= Watergate (TV series) =

- Genre: Documentary
- Based on: Watergate: The Corruption and Fall of Richard Nixon by Fred Emery
- Directed by: Mick Gold
- Narrated by: Fred Emery
- Composer: Tim Souster
- Country of origin: United Kingdom
- Original language: English
- No. of series: 1
- No. of episodes: 5

Production
- Producers: Norma Percy; Paul Mitchell
- Production company: Brian Lapping Productions for BBC

Original release
- Network: BBC2 (UK); Discovery (USA)
- Release: 8 May – 5 June 1994

Watergate is a documentary series co-produced by the BBC and Discovery, broadcast in 1994. It was based on the book Watergate: The Corruption and Fall of Richard Nixon, by Fred Emery. The series was directed by Mick Gold and produced by Paul Mitchell and Norma Percy.

The British version was broadcast on BBC2 from 8 May to 5 June 1994, and narrated by Fred Emery. It was broadcast as five episodes of 50 minutes each. In the United States, the series premiered on August 7, 1994, and was narrated by Daniel Schorr in three parts, with two episodes shown back-to-back for the first two parts and reruns on September 17, 1995.

== Episodes ==
Britain:

1. Break-in (8 May 1994)
2. Cover-up (15 May 1994)
3. Scapegoat (22 May 1994)
4. Massacre (29 May 1994)
5. Impeachment (5 June 1994)

USA:

1. A Third Rate Burglary (7 August 1994)
2. The Conspiracy Crumbles (14 August 1994)
3. The Fall of a President (21 August 1994)

== Production ==
Norma Percy and Brian Lapping pioneered a documentary style of investigating recent international events which involved interviewing senior participants from presidents downwards and succinct editing to juxtapose their eye-witness accounts. Early successes include Breakthrough at Reykjavik in 1987 and The Death of Yugoslavia in 1995. Watergate featured exclusive interviews with many of the key participants in the events, including H. R. Haldeman, John Ehrlichman, John Dean and G. Gordon Liddy as well as former President Gerald Ford.

Percy and Lapping had initially been intrigued by a conspiracy theory, propounded in the book Silent Coup by Len Colodny and Robert Gettlin, that it had been John Dean who organised both the break-in and the cover-up, not the Committee for the Re-Election of the President. However, their research only underlined that the truth had already been uncovered by the Ervin Committee and special prosecutor Leon Jaworski. Percy explained in a The New York Times interview in May 1994: "The guilty party wasn't one wayward aide. It was the President of the United States in the White House Oval Office who did it."

Among the frankest of the conspirators interviewed, an unrepentant Liddy had served the longest sentence in jail and so talked explicitly about his role. He was filmed at home while sitting in front of his sizeable collection of firearms, describing "how he had been ready, if ordered, to go straight out and kill Jack Anderson, the Washington D.C. columnist." At one point he was filmed wielding one of his pistols before the TV camera. It was made clear that, at the time of filming, the gun collection was registered in his wife's name, since he was ineligible for a license.

Following Liddy's death in 2021, BBC4 started repeating the series on 14 April in the UK.

== Reception ==
Reviewing the series, Jeff Silverman wrote in Variety: "Twenty years after Richard Nixon resigned the presidency in disgrace, this stunningly conceived and realized documentary miniseries brilliantly chronicles the events — and their inevitability — that led to the national nightmare Watergate. Funny, tragic, pathetic and probing, docu dramatically stares down Watergate’s smoking gun and makes its ultimate conclusion perfectly clear: Nixon’s the one. Still. Now more than ever."

== Awards ==
Watergate won a 1995 News & Documentary Emmy Award for Outstanding Historical Programming.
