= Allan Little =

British journalist

James Allan Stuart Little (born 11 October 1959) is a Special Correspondent for BBC News, based at New Broadcasting House, London.

== Early life ==
Little was born on 11 October 1959 in Dunragit, a small village in Dumfries and Galloway, Scotland. He attended Stranraer Academy before attending and graduating from the University of Edinburgh, where he read history and politics.

== Career ==
In 1983, Little joined BBC Scotland to work as a news and current affairs researcher, and in 1985 transferred to London in order to train as a radio reporter. After two years at BBC Radio Solent, Little moved to BBC Radio 4's Today programme in 1988. Here, he specialised in foreign reporting, including the Revolutions of 1989 in Eastern Europe.

Between 1990 and 1995, Little worked as a BBC News reporter, during this period reported from Baghdad during the 1991 Gulf War and from Kuwait following the war, covering the Shia rebellions. From 1991 to 1995, he reported on the break-up of Yugoslavia. He co-wrote (with Laura Silber) the book The Death of Yugoslavia, which accompanied the television series of the same name, produced by Norma Percy at Brook Lapping. In 1995, Little moved to Johannesburg as the BBC's South Africa correspondent. While based in Johannesburg, he reported on the aftermath of the Rwandan genocide and the overthrow of Zaire's President Mobutu. Between 1997 and 1999, he served as the BBC's Moscow correspondent during Boris Yeltsin's tenure as Russian president.

In early 1999, Little began work on a number of current affairs projects and to present the Today programme on BBC Radio 4. He worked as the BBC's Africa correspondent from 2000 to 2001. He was then sent to be the BBC's correspondent in Paris, where he remained until 2005. Little's final role at the BBC was as a special correspondent. In this role, he reported on devolution and led the BBC's coverage of the Scottish independence referendum. The BBC announced in December 2014 that he would be leaving the broadcaster at the end of 2014. Little stated: "I am leaving the staff of the BBC to pursue other projects and hope to continue working in broadcasting in the future".

In June 2015, it was announced that he would succeed Susan Rice as the chair of the Edinburgh International Book Festival in October 2015. He has continued to work as a freelance journalist, and in September 2022 led commentary from Westminster Abbey of the funeral of Queen Elizabeth II for BBC Radio.

== Awards ==
Little has won several awards including a Gold Sony Radio Award for Reporter of the Year in 1992, Amnesty International Reporter of the Year in 1992, Bayeux-Calvados Radio War Correspondent of the Year in 1994, a Sony Documentary Gold Award in 2000, and the Grierson Premier TV Documentary Award in 2001. In 2008 Little won the UACES/Thomson Reuters Reporting Europe prize. In 2012 he was the fourth recipient of the Charles Wheeler Award for Outstanding Contribution to Broadcast Journalism.
