= Operation Sandwedge =

1971 proposed American intelligence-gathering operation

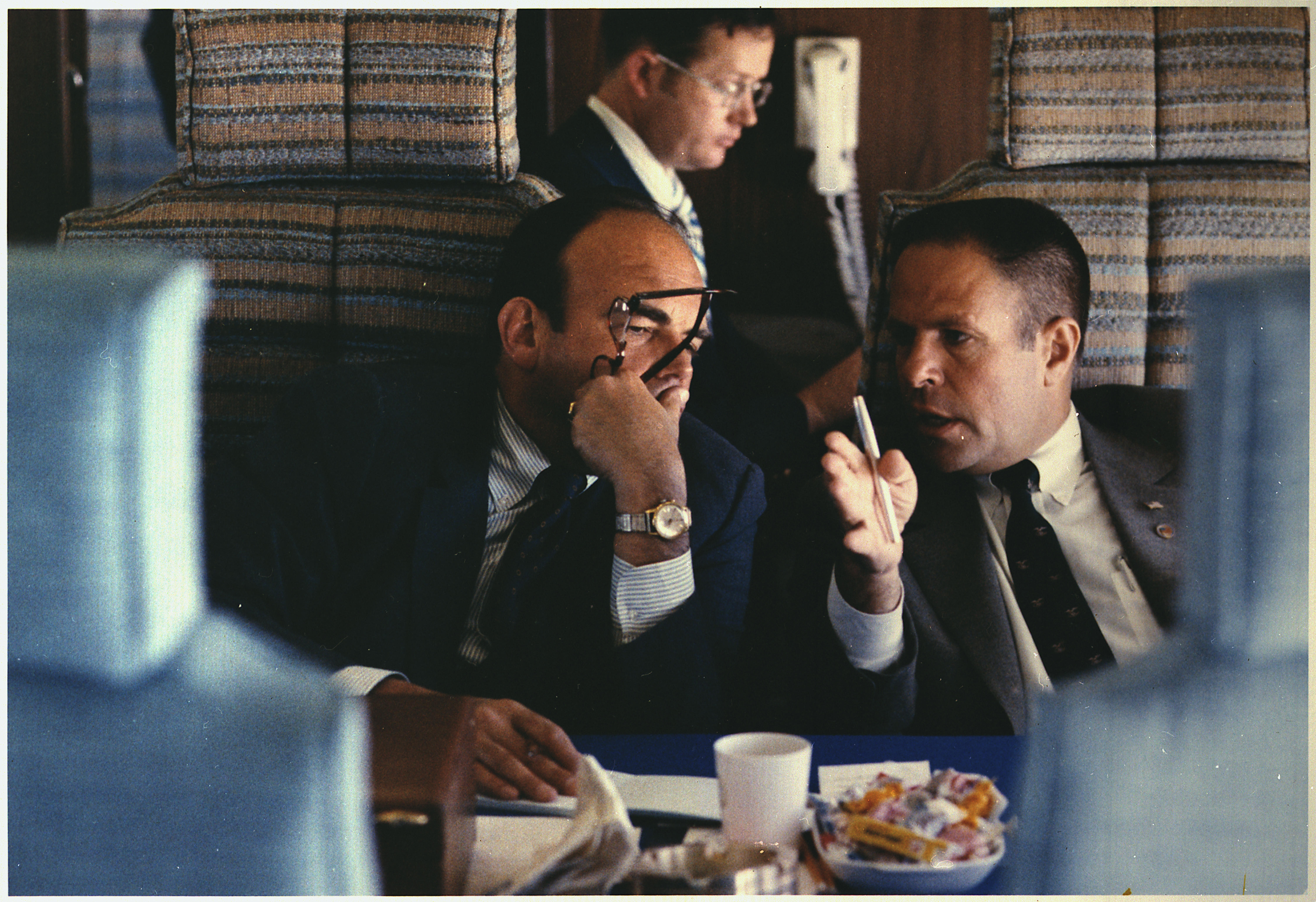
- John Ehrlichman and H. R. Haldeman in 1973
- Type: Black bag operation
- Motive: Richard Nixon's 1972 re-election
- Target: Democratic political enemies; Anti-Vietnam War movement
- Outcome: Succeeded by Operation Gemstone

Operation Sandwedge was a proposed clandestine intelligence-gathering operation against the political enemies of U.S. President Richard Nixon's administration. The proposals were put together by Nixon's Chief of Staff H. R. Haldeman, domestic affairs assistant John Ehrlichman and staffer Jack Caulfield in 1971. Caulfield, a former police officer, created a plan to target the Democratic Party and the anti-Vietnam War movement, inspired by what he believed to be the Democratic Party's employment of a private investigation firm.

The operation was planned to help Nixon's 1972 re-election campaign. Operation Sandwedge included proposed surveillance of Nixon's enemies to gather information on their financial status and sexual activities, to be carried out through illegal black bag operations. The operation would have targeted not only the anti-Vietnam war movement and the political opposition, but rivals within Nixon's own Republican Party as well.

Control of Sandwedge was passed to G. Gordon Liddy, who abandoned it in favor of a strategy of his own devising, Operation Gemstone, which detailed a plan to break into Democratic Party offices in the Watergate complex. Liddy's plan eventually led to the downfall of Nixon's presidency, which Caulfield believed would have been avoided had Sandwedge been acted upon.

== Background ==
In 1968, Richard Nixon, the Republican Party nominee, won the presidential election, defeating Democrat Hubert Humphrey, the incumbent Vice President. Nixon's margin of victory in the popular vote was seven-tenths of a percent. Nixon had previously contested the 1960 election, narrowly losing to Democrat John F. Kennedy by a margin of less than 118,000 votes, which amounted to less than two-tenths of a percent of the total. The close margins involved in these elections—in particular, a swing of 28,000 votes in Texas or 4,500 in Illinois would have changed the outcomes in those states—have been cited by historian Theodore H. White as the impetus for future Nixon campaigns valuing every potential vote and not merely seeking a majority. White also makes the claim that electoral fraud was widespread within both main parties of the 1960 election. Nixon appointed H. R. Haldeman as his Chief of Staff; a position which granted Haldeman a relatively large degree of control over the activities of the presidential administration. Haldeman had first worked for Nixon in 1956, when Nixon was running as Dwight D. Eisenhower's vice-presidential candidate in the 1952 election.

By 1971, Nixon's staff were receiving a cursory intelligence report from Haldeman's assistant, Gordon C. Strachan; Strachan's reports essentially collated information about political rallies and campaign groups that had already been gathered by the police and the Federal Bureau of Investigation. Nixon's initial re-election bid had already involved planting rumors and false information about his opponents as a dedicated strategy; these tactics had been dubbed "political hardball" by Nixon's opposition researcher, Pat Buchanan. In August 1971, Strachan had convinced Jeb Stuart Magruder, a member of the Committee for the Re-Election of the President (CRP)—the campaign group for Nixon's re-election bid—to infiltrate the office of Edmund Muskie. Muskie was a Democratic senator who had been Humphrey's 1968 vice-presidential candidate, and was a front-runner for his party's presidential bid for the 1972 campaign.

== Inception ==
In late 1971, John Dean, the White House Counsel, pushed to expand the existing intelligence program ahead of the 1972 re-election campaign. Dean delegated the task to Jack Caulfield, a member of his staff who was a former New York police officer. According to Dean, Caulfield himself was interested in work outside of politics; he intended to create a private security company, and felt that if the Nixon cabinet were an early client, it would lead to lucrative future clients within the private sector. Caulfield reportedly requested $511,000 (equivalent to $4,062,387 in 2025) from the campaign to establish field offices in Washington, New York, and Chicago. Fred Emery, a journalist for The Times and BBC, disputes this, claiming in his book Watergate: The Corruption & Fall of Richard Nixon that the idea of a private sector security firm was simply a front for a committed campaign of surveillance working for Nixon and the Republican Party, with political donations to the re-election campaign able to be diverted through the company as though they were unrelated transactions.

John Ehrlichman, who was a long-time friend of Haldeman and had also served as White House Counsel, had been part of the operation's inception; by 1971 he was Nixon's domestic affairs assistant. Ehrlichman had initially hired Caulfield in 1969. Ehrlichman intended that Caulfield should conduct private investigations while undercover as a private sector employee; it was Caulfield who insisted on working from the White House. Caulfield's work to this end had already resulted in two wiretaps on phone lines—one on Nixon's brother Donald, and another on journalist Joseph Kraft.

Caulfield prepared a twelve-page draft proposal detailing an intelligence-gathering strategy, aimed at the opposition Democratic Party; he worked on this draft for several months and presented it to Nixon's staff in September 1971. The proposal, dubbed "Operation Sandwedge", (Note: John Dean attributes the name to Caulfield's enthusiasm for golf, noting that a sand wedge club is used to recover a ball from precarious ground.) called for a budget of $500,000 (equivalent to $3,974,938 in 2025), primarily to cover private investigative work and security for the Republican National Convention, although Caulfield intimated privately that it would also include electronic surveillance.

== Planned activities ==
The operation's investigations and surveillance would, in part, assess how the anti-Vietnam War movement could damage Nixon's campaign. Nixon's staff also anticipated that the Democratic campaign would employ the services of Intertel, a private investigation firm led by former Department of Justice officials who had served under Robert F. Kennedy, a Democrat and former Attorney General who had been the leading Democratic candidate in the 1968 primaries before his assassination. Caulfield noted that this firm had the potential to employ "formidable and sophisticated" intelligence-gathering techniques, and Sandwedge was his attempt to create a Republican counterpart. The plan would involve black bag operations, targeting political enemies of the campaign. Electronic surveillance was also an element of the proposal, with plans to scrutinize the private lives of the targets, including their tax records and sexual habits. The Sandwedge proposal also included a list of people willing to work with Caulfield on the project, among them several investigators and officials of the Internal Revenue Service and a former sheriff of Cook County, Illinois.

Herb Kalmbach, Nixon's own attorney, transferred $50,000 (equivalent to $397,494 in 2025) to Caulfield at the request of John N. Mitchell. Mitchell had served as Attorney General during Nixon's first term, and directed the 1972 re-election campaign. Caulfield was also given responsibility for the salary of Tony Ulasewicz, an operative he planned to use for Sandwedge activities. Strachan, Dean and other staff members were frustrated at the pace of Caulfield's development of the project. Strachan directly questioned whether Caulfield was capable of fulfilling the role in a memo dated from October 1971, while Haldeman, wishing for a project on a larger scale, pressed Mitchell for a budget of $800,000 (equivalent to $6,359,901 in 2025) for surveillance and "miscellaneous" activities.

Caulfield recruited James W. McCord, Jr., a retired CIA officer, to protect the offices of the Republican National Convention and the CRP from electronic bugging. CRP directly employed McCord from January 1972. Caulfield also sent Ulasewicz to the campaign offices of Paul McCloskey in New Hampshire. McCloskey was a Republican congressman from California who was running for the party's presidential nomination against Nixon on a platform opposing the Vietnam War. He was not regarded as a credible threat to Nixon's campaign, but had made statements calling for Nixon to be impeached. In December 1971, Ulasewicz masqueraded as a journalist to interview McCloskey's staff, Caulfield dubbing the effort a "Sandwedge-engineered penetration".

== Cancellation ==
In October 1971, Haldeman, Mitchell, Magruder and Strachan met to discuss the Sandwedge project. As a result of this meeting, control of the operation was passed to G. Gordon Liddy, because Mitchell wanted a lawyer in charge of the campaign's intelligence-gathering. Another factor in Caulfield's removal was the belief of several White House officials—including Dean—that Caulfield's Irish-American, non-college-educated background was at odds with "an Administration of WASP professional men".

Liddy built upon the proposals to devise "Operation Gemstone", a more expansive plan of espionage. Gemstone was an umbrella term for several discrete operations, each of which expanded upon elements of the Sandwedge draft or existing CRP activities. Operation Diamond covered breaking up protest demonstrations, Ruby involved undercover infiltration and honeypot traps, Crystal concerned electronic surveillance and wiretaps, and Sapphire proposed the sabotage of rival political campaigns. Campaign officials deemed Liddy's initial draft of Operation Gemstone "too extreme", but a scaled-down version was later approved in 1972. Despite Liddy's restructuring of the project, Dean requested additional funding for the original Sandwedge proposal in January 1972, although Mitchell's rejection of this request signaled the project's end.

Liddy's revised Gemstone plan included a range of illegal activities, including a proposal to break into Democratic Party offices in the Watergate complex. The Watergate burglaries were initially assumed to have been part of Operation Sandwedge, and the investigation into both the burglaries and the project led to Caulfield's resignation from his position as assistant director of criminal enforcement at the Bureau of Alcohol, Tobacco and Firearms.

== Aftermath ==
In the course of the Watergate scandal, 69 people were tried for various crimes. Of those tried, 48 pled guilty. Among those found guilty for covering up the affair were Haldeman, Ehrlichmann, Mitchell, Dean and Magruder; Liddy was found guilty for his role in the break-ins. All 48 men served time in prison as a result of their convictions. Faced with impeachment in the aftermath, Nixon resigned the presidency on August 8, 1974. He remains the only president to have resigned the office.

Caulfield has suggested that Sandwedge's cancellation by the administration was an error in judgment, possibly "the most monumental of the Nixon Presidency". He believed that, had Sandwedge been adopted as the campaign's strategy, "there would have been no Liddy, no Hunt, no McCord", and the subsequent Watergate scandal would not have occurred. Speaking of the initial proposal, Dean defended its merits, stating that "Caulfield, not the plan itself, had killed Sandwedge".

== See also ==
- Huston Plan
- White House Plumbers
