= Putin, Russia and the West =

- Genre: Politics
- Country of origin: United Kingdom
- No. of episodes: 4

Production
- Producer: Norma Percy
- Running time: 60 minutes
- Production company: BBC

Original release
- Network: BBC Two
- Release: 19 January – 9 February 2012

Putin, Russia and the West is a four-part British documentary television series first shown in January and February 2012 on BBC Two about the relationship between Russia, under Vladimir Putin, and the West.

The series is produced by Norma Percy, whose previous series include The Death of Yugoslavia, Israel and the Arabs: Elusive Peace, and Iran and the West.

== Episodes ==
No.	Title	Original release date
1	"Taking Control"	19 January 2012
Newly elected President of the United States George W. Bush famously declared in June 2001 that he had looked Putin in the eye and 'got a sense of his soul'. It is revealed that on the same occasion, Putin had given Bush a prophetic warning about Pakistan, Afghanistan and the Taliban. Contributors include: Condoleezza Rice, Sergei Ivanov and Gerhard Schröder. This episode looks at Putin's relationship with Russia's oligarchs, particularly vis-a-vis Russia's oil supplies, ultimately leading to the arrest of Mikhail Khodorkovsky.
2	"Democracy Threatens"	26 January 2012
This episode focusses on the 2004 Ukrainian presidential election, the subsequent Orange Revolution, and Russia's involvement in it.
3	"War"	2 February 2012
In August 2008, the Russia–Georgia war broke out. This episode discusses the political implications of this conflict for Russia's relationship with the West.
4	"New Start"	9 February 2012
After Barack Obama was elected President of the United States in November 2008, Russian President Dmitri Medvedev attempted to improve Russia–United States relations.

== Reception and reaction ==
The series won a Peabody Award in 2012 because it "exposes and explains history as process, as something made with choices rather than something to be recalled and described."

=== United Kingdom ===
While noting that Norma Percy managed to get Putin's insiders like Mikhail Kasyanov to tell his story, The Guardian's David Hearst, points out she failed to obtain participation of individuals from Putin's inner circle such as Igor Sechin and Vladislav Surkov, the so-called siloviki. Still, Hearst concludes: "For all the trials and tribulations that Percy faced in getting close to her man, the series remains compulsive viewing for all those who want to know what went on inside Russia for the last decade".

After watching its first episode, the UK-based Soviet dissident Vladimir Bukovsky labelled the documentary "unequivocally pro-Putin". Writing on his blog on the Moscow radio station Ekho Moskvy website, Bukovsky went on to criticise the documentary as "nothing less than a party political broadcast for Putin and his United Russia party" and "an utter apology for Putin and his regime" before concluding that "if Putin had asked his propagandists to come up with a film they couldn't have done better". Bukovsky also talked of being mystified why BBC licence payers' money was spent on the film, and called for a UK parliamentary inquiry. Furthermore, Bukovsky addressed former Tony Blair's chief-of-staff Jonathan Powell admitting in the BBC documentary that the 'spy rock' found in a Moscow park had indeed been used by British intelligence officers and the subsequent inclusion of the admission in a documentary by Russian journalist Arkady Mamontov as follows: "I don't have any doubt that this is an FSB operation. They deftly used the BBC film to resurrect old propaganda just when mass demonstrations are going on in Moscow before the presidential election".

=== Russia ===
Much of the reaction to Putin, Russia and the West documentary in Russia concerned the new revelations by Jonathan Powell about the 'spy rock' episode from 2006.

Andrei Illarionov, Putin's economic adviser turned political opponent, wrote on his LiveJournal blog: "This whole story is like a game in which the public only knows part of the information. And it looks like a game with players other than the Russian authorities".

Journalist and popular blogger Anton Nosik went further on his LiveJournal blog, accusing the filmmakers of taking Russian state money through the PR agency Ketchum Inc., which has a contract to "improve the image of Russia in the West".

Writing in The Moscow Times, the Sanoma-owned English language freesheet published in Moscow, Victor Davidoff has problems with the filmmakers' general political stance when it comes to Putin's Russia, which he feels follows the dominant theory among the leftist Westerners, that of "Putin's anti-democratic crusade largely being a legitimate reaction to the hostile policies of the West, especially the United States". Davidoff feels the documentary "bought into the Kremlin version of history: Putin came to power, put an end to the 'chaos of the 1990s,' took the country back from the oligarchs and gave Russians prosperity". Davidoff continues by comparing the current Western leftist support for Putin with their past support of Fidel Castro and Saddam Hussein: "You don't need conspiracy theories to explain this particular version of events. In the democratic West, there have always been people who have defended dictators, from Fidel Castro to Saddam Hussein. They didn't get paid from foreign bank accounts. They were simply left wing and anti-American".

== See also ==
- Georgia–Russia relations
- Russia–Ukraine relations
- Russia–United States relations
- Russia–United Kingdom relations
