= End of empire =

End of empire is a phrase that may refer to:

- The final phase in the decline of an imperial power, such as the British or Byzantine empires.
- Decolonization
- Abolition of monarchy
- List of extinct states
- Empire's End, a book from the fictional Star Wars franchise
- End of Empire, 14 part 1985 Granada Television series written and produced by Brian Lapping and Norma Percy
- The End of the Empire, a 1983 science fiction novel by Alexis Gilliland
