= G. Gordon Liddy =

American FBI agent, lawyer and Watergate criminal (1930–2021)

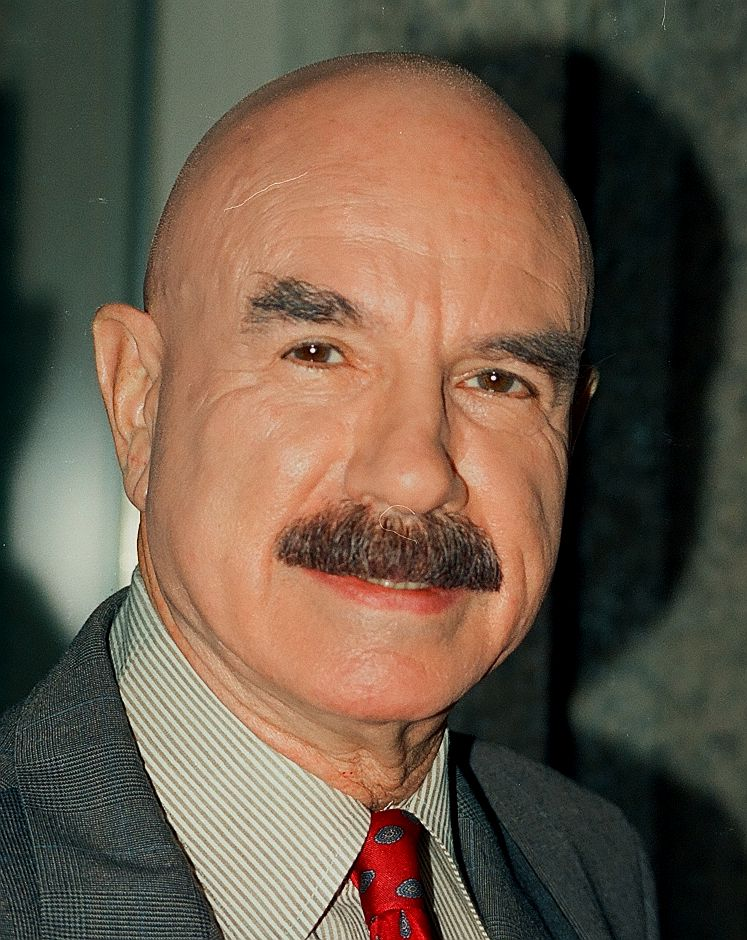
- Liddy c. 1998
- Born: George Gordon Battle Liddy; November 30, 1930; New York City, U.S.
- Died: March 30, 2021 (aged 90); Mount Vernon, Virginia, U.S.
- Education: Fordham University (BA, LLB)
- Political party: Republican
- Spouse: Frances Purcell (m. 1957; died 2010)
- Children: 5; including Tom
- Criminal information
- Criminal charges: Conspiracy, burglary, illegal wiretapping
- Penalty: 20 years imprisonment; commuted to 8 years imprisonment by President Jimmy Carter
- Military career
- Allegiance: United States
- Branch: United States Army
- Service years: 1952–1954
- Rank: First Lieutenant

George Gordon Battle Liddy (November 30, 1930 – March 30, 2021) was an American lawyer and FBI agent who was convicted of conspiracy, burglary, and illegal wiretapping for his role in the Watergate scandal during the Nixon administration.

Working alongside E. Howard Hunt, Liddy organized and directed the burglary of the Democratic National Committee headquarters in the Watergate building in May and June 1972. After five of Liddy's operatives were arrested inside the DNC offices on June 17, 1972, subsequent investigations of the Watergate scandal led to Nixon's resignation in 1974. Liddy was convicted of burglary, conspiracy, and refusing to testify to the Senate committee investigating Watergate. He served nearly 52 months in federal prisons.

Liddy later joined with Timothy Leary for a series of debates on multiple college campuses, and similarly worked with Al Franken in the late 1990s. Liddy served as a radio talk show host from 1992 until his retirement on July 27, 2012. His radio show was syndicated in 160 markets by Radio America and on both Sirius Satellite Radio and XM Satellite Radio stations in the United States. He was a guest panelist for Fox News Channel in addition to appearing in a cameo role or as a guest celebrity talent on several television shows.

== Early life, family, education, military service ==
Liddy was born in Brooklyn, New York City, New York, on November 30, 1930. His father Sylvester James Liddy was a lawyer and mother was Maria (Abbaticchio) Liddy. His family was of Irish and Italian descent, and Liddy had a strict Catholic upbringing, stating that "the most frightening menace of all" was God. He was named for George Gordon Battle, a noted attorney and Tammany Hall leader.

He was raised in Hoboken and West Caldwell, New Jersey. Because Hoboken had a significant German immigrant population particularly in the 1930s, and the majority of them had enthusiastically positive views of Adolf Hitler at that time; he grew up sharing the same positive views of him, even going so far as to have fond memories of Hitler that his German immigrant nanny that his parents hired to look after him when he was a child had. He attended St. Benedict's Preparatory School, his father's alma mater, in Newark.

Liddy was educated at Fordham University, graduating in 1952. While at Fordham he was a member of the National Society of Pershing Rifles.

Following graduation, Liddy joined the US Army, serving for two years as an artillery officer during the Korean War era. Although he attained the rank of first lieutenant, he was not deployed overseas, having been assigned to an antiaircraft radar unit in Brooklyn for medical reasons.

In 1954, he was admitted to the Fordham University School of Law, earning a position on the Fordham Law Review. He graduated in 1957.

== Career ==
=== FBI ===
After graduation from law school, Liddy worked at the Federal Bureau of Investigation (FBI) under J. Edgar Hoover in 1957. Liddy was initially a field agent in Indiana and Denver, Colorado. While stationed in Denver, he made a significant arrest on September 10, 1960: Ernest Tait, a notable criminal who had twice appeared on the Ten Most Wanted.

At age 29, Liddy became the youngest bureau supervisor at FBI headquarters in Washington, D.C. Under the mentorship of deputy director Cartha DeLoach, Liddy secured a position on director J. Edgar Hoover's personal staff, even acting as Hoover's ghostwriter. Despite his achievements, Liddy was also known for his reckless behavior among his fellow agents, highlighted by two particular incidents.

The first incident took place in Kansas City, Missouri, during a covert operation. He was arrested but was subsequently released after contacting Clarence M. Kelley, former FBI agent and the then-chief of the Kansas City Police. The second incident involved an FBI background check that Liddy conducted on his future wife before they married in 1957. Liddy later claimed this action was a routine precautionary measure.

Prior to his departure from the FBI in 1962, Liddy sought admission to various bars, leveraging his professional contacts. His application for admission to the United States Supreme Court was supported by Solicitor General Archibald Cox.

=== Prosecutor and politician ===
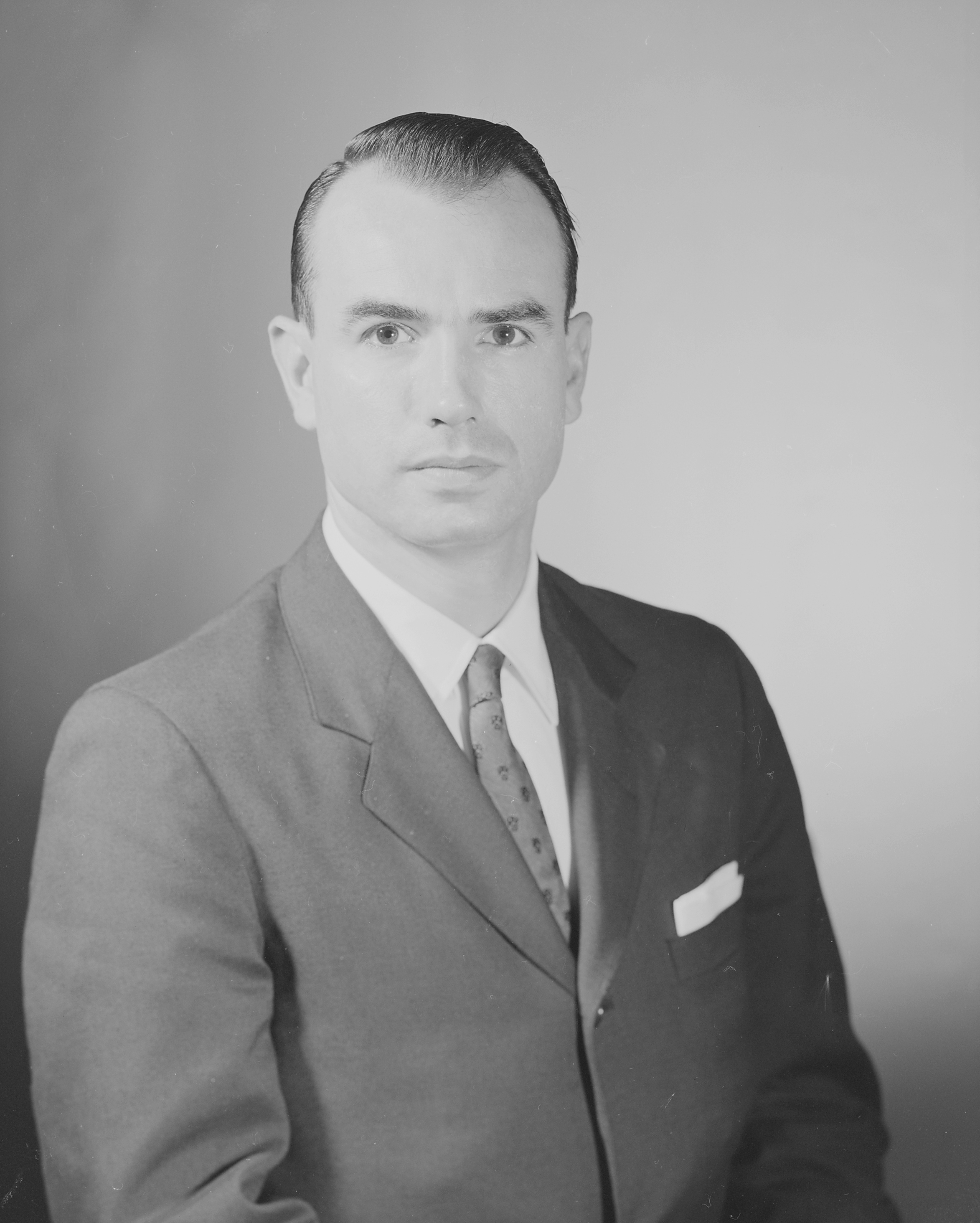
Liddy circa 1964

Liddy resigned from the FBI in 1962 and worked under his father as a patent attorney in New York City until 1966. He was then hired by District Attorney Raymond Baratta as a prosecutor in exurban Dutchess County, New York, after providing references from the FBI. In 1966, he led a drug raid on the Hitchcock Estate (then occupied by Timothy Leary) in Millbrook, New York, leading to an unsuccessful trial. Although the case generated much publicity, other lawyers complained that Liddy received credit for something in which he played a relatively small role. He was also reprimanded for firing a revolver at the ceiling in a courtroom. In 1969, a drug raid directed by Liddy at Bard College scooped up, among others, Donald Fagen and Walter Becker, who later formed the band Steely Dan and wrote the song "My Old School" about the raid. Liddy is referred to in the lyrics as "Daddy Gee".

During that period, Liddy ran unsuccessfully for the post of District Attorney. In 1968, he continued to seek office by running in the Republican Party's primary election for New York's 28th congressional district. Employing the slogan "Gordon Liddy doesn't bail them out; he puts them in", he lost to Hamilton Fish IV in a close race. Liddy then accepted the nomination of the Conservative Party of New York State and ran in the general election against Fish and the Democratic candidate, Millbrook businessman John S. Dyson. Fearing that Liddy might tip the election to Dyson, Fish turned to the district's Republican leader, State Assemblyman Kenneth L. Wilson, to get Liddy out of the race. Wilson's office dispatched the matter to the Republican Congressional Campaign Committee in Washington, resulting in Liddy being offered a potential Richard Nixon administration political appointment at the United States Department of the Treasury; this prompted him to officially suspend his campaign.

After serving as county director of Nixon's successful presidential campaign, he began the aforementioned political role as a special assistant for narcotics and gun control at the Treasury Department's Washington, D.C. headquarters in early 1969. Shortly thereafter, he helped to establish the country's contemporary sky marshal program under the aegis of the United States Marshals Service.

Beginning in 1970, he served with Gordon Strachan and David Young as an aide to Domestic Affairs Advisor John D. Ehrlichman in the Executive Office of the President at the behest of Egil "Bud" Krogh, who had worked on initiatives with Liddy at the Treasury Department. He served as the nominal general counsel to the finance committee of the Committee to Re-elect the President (CRP) from 1971 to 1972. Subsequently, Krogh, Liddy, Young, and Erlichman were indicted for conspiracy to commit burglary in September 1973.

== White House undercover operative ==
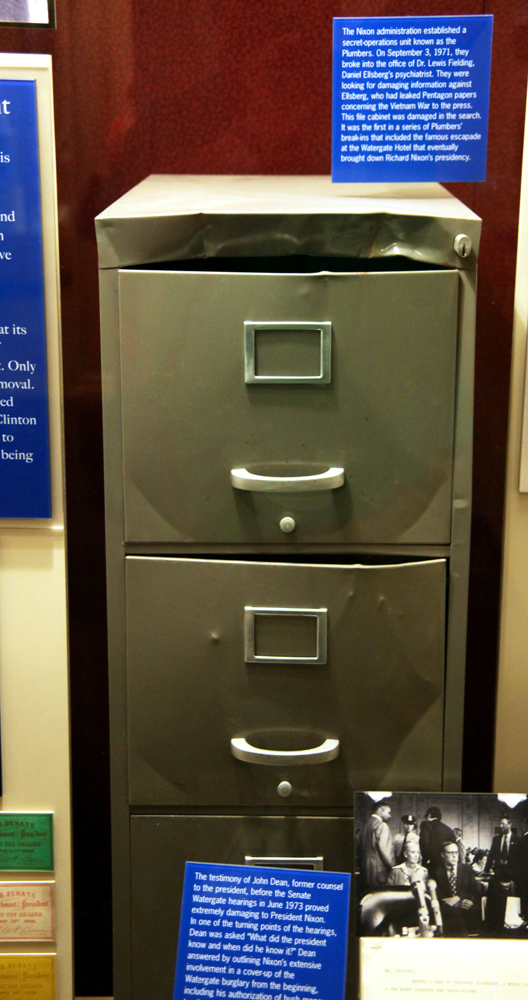
Dr. Lewis Fielding's filing cabinet. He was the psychiatrist to the Nixon administration's "enemy" Daniel Ellsberg who leaked the Pentagon Papers, broken into by Liddy and others in 1971, on display in the Smithsonian National Museum of American History

After serving in several mid-level law enforcement and domestic policy roles in the Nixon administration, Liddy was moved to Nixon's 1972 re-election campaign in 1971 order to extend the scope and reach of the White House Plumbers "special investigations unit", which had been created in response to damaging leaks of information to the press. Liddy's own name for the group was ODESSA, a reference to escape plans made by the Nazis.

At CRP, Liddy concocted several plots in early 1972, collectively known under the title "Operation Gemstone". Some of these were far-fetched, intended to embarrass the Democratic opposition. These included kidnapping anti-war protest organizers and transporting them to Mexico during the Republican National Convention (which at the time was planned for San Diego), as well as luring mid-level Democratic campaign officials to a house boat in Miami, where they would be secretly photographed in compromising positions with prostitutes. Most of Liddy's ideas were rejected by Attorney General John N. Mitchell (who became campaign manager in March 1972), but a few were approved by Nixon administration officials, including the 1971 break-in at Daniel Ellsberg's psychiatrist's office in Los Angeles. Ellsberg had leaked the Pentagon Papers to The New York Times. At some point, Liddy was instructed to break into the Democratic National Committee offices in the Watergate Complex.

=== Watergate burglaries ===
Liddy was the Nixon administration liaison and leader of the group of five men who broke into the headquarters of the Democratic National Committee at the Watergate Complex. At least two separate entries were made in May and June 1972; the burglars were apprehended on June 17. The purposes of the break-in were never conclusively established. The burglars sought to place wiretaps and planned to photograph documents. Their first attempt had led to improperly-functioning recording devices being installed. Liddy and Hunt masterminded the break-in from the Watergate Hotel Room 214, where they could look right into the DNC office, but Liddy claimed he did not actually enter the Watergate Complex at the time of the burglaries; rather, he admitted to supervising the second break-in which he coordinated with E. Howard Hunt, from room 723 in the adjacent Howard Johnson Hotel. Liddy was convicted of conspiracy, burglary, and illegal wiretapping.

Liddy was sentenced to a 20-year prison term and was ordered to pay $40,000 in fines. He began serving the sentence on January 30, 1973. He claimed that on arrival he sang the Horst Wessel Song, the Nazi Party anthem. On April 12, 1977, President Jimmy Carter commuted Liddy's sentence to eight years, "in the interest of equity and fairness based on a comparison of Mr. Liddy's sentence with those of all others convicted in Watergate related prosecutions", leaving the fine in effect. Carter's commutation made Liddy eligible for parole as of July 9, 1977. Liddy was released on September 7, 1977, after serving a total of four and a half years of incarceration.

Liddy was charged with two counts of contempt of Congress in March 1974, on the same day that he and the three Cuban burglars were charged with the Watergate-related crimes. Following a bench trial on May 10, 1974, Liddy was convicted of contempt for his refusal to answer questions of the Special Subcommittee of Intelligence of the House Armed Services Committee, which was investigating the CIA's links to the break-in of the offices of Dr. Lewis Fielding, the psychiatrist to Daniel Ellsberg. Liddy was found guilty and was handed a suspended jail sentence and probation; the judge stated that the sentence was lenient because Liddy was already sentenced to prison on the Watergate charges. Liddy became one of very few people in American history to be convicted of criminal contempt of Congress.

== After prison ==
In 1980, Liddy published an autobiography, Will, which sold more than a million copies and was made into a television film. In it, he states that he was willing to kill during the Ellsberg break-in, and that he once made plans with Hunt to kill journalist Jack Anderson, based on a literal interpretation of a Nixon White House statement, "we need to get rid of this Anderson guy". His plan to put a single pill of poison in Anderson's bottle of painkillers - nicknamed "aspirin roulette"- was rejected, criticized for being too slow of a method and endangering other members of the Anderson family.

In the early 1980s, Liddy joined forces with former Niles, Illinois, policeman and co-owner of the Protection Group, Ltd., Thomas E. Ferraro Jr., to launch a private security and countersurveillance firm called G. Gordon Liddy & Associates.

Liddy emerged to host his own talk radio show in 1992. Less than a year later, its popularity led to national syndication through Viacom's Westwood One Network, and through Radio America in 2003. His radio show was syndicated in 160 markets, and was on both Sirius Satellite Radio and XM Satellite Radio stations in the United States. Liddy's show ended on July 27, 2012. He was also an occasional guest panelist for the Fox News Channel.

In 1994 and 1995, Liddy repeatedly told listeners of his radio program to shoot federal law enforcement officers, giving instructions to aim for their heads. In many of these statements, he referenced shooting in self-defense. After the Oklahoma City bombing, when President Clinton denounced the "many loud and angry voices" in conservative talk radio, Liddy responded that the head is a difficult target to hit and that he used pictures of the President and Hillary Clinton for target practice.

Liddy was sued for defamation in 1999 by Ida "Maxie" Wells, a secretary whose desk at the Democratic National Committee Headquarters at the Watergate was said to have been a target of the last Watergate break-in in order to find evidence related to an alleged prostitution ring kept in Wells's desk. Wells's suit accused Liddy of defamation. Liddy denied the allegation, and the judge dismissed the suit, commenting that "no 'reasonable jury' could have found in favor of the plaintiff."

In addition to Will, he wrote the nonfiction books When I Was a Kid, This Was a Free Country (2002) and Fight Back! Tackling Terrorism, Liddy Style (2006, with his son, Cdr. James G. Liddy, along with J. Michael Barrett and Joel Selanikio). He also published two novels: Out of Control (1979) and The Monkey Handlers (1990). Liddy was one of many people interviewed for the biography of Abbie Hoffman, Steal this Dream, by Larry "Ratso" Sloman.

== Lectures, acting career and documentaries ==
In the mid-1980s Liddy went on the lecture circuit, being listed as the top speaker on the college circuit in 1982 by The Wall Street Journal. He later joined onetime foil Timothy Leary in a series of debates billed as "Nice Scary Guy vs. Scary Nice Guy" on the college circuit as well; Leary had once been labeled by Liddy's ex-employer Richard Nixon as "the most dangerous man in America". The lectures were the subject of a 1983 documentary film, Return Engagement.

Liddy discussing how the Watergate burglars were caught

In 1994, the British documentary company Brian Lapping Associates sent producers Norma Percy and Paul Mitchell to interview many of the conspirators for its series titled Watergate, in which an unrepentant Liddy talked frankly about his role. He was filmed at home while sitting in front of his sizable collection of firearms and describing "how he had been ready, if ordered, to go straight out and kill Jack Anderson, the Washington D.C. columnist." At one point he was filmed wielding one of his pistols before the TV camera. It was made clear that, at the time of filming, the gun collection was registered in his wife's name, as he was ineligible for a license.

Liddy acted in several films, including Street Asylum, Feds, Adventures in Spying, Camp Cucamonga, and Rules of Engagement. He appeared on such television shows as The Highwayman, Airwolf, Fear Factor, Perry Mason, and MacGyver. He had recurring roles in Miami Vice and Super Force, and guest starred in Al Franken's LateLine. On April 7, 1986, he appeared at WrestleMania II as a guest judge for a boxing match between Mr. T (with Joe Frazier and The Haiti Kid) versus Roddy Piper (with Bob Orton and Lou Duva). In April 1987 he appeared as a celebrity partner for a week on the game show Super Password, playing against Betty White.

Liddy appeared in the 1993 Golden Book Video release of Encyclopedia Brown: The Case of the Burgled Baseball Cards as Corky Lodato. In Miami Vice, he acted with John Diehl, who would later go on to portray Liddy himself in Oliver Stone's movie Nixon (1995). During his two guest appearances in Miami Vice, Liddy played William "Captain Real Estate" Maynard, a shadowy former covert operations officer whom Sonny Crockett knew from his military service in South Vietnam.

Liddy co-starred on 18 Wheels of Justice as the crime boss Jacob Calder from January 12, 2000, to June 6, 2001. He appeared on a celebrity edition Fear Factor, the show's series finale, on September 12, 2006 (filmed in November 2005). At 75, Liddy was the oldest contestant ever to appear on the show. He beat the competition in the first two stunts, winning two motorcycles custom built by Metropolitan Chopper.

Liddy was also an interviewee in the 2006 documentary The U.S. vs. John Lennon, as well as a commercial spokesman for Rosland Capital, selling gold on television commercials.

== Personal life ==
Liddy was married to Frances Purcell-Liddy, a native of Poughkeepsie, New York, for 53 years until her death on February 5, 2010. She was a teacher. The couple had five children: Thomas, Alexandra, Grace, James, and Raymond. Raymond became a deputy attorney general but was convicted of possession of child sexual assault materials and disbarred. James was a Navy SEAL who co-authored with his father Fight Back: Tackling Terrorism Liddy Style in 2006 and currently serves on the Board of Directors of Tharimmune, a position he was appointed in June 2025.

In his later life, Liddy was an opponent of animal experimentation.

== Death ==
Liddy died on March 30, 2021, at age 90, at his daughter's house in Fairfax County, Virginia, while suffering from Parkinson's disease.

== Portrayals ==
- Dave Thomas portrayed G Gordon Liddy in SCTV’s skit “Mrs Falbo’s Tiny Town”
- In the 1979 miniseries Blind Ambition, adapted from John Dean's book of the same title, Liddy was played by actor William Daniels.
- Liddy was portrayed by Robert Conrad and child actor Danny Lloyd in the 1982 television film, Will: G. Gordon Liddy, based on his autobiography.
- Comic book author Alan Moore has stated that the character of The Comedian (a.k.a. Edward Blake) from his graphic novel Watchmen was based in a large part on Liddy.
- He was played by John Diehl in Oliver Stone's film Nixon (1995).
- Harry Shearer portrayed Liddy in Andrew Fleming's comedy film Dick (1999).
- In Gaslit, Liddy was played by Shea Whigham.
- White House Plumbers, a five-part limited series on HBO, features the behind-the-scenes actions of Liddy in a portrayal by Justin Theroux.

== Publications ==
=== Articles ===
- "American Nightmare" (November 1977). Chic. vol. 2, no. 1.
- "Ten Things That Make Me Laugh". (January 1983). Playboy.
- "Rules of the Game" (January 1989). OMNI

=== Books ===
- Liddy, G. Gordon (1979). Out of Control. St. Martin's Press. ISBN 978-0-312-59065-9.
- Liddy, G. Gordon (1980). Will: The Autobiography of G. Gordon Liddy. St. Martin's Press. ISBN 978-0-312-88014-9.
- Liddy, G. Gordon (1990). The Monkey Handlers. St. Martin's Press. ISBN 978-0-312-05127-3.
- Liddy, G. Gordon (2002). When I Was a Kid, This Was a Free Country. Regnery. ISBN 978-0-312-05127-3.
- Liddy, G. Gordon with Cdr. James G. Liddy, J. Michael Barrett and Joel Selanikio, M.D. (2006). Fight Back: Tackling Terrorism, Liddy Style. St. Martin's Press. ISBN 978-0-312-05127-3.

== See also ==
- List of people pardoned or granted clemency by the president of the United States
