= Jack Caulfield =

American security operative officer (1929–2012)

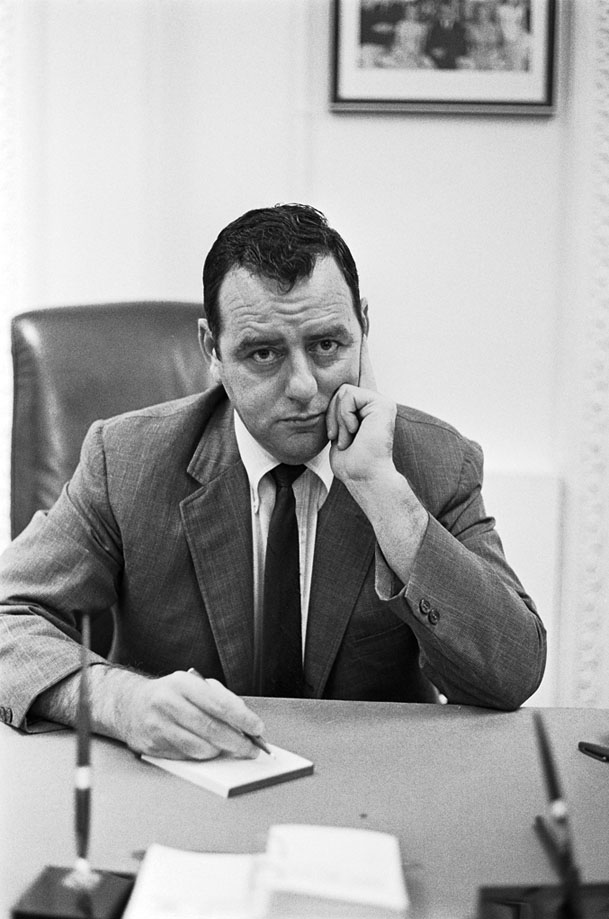
Portrait of Staff Assistant Jack Caulfield

John James "Jack" Caulfield (March 12, 1929 – June 17, 2012) was an American security operative and law enforcement officer. He was a member of the Richard Nixon administration around the time of the Watergate Scandal, though he avoided prosecution.

== Biography ==
Caulfield was born in The Bronx, New York City. He attended Wake Forest University on a basketball scholarship as well as Fordham University and the John Jay College of Criminal Justice. He served in the United States Army during the Korean War. From 1953 to 1968, he was an officer with the New York City Police Department (NYPD).

In 1968, Caulfield left the NYPD and joined the Nixon administration as a security operative. He was involved in Operation Sandwedge with H. R. Haldeman and John Ehrlichman, where he was tasked with setting up a clandestine intelligence-gathering operation against the political enemies of the Nixon administration. At one point, Caulfield suggested firebombing the Brookings Institution, a think tank critical of Nixon. For his part, Caulfield said the idea had originated not with him but with Charles Colson, special counsel to the president, and that he, Caulfield, had actually pleaded with White House Counsel John Dean to get him out of the "asinine" assignment. Colson denied coming up with the idea, although an associate said he might have suggested it as a "joke." In any event, the plan was dropped.

In 1972, Caulfield was appointed as assistant director of criminal enforcement at the U.S. Bureau of Alcohol, Tobacco, Firearms and Explosives (ATF). In 1973, while at the ATF, Caulfield was sent by the Nixon administration to offer clemency to Watergate Hotel burglar James W. McCord Jr. in an attempt to prevent McCord from testifying against the administration. McCord was eventually sentenced to prison for his involvement in Watergate. Caulfield testified before the United States Senate Watergate Committee but avoided prosecution. Before testifying, he resigned from the ATF after serving only nine months.

Caulfield's later career was as an executive at an aerosol valve plant in Yonkers, New York. The plant was owned by Robert Abplanalp, a close friend of Nixon's. Caulfield died in 2012 in Vero Beach, Florida, survived by his wife, three sons, and nine grandchildren.
