= Steven Rea =

American poet, journalist and film critic

- Born: London, England
- Education: San Francisco State University; University of Iowa
- Occupations: Author; film critic; journalist
- Writing career
- Period: 1975–present
- Subjects: Film, pop music, books, cycling
- Website: www.ridesabike.com

Steven Rea (also known as Steven X. Rea) is an American journalist, film critic, web producer, and writer. He was a film critic for The Philadelphia Inquirer from 1992 through late 2016.

== Early life ==
Rea was born in London, and raised in New York City. He is a graduate of Stuyvesant High School in New York. Rea went to the West Coast for college, earning an undergraduate degree in English and Creative Writing from San Francisco State University. He attended the Writers Workshop graduate program at the University of Iowa.

== Career ==
Rea has written for multiple publications since 1975, as well as working for major record labels such as Island Records. In 1982, he joined The Philadelphia Inquirer, where he covered pop culture topics including movies, pop music and books. He became one of its film critics in 1992 and left that post in late 2016. Other periodicals for which he has written include: Entertainment Weekly, TV Guide, Family Fun, Crawdaddy!, Music World, Phonograph Record Magazine, High Fidelity, Folk Scene, Los Angeles, New West, Trouser Press, Oui, Chic, Record World, and the Los Angeles Herald Examiner. His film reviews and movie columns have been syndicated.

Rea was an adjunct professor in the Cinema and Television program at the Antoinette Westphal College of Media Arts and Design at Drexel University. He hosts Talk Cinema events. He served on the Narrative Features jury of the 2012 Florida Film Festival and the FIPRESCI jury at the 2014 Palm Springs International Film Festival. He is a member of the National Society of Film Critics (NSFC).

Rea is the author of Hollywood Rides a Bike: Cycling with the Stars (2012), an expansion on his blog featuring photos of stars riding bikes, in which Rea explores his obsession with the details of these images and stARS. It received good reviews from The Telegraph (UK) and the San Francisco Chronicle. He later published Hollywood Cafe: Coffee With The Stars (2016), which was favorably covered in The New York Times, the Los Angeles Times, Metro US, and numerous other publications and websites. He is the curator of the Tumblr blog, Rides a Bike www.ridesabike.com. His essay on the British New Wave is published in the book European Cinema (2012).

Additionally, Rea has worked as an editor and written fiction. His poetry has been published in The Paris Review and The New York Quarterly.

== Personal life ==
Rea lived in Los Angeles at the start of his career, but he and his wife have long resided in Center City, Philadelphia.
