= Brian Lapping =

English journalist and television producer

Brian Michael Lapping CBE
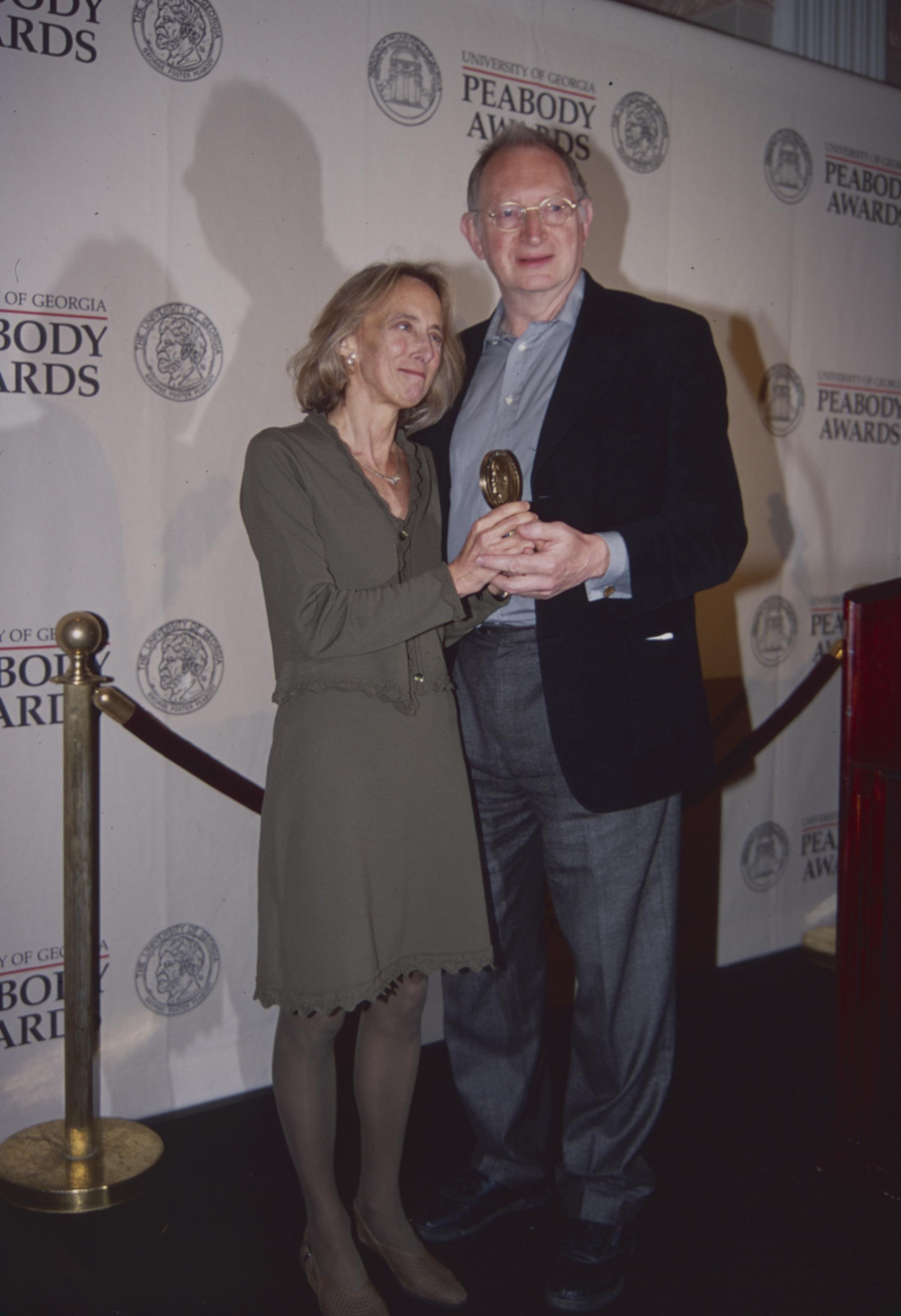
- Brian Lapping and Norma Percy at the 59th Annual Peabody Awards, 2000.
- Born: Brian Michael Lapping; 13 September 1937 (age 88)
- Education: University of Cambridge
- Occupations: Journalist, historian, producer
- Spouse: Anne Shirley Lucas Lapping (m. 1963)
- Awards: Commander of the Order of the British Empire, 2005
- Website: https://www.brooklapping.com/

Brian Michael Lapping CBE (born 13 September 1937) is an English journalist, television producer and historian. Lapping is also the chair and founding member of Brook Lapping, a television and radio production company focused on the production of historical documentaries.

== Education ==
Lapping was educated at the City of London School for Boys, an independent school in central London, followed by Pembroke College, Cambridge, where he read for a degree in History. While at Cambridge he was a member of the university's Labour club.

== Career ==
Lapping began his career as a journalist working for the Daily Mirror, The Guardian and the Financial Times, before moving to producing documentaries, first for Granada Television, then for his own production studio Brian Lapping Associates. During the 1960s, he was also editor of Venture, the Fabian Society's monthly journal, and deputy editor of the influential social science magazine New Society, where he worked alongside Paul Barker.

In 1997, Brian Lapping Associates merged with Brook Associates to form Brook Lapping Productions. Notable television productions produced by Lapping include Obama's White House (2016), Putin, Russia and the West (2011), The Death of Yugoslavia (1995) and End of Empire (1985).

== Personal life ==
Lapping is married to Anne Lapping, and they both live in London, England. Lapping remains a member of The Fabian Society.

== Awards ==
=== State awards ===
Lapping, along with his wife, was awarded the title of Commander of the Order of the British Empire in the 2005 Queen's New Year Honours List for services to broadcasting.

- 2005: Commander of the Order of the British Empire

=== Media awards ===
- 2017: British Academy Television Award Nominee – Best Current Affairs
- 2004: British Academy Television Award Nominee – Best Current Affairs
- 2003: Alan Clark Award
- 2003: Harvey Lee Award

== Filmography ==
- Inside Obama's White House (2016)
- Exposure (2015)
- Putin, Russia and the West (2011)
- Iran and the West (2009)
- Spy Secrets (2004)
- Innovation: Life, Inspired (2004)
- Beauty of Snakes (2003)
- I Met Adolf Eichmann (2002)
- To Kill and Kill Again (2002)
- Queen Victoria's Empire (2001)
- Endgame in Ireland (2001)
- The Fall of Milosevic (2001)
- American Experience (2000)
- Finest Hour (1999)
- The 50 Years War: Israel and the Arabs (1999)
- Hostage: The Story of the Beirut Hostages, 1984–1991 (1999)
- The Death of Yugoslavia (1995)
- Death of Apartheid (1995)
- Off the Back of a Lorry (1992)
- Breakthrough at Reykjavik (1987)
- Apartheid (1986)
- End of Empire (1985)
- Cyprus: Britain's Grim Legacy (1984)
- World in Action (1971–1981)
- Politics What's it all About? (1980)
- Chrysler and the Cabinet (1976)

== Publications ==
- End of Empire (1985)
- Apartheid: A History (1987)
- The State of the Nation: The Bounds of Freedom (1980)
- The Labour Government, 1964–70 (1970)
- More power to the people: Young Fabian essays on democracy in Britain (1968)

== See also ==
- Brook Lapping
- Norma Percy
