= Mick Gold =

- Born: Michael Gold; August 7, 1947 (age 79); London, England
- Education: Sussex University; Royal College of Art
- Occupations: documentary film maker, photographer and journalist

Mick Gold (born Michael Gold, London, 7 August 1947) is a British documentary film maker, photographer and journalist, who has written for publications such as Creem, Melody Maker, and Let It Rock.

He has produced and directed six episodes of the BBC2 art history series The Private Life of a Masterpiece, and four films for the Channel 4 series Dispatches. In 1995 he won the Outstanding Historical Programming Emmy award for his Watergate documentary series.

== Career ==
Gold studied English literature at Sussex University, followed by a degree in film and TV production at the Royal College of Art. From 1972 to 1978, he photographed and wrote about rock music for a variety of publications including Creem, Melody Maker, and Let It Rock. In 1976, he published Rock On the Road, a collection of photo-essays about rock music and its sub-cultural audiences. Contributors to the book included Simon Frith and John Pidgeon.

The Arts Council of Great Britain funded several of his arts documentaries, including Europe After the Rain (1978), a history of Dada and Surrealism, and Schiele in Prison (1980), which dramatised the prison diary of Viennese artist Egon Schiele.

Gold co-directed Hostage (1999), a series of three films for Channel Four about the hostage crisis in Lebanon from 1984 to 1991. The series won first prize at the 1999 Festival International du Film d'Histoire, Pessac.

Gold has produced and directed several history series for BBC2, including Watergate (1994), a five-hour series about the downfall of President Nixon which won a Primetime Emmy Award, and a duPont Columbia Award. Gold co-directed Death of Apartheid (US title: Mandela's Fight For Freedom) (1995), a three-hour history of how Nelson Mandela negotiated his way out of prison and into power as the first President of an ANC government of South Africa. The series was written by the South African journalist, Allister Sparks, and it was nominated for an NAACP Image Award in 1996. Endgame In Ireland (2001), won a Peabody Award for its "enlightening exploration of the tortuous complexities of international peace negotiations in Northern Ireland". Gold also produced and directed six episodes of the BBC2 art history series The Private Life of a Masterpiece, focusing on paintings by Velázquez, Goya, Delacroix, Degas, Dalí, and Rogier van der Weyden.

Gold directed four films for the Channel 4 series Dispatches about UK political developments, written and presented by journalist Andrew Rawnsley, ending with A Year Inside Number 10. In 2007, Gold produced and directed a controversial documentary about US foreign policy presented by Richard Perle, "The Case for War", which was broadcast by PBS as part of the series America at a Crossroads. In 2013, Gold produced and directed a series on the history of the blues, Blues America, which was broadcast on BBC Four.

In 2016, Gold produced and directed The Arc of History, the fourth film in the series Inside Obama's White House, produced by Brook Lapping for BBC2. Gold was producer-director of a two part history of Cuba, focusing on the ways in which the Cuban Revolution impacted on global politics, beginning with the Cold War and ending with President Obama's détente with Raúl Castro. The series was broadcast by Arte in December 2019, titled Cuba: la révolution et le monde. Le Monde wrote: "Diplomacy is a complex field, but it can be exciting, even on television. And when it comes to the foreign policy pursued for sixty years by a country as unusual as Cuba, this line of attack can result in a breathtaking TV programme." A revised version was broadcast by BBC2 in August 2020, titled Cuba: Castro vs the World.

== Awards ==
- 2002, nominated, BAFTA Awards, Best current affairs, for Endgame in Ireland.
- 1995, won, Emmy award, Outstanding Historical Programming, for Watergate
