= Nicholas Selby =

British actor (1925–2010)

- Hugh Laurie (left), Paula Jacobs (centre) and Nicholas Selby in Jeeves and Wooster (episode 3, 1990)
- Born: James Ivor Selby; 13 September 1925; Holborn, London, England
- Died: 14 September 2010 (aged 85); London, England
- Education: Royal Central School of Speech and Drama
- Occupation: Actor
- Years active: 1970–1999
- Spouse(s): Kathleen Rayner (m. 19??; died 2007)
- Children: 1

Nicholas Selby (born James Ivor Selby, 13 September 1925 – 14 September 2010) was a British film, television and theatre actor. He appeared in more than one hundred television dramas on the BBC and ITV during the course of his career, including Our Friends in the North, Poldark and House of Cards. Selby was also a long-standing member of the Royal Shakespeare Company.

Selby was born in Holborn, London on 13 September 1925. He served in the British Army during World War II, making his stage debut in Dangerous Corner at Preston, Lancashire, for the forces' entertainment organisation ENSA. In 1948 he enrolled at the Central School of Speech and Drama, receiving commendation for his student performance in Mary Hayley Bell's Men in Shadow. There then followed seasons in repertory at Liverpool, Birmingham, Coventry, York, Hornchurch and Cambridge. His first professional West End appearance was in 1959, in William Douglas-Home's Aunt Edwina, followed by his creation of the hit-man Ben in the London premiere of Harold Pinter's The Dumb Waiter at the Hampstead Theatre Club in January 1960. In 1963 Selby made his first appearances for the Royal Shakespeare Company, as Casca in Julius Caesar, the Bishop of Winchester in The Wars of The Roses and Antonio in The Tempest. His association with the company lasted for ten years, until he followed Peter Hall to the new National Theatre in London in 1976. In his first season there he appeared as Menander in Tamburlaine and the Captain in Tales from the Vienna Woods. He was van Swieten in the inaugural production Amadeus and the parliamentary Speaker in The Madness of George III. His last stage role was as Dilly Knox in Breaking the Code in 1987.

Selby died in London on 14 September 2010, at the age of 85. He was predeceased by his wife, Kathleen Rayner, for whom he had been caring during her ill-health for many years, and was survived by their daughter, Alison, and two grandchildren.

== Filmography ==
=== Film ===
Year	Title	Role	Notes
1968	A Midsummer Night's Dream	Egeus	
1971	Macbeth	Duncan	
1980	Schiele in Prison	The Judge	
1985	Mata Hari	Von Jagow	
1992	Christopher Columbus: The Discovery	Monsignor Camos	
1994	The Madness of King George	Speaker	
1998	Stiff Upper Lips	Don 1	

=== Television ===
Year	Title	Role	Notes
1958	The Diary of Samuel Pepys	Wounded Seaman	Episode: #9
1961	Alfred Hitchcock Presents	Process Server	Season 7 Episode 9: "I Spy"
1962	Compact	Jimmy Saunders	48 episodes
1966	Watch the Birdies	Detective Inspector Clayton	4 episodes
1975	Poldark	Nicholas Warleggan	7 episodes
1985	Blott on the Landscape	General Burnett	6 episodes
