= Will: G. Gordon Liddy =

- The video tape cover for Will.
- Genre: Biography; Drama
- Written by: Frank Abatemarco
- Directed by: Robert Lieberman
- Starring: Robert Conrad; John Mahoney; Danny Lloyd
- Music by: Mike Post; Pete Carpenter
- Country of origin: United States
- Original language: English

Production
- Executive producer: Joan Conrad
- Producer: John Ashley
- Production location: DeKalb, Illinois
- Cinematography: Paul Vom Brack
- Editor: Howard S. Deane
- Running time: 100 min.
- Production company: A. Shane Company
- Budget: $2 million

Original release
- Network: NBC
- Release: January 10, 1982

Will: G. Gordon Liddy is an American television film which first aired on NBC on January 10, 1982. The film depicts the rise and fall of Watergate co-conspirator G. Gordon Liddy. Liddy was portrayed by two actors: American actor Robert Conrad played Liddy as an adult and child actor Danny Lloyd portrayed him in his youth. Other figures associated with the Watergate scandal and portrayed in this film include Jeb Magruder and John Dean. The movie was directed by Robert Lieberman and was based on Liddy's 1980 autobiography.

== Plot ==
The film follows the rise and fall of convicted Watergate conspirator G. Gordon Liddy. Robert Conrad is cast as the adult Liddy, who is sentenced to 20 years in prison. The film follows the convicted felon through the four and half years he spent behind bars. While in prison, the film portrays Liddy as capable and able to match up to any man in the prison. The film includes several famous details from Liddy's 1980 autobiography including the legendary "hand held over the burning flame," and Liddy's oath, "I will kill for you, Mr. President."

== Background and production ==
The film was based on Liddy's 1980 bestselling autobiography, Will: The Autobiography of G. Gordon Liddy, and directed by Robert Lieberman. Courtroom scenes for the movie were shot in Illinois, at the 1905 DeKalb County Courthouse.

It was produced by John Ashley, a former actor who was a friend of Conrad's. Ashley recalls adapting the book being very difficult, not because of censorship but because it was hard to know what to leave out.

== Cast ==
- John Byner as the voice of Richard Nixon
- Robert Conrad as G. Gordon Liddy
  - Danny Lloyd as Young G. Gordon Liddy
- Katherine Cannon as Fran Liddy
- Gary Bayer as Jeb Magruder
- Peter Ratray as John Dean
- James Rebhorn as Peter Maroulis
- Red West as Kaworski
- Maurice Woods as Copperhead

== Distribution ==
The made-for-television film debuted in the United States on NBC on January 10, 1982. Copies of the film are held in the Nixon Presidential Materials collection of the U.S. National Archives.

== Reception ==
Will was the subject of a review by John O'Connor of The New York Times. While O'Connor praised Lieberman, screenwriter Frank Abatemarco and Conrad, he questioned the overall purpose of the film. He rebuked Liddy, stating, "What purpose is ultimately served? The basic criterion seems to be that it sells, enabling various companies and individuals, including Mr. Liddy, to make some money" and comparing it with Helter Skelter, a CBS television movie about Charles Manson and the Manson Family murders. Noting that the source for the film was an autobiography, he went on to pan the producers as "ambivalent" toward the film's subject. O'Connor concluded his review by noting the film's attempt to gloss over the darker parts of Liddy's history: "After a while, it gets increasingly difficult to remember that this law-and-order fanatic is not beyond putting himself above the law, that he seems to exist in a world of absurd macho fantasy (his book refers to 'my best Effrem Zimbalist Jr. (sic) manner' or 'I gave him Broderick Crawford in Highway Patrol'), and that his basic social and political instincts are fascistic."

Comedy sketch show SCTV spoofed Will, depicting Liddy as a rat-eating sociopath who repeatedly suggests to Nixon that they kill their political opponents with piano wire. Canadian actor Dave Thomas played Liddy in the spoof.

In the September/October 2004 issue of Washington Free Press Dr. John Ruhland included the film on a list of "Rad Videos" summarized as "Dirty Politics in the United States." He called the film a "campy and terribly acted account of the Watergate break-in." He noted the film's value as a tool for giving a view into the workings of the United States government.
