= Maurice Woods =

American actor

- Born: May 28, 1938
- Died: November 1, 1983 (aged 45); Manhattan, New York, U.S.
- Occupation: Actor
- Years active: 1975 – 1983
- Spouse: Lauren
- Children: Simeon and Patricia

Maurice Woods (May 28, 1938 – November 1, 1983) was an American actor.

He was an actor, known for Trading Places (1983), Attica (1980) and Will: The Autobiography of G. Gordon Liddy (1982)

Away from the film industry, Woods was seen in many Off Broadway and Off Off Broadway productions, such as “The Last Street Play”. On November 1, 1983, Woods died of cancer, in the Lenox Hill Hospital, Manhattan. He was aged 45. He was survived by his wife, Lauren Woods and children, Simeon and Patricia.
