= Aunt Edwina =

1959 play

- Written by: William Douglas Home
- Original language: English
- Genre: Comedy

Premiere
- Date premiered: 14 September 1959
- Place premiered: Devonshire Park Theatre, Eastbourne

Aunt Edwina is a 1959 comedy play by the British writer William Douglas Home.

It premiered at Devonshire Park Theatre in Eastbourne, before beginning a run of 101 performances in London between 3 November 1959 and 6 February 1960.The production was staged initially at the Fortune Theatre in the West End before transferring to the Lyric Theatre in Hammersmith. The London cast included Henry Kendall, Margaretta Scott, Cyril Raymond (later replaced by Geoffrey Lumsden), Nicholas Selby, Peter Cellier and Hilary Tindall.

== Bibliography ==
- Wearing, J.P. The London Stage 1950-1959: A Calendar of Productions, Performers, and Personnel. Rowman & Littlefield, 2014.
