= Laura Silber =

American academic

Laura Silber is the Vice President for Advocacy and Communications at the Open Society Foundations, where she runs the Communications department and oversees advocacy strategy and public identity. Since 2007 she has been an adjunct professor at Columbia University's School of International and Public Affairs.

Prior to joining the Open Society Foundations in 2000, Silber was a contributing writer at Talk magazine. She covered the United Nations for the Financial Times from 1997-99. She was also a visiting scholar at the Remarque Institute at New York University. From 1990-1997, she was the Balkans correspondent for the Financial Times and covered Yugoslavia's violent disintegration.

She is the co-author, with Allan Little, of Yugoslavia: Death of a Nation (published as The Death of Yugoslavia outside of the United States), which was selected for the New York Times notable book list. She was a consultant to the accompanying 1995 BBC television documentary series, which won the BAFTA, duPont Gold Baton, and Peabody Award.

The documentary indicted the Serbian and Croatian leadership, revealed their virulent nationalism, and deplored the lack of international intervention. She has contributed to a wide range of publications including The New York Times, The Washington Post, The Los Angeles Times and The New York Review of Books.

Silber was a Fulbright Scholar in Yugoslavia and received a Master of International Affairs from Columbia University and a B.A. from Carleton College. She lives in New York with her family.
