= Iran and the West =

- Produced by: Norma Percy
- Distributed by: BBC
- Release date: 7 February 2009
- Running time: 60 min (3 parts)
- Country: UK
- Language: English

Iran and the West a three-part British documentary series shown in February 2009 on BBC Two to mark the 30th anniversary of the Iranian Revolution. The first episode was shown at 9:00pm on Saturday 7 February with parts two and three shown on consecutive Saturdays. The documentary looks at the relationship between Iran and the countries of the west and features interviews with politicians who have played significant roles in events involving Iran, Europe and the United States since 1979.

The series is produced by Norma Percy, whose previous series include The Death of Yugoslavia and Israel and the Arabs: Elusive Peace. Like her previous series, Iran and the West relies extensively on interviews with key players involved in the issue.

It won a Peabody Award in 2009 "for its eminently watchable and historically invaluable examination of one of the world’s most intractable hotspots."

== Episodes ==
| No. | Title | Contributors | Original release date |
|---|---|---|---|
| 1 | "The Man Who Changed the World" | Jimmy Carter, Walter Mondale, Warren Christopher, Mohsen Rafiqdoust, Farah Pahlavi, Fidel Castro | 7 February 2009 |
Key figures tell the inside story of Ayatollah Khomeini's rise to power, the fall and exile of Shah Mohammad Reza Pahlavi and the events surrounding the Iran hostage crisis.
| 2 | "The Pariah State" | Akbar Hashemi Rafsanjani, Mohammad Khatami, George Shultz, Warren Christopher, Madeleine Albright | 14 February 2009 |
Inside stories are told by two ex-presidents of Iran and leading westerners. Subjects covered in this edition include the Lebanon hostage crisis, the Iran–Iraq War, the death of Ayatollah Khomeini and the changing political climate of the Middle East following the Iraqi invasion of Kuwait and the 1991 Gulf War.
| 3 | "Nuclear Confrontation" | Mohammad Khatami, Vladimir Putin, Jack Straw | 21 February 2009 |
The inside story of the West's continuing nuclear confrontation with Iran. Subjects covered in this episode include the rise of the Taliban in Iran's neighbour Afghanistan, the assassination of Ahmad Shah Massoud, the September 11 terrorist attacks, the Iraq War and Iran's emerging nuclear program.

== See also ==
- Afghanistan–Iran relations
- Iran–Iraq relations
- Iran–Israel relations
- Iran–United States relations
- Iran–United Kingdom relations
