= Let It Rock (magazine) =

Pop music publication

Let It Rock was a monthly British music magazine, which featured lengthy critical articles, record reviews, and feature articles covering a wide spectrum of popular music, including soul, reggae, and blues. Between October 1972 and December 1975, 35 issues of the magazine were published in London, by Hanover Books, sometime in Berners Street W1. The publisher was Peter Shepherd, who also published other music publications including Folk Review and Country Music. Dave Laing was the founding editor; John Pidgeon took over as editor in October 1973. The reviews editor was Simon Frith, and Charlie Gillett was consultant editor. Other contributors included John Peel, Lester Bangs, Michael Gray, Mick Gold, Mick Houghton, David Downing, Gary Herman, Idris Walters, Karl Dallas, Ian Hoare and Phil Hardy, and the soul music column was written by Pete Wingfield. The initial art editor was John Finn. Designers and illustrators included Barney Bubbles, George Snow, Kevin Sparrow and Peter Till. The magazine struggled to achieve consistent sales of 20,000 and closed due to market forces. Music writers David Hepworth and Barney Hoskyns have called Let It Rock influential, and suggested that it was the precursor of such music publications as Q magazine and Mojo.
