= Norma Percy =

American film producer (born 1942)

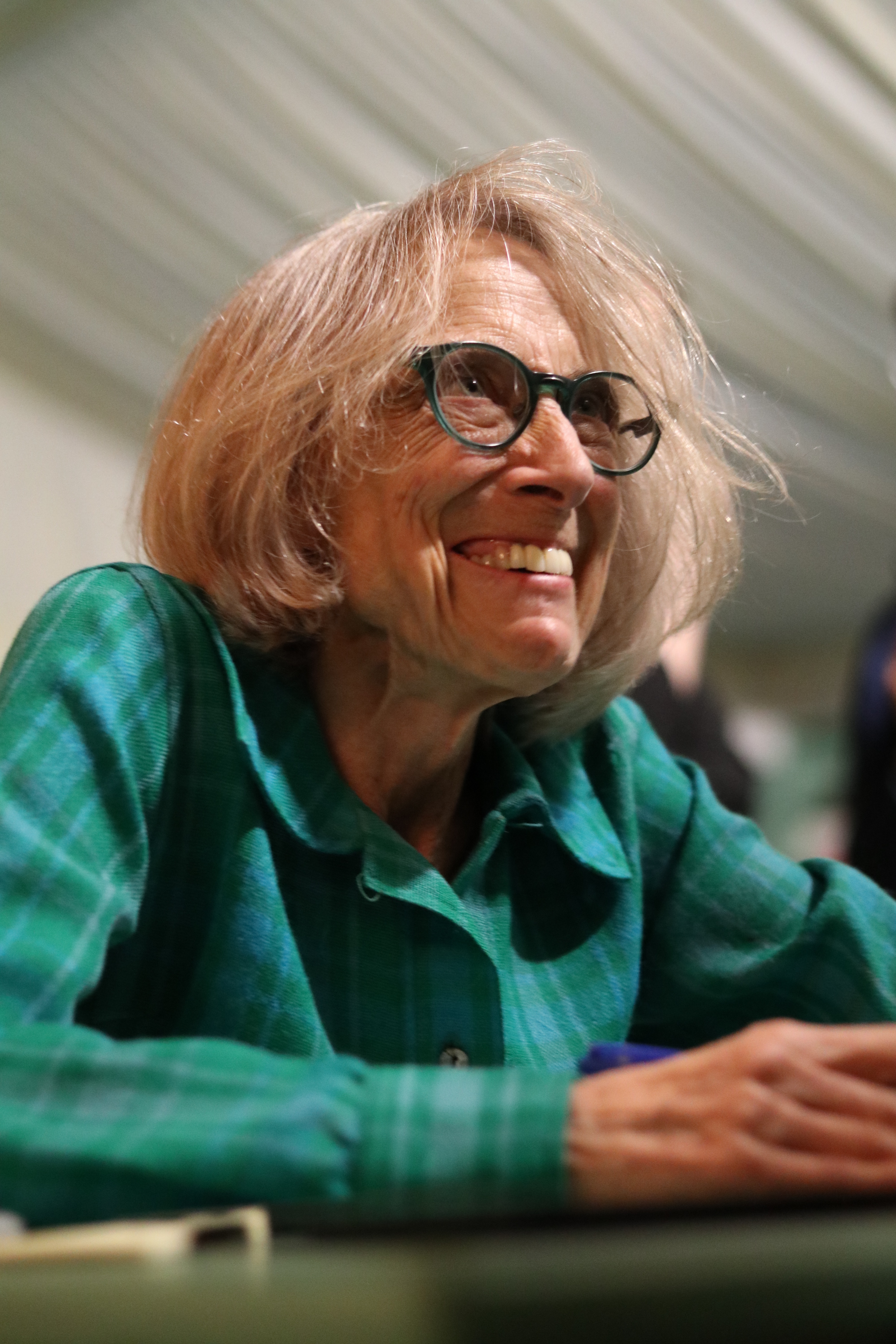
- Percy at the 2016 Hay Festival
- Born: 1942 (age 83–84); New York City, United States
- Education: Oberlin College; London School of Economics
- Occupations: Documentary film maker and producer
- Spouse: Steve Jones (m. 2004)
- Awards: Orwell Prize – Special Prize for Lifetime Achievement

Norma Percy (born April 1942) is an American-born, documentary film maker and producer. The documentaries she has produced in collaboration with Brian Lapping have covered many of the crises of the 20th century. In 2010, she was awarded the Orwell Prize "Special Prize for Lifetime Achievement".

== Early life ==
Percy was born and raised in New York City, United States. She studied politics at Oberlin College in Ohio, later studying for a master's degree at the London School of Economics.

She then became a researcher at the House of Commons, where she spent six years; in her time there, she worked as a researcher for the MP John Mackintosh, who recommended her to the Granada Television producer Brian Lapping when he was looking for a researcher for a documentary on the workings of Parliament called The State of the Nation.

== Career ==
Percy produced the Granada 14-part series End of Empire (1985), which explored the effects of the end of the British Empire in various former colonies, and worked with Lapping on the 1987 drama-documentary Breakthrough at Reykjavik, a reconstruction of the Reykjavík Summit between Ronald Reagan and Mikhail Gorbachev in 1986.

After fifteen years at Granada, Percy joined the newly formed production company Brian Lapping Associates in 1988. (When that company later merged with Brook Associates in 1997, she was a founding director of the new company Brook Lapping.)

The Percy-produced documentary series Watergate aired on the BBC and the Discovery Channel in 1994. Narrated by Daniel Schorr and directed by Mick Gold, this five-part series chronicled the Watergate scandal and featured exclusive interviews with many of the key participants in the events, including H. R. Haldeman, John Ehrlichman, John Dean and G. Gordon Liddy as well as former President Gerald Ford. The series won an Emmy Award.

The Death of Yugoslavia (1995), with Lapping as co-producer, covered the events that led to the collapse of the former Yugoslavia and the aftermath. The series again contained interviews with many of the major participants, including Slobodan Milošević and Radovan Karadžić. The series won a BAFTA Award as Best Factual Series for 1995. The Balkans were revisited in the 2001 series The Fall of Milošević, which dealt with the fall from power of the Serbian leader.

== Awards and recognition ==
Percy, along with Brian Lapping, was awarded the Alan Clarke Award (for outstanding contribution to Television) at the 2002 BAFTA awards.

Percy was made a Fellow of the Royal Television Society in 1999 and was awarded the Judges Prize by that society at the 2010 RTS Awards. In 2009, at the Grierson Awards, she, along with colleagues from the Brook Lapping production company, won the Best Documentary Series award for Iran and the West; Percy also received the Trustee's Prize by the Grierson Trust for her contributions to documentary film over the previous 30 years. The "Special Prize for Lifetime Achievement" was awarded to her at the Orwell Prize ceremony in 2010.

In 2009, The Guardian wrote of Percy: "Her documentaries stand out for their seriousness, but most of all for the extraordinary range of people who agree to appear on them. These programmes do not depend on one celebrity autobiography, or a handful of journalistic talking heads; they interrogate players from all sides with a respect for complexities that demands concentration."

In June 2025, Percy was the castaway on BBC Radio 4's Desert Island Discs, revealing many insights into the world leaders she has interviewed.

== Personal life ==
In 2004, Percy married the geneticist Steve Jones; the couple had lived together since 1977.

== Filmography ==
- Brexit: A Very British Civil War (2026)
- Clash of the Super Powers: America v China (2026)
- Live Aid at 40: When Rock 'n' Roll Took on the World (2025)
- Israel and the Palestinians: The Road to 7th October (2025)
- Putin vs the West (2023)
- Trump Takes on the World (2021)
- Cuba: Castro vs the World (2020)
- Inside Europe: Ten Years of Turmoil (2019)
- Inside Obama's White House (2016)
- The Iraq War (2013)
- Putin, Russia and the West (2012)
- Iran and the West (2009)
- Israel and the Arabs: Elusive Peace (2005)
- Endgame in Ireland (2001)
- The Fall of Milošević (2001)
- The American Experience - Nixon's China Game episode producer (2001)
- The 50 Years War: Israel and the Arabs (1998)
- The Death of Yugoslavia (1995)
- Watergate (1994)
- Timewatch
- Countdown to War (1989)
- Breakthrough at Reykjavik (1987)
- End of Empire (1985)
