= Danny Lloyd =

American former child actor (born 1972)

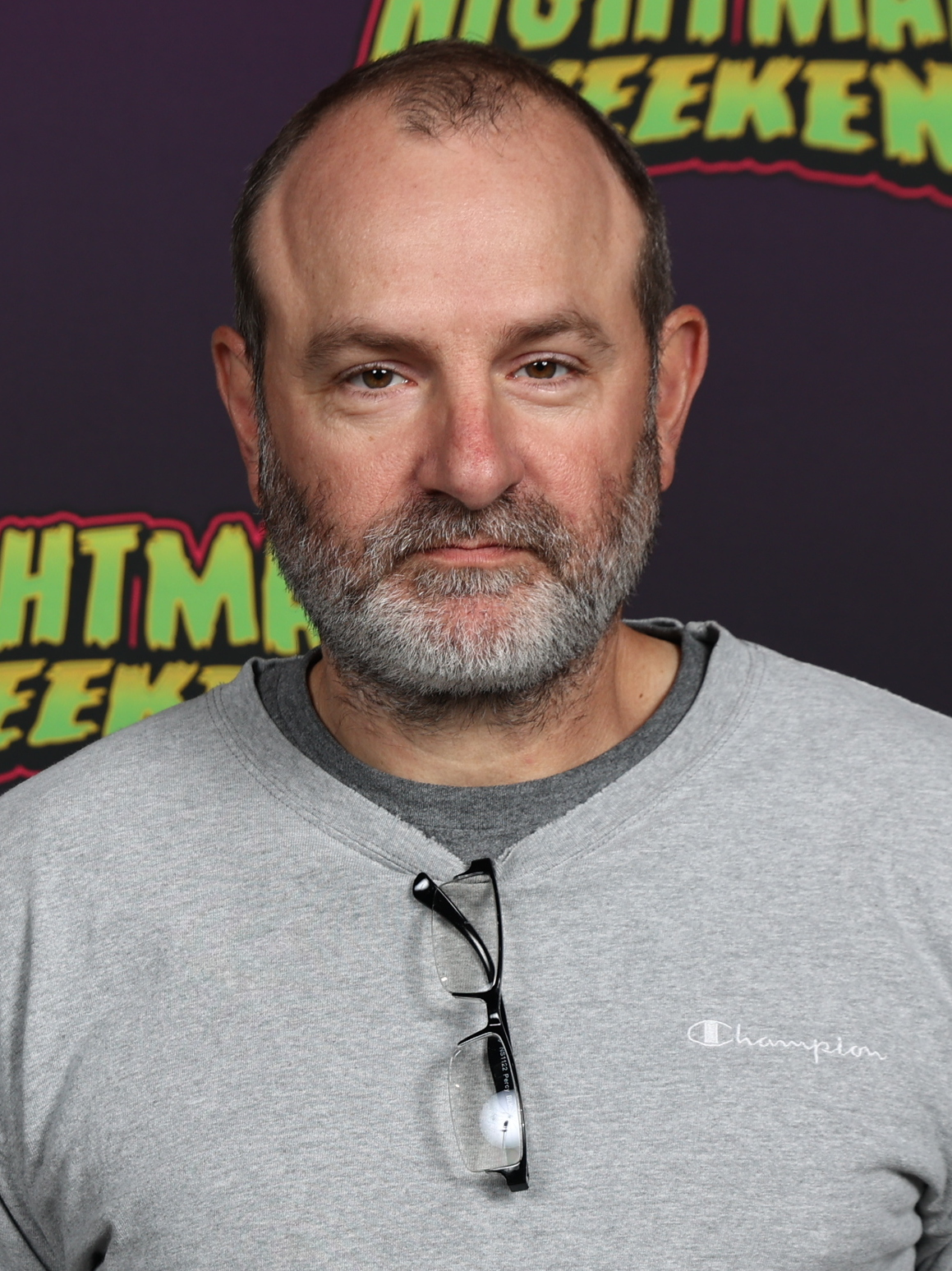
- Lloyd in 2023
- Born: Daniel Edward Sidney Lloyd; October 13, 1972 (age 54); Tremont, Illinois, U.S.
- Occupation: Actor
- Years active: 1978–1982, 2019
- Known for: The Shining
- Children: 4

Daniel Edward Sidney Lloyd (born October 13, 1972) is an American former child actor best known for his role as Danny Torrance in Stanley Kubrick's The Shining. After appearing in Will: G. Gordon Liddy, Lloyd retired from acting. He became a professor at the Elizabethtown Community and Technical College in 2004.

== Life and career ==
Lloyd was born in Tremont, Illinois. At the age of six, he was cast as Danny Torrance in Stanley Kubrick's The Shining, a horror film adaptation of Stephen King's 1977 novel of the same name. He was selected for the role due to his ability to maintain his concentration for extended periods. Kubrick was protective of Lloyd during production; he believed he was acting in a drama instead of a horror movie. Lloyd said in an interview with The Guardian that "The Shining was a good experience. I look back on it fondly. What happened to me was I didn't really do much else after the film. So you kind of have to lay low and live a normal life." He was not allowed to watch the film until five years after production.

After playing a young G. Gordon Liddy in the television film Will: G. Gordon Liddy (1982), Lloyd retired from acting. In 2004, he became an associate professor at the department of biology at the Elizabethtown Community and Technical College in Elizabethtown, Kentucky.

In 2019, Lloyd made a cameo as a spectator at a baseball game in Mike Flanagan's horror film Doctor Sleep, a sequel to The Shining. He was cast after being contacted by Flanagan on Twitter for the role. After seeing the trailer, Lloyd remarked: "It looked really good, I was curious since there is a fine line they have to walk with Stephen King and Stanley Kubrick. It looks like they found a way to pay tribute to both."

== Personal life ==
Lloyd is married and has four children. He keeps his personal life private and rarely accepts interviews.

== Filmography ==
Year	Title	Role	Notes
1980	The Shining	Danny Torrance	Film
1982	Will: G. Gordon Liddy	Young G. Gordon Liddy	Television film
2019	Doctor Sleep	Spectator	Film; cameo
