= The Monkey Handlers =

Thriller novel by G. Gordon Liddy

- Author: G. Gordon Liddy
- Language: English
- Publication date: 1990

The Monkey Handlers is a 1990 thriller novel by G. Gordon Liddy, published by St. Martin's Press.

A real estate agent in the Hudson Valley region, Michael Stone, who formerly served as a Navy SEAL, has to stop a group of people from West Germany who experiment on animals as well as some Islamists. He had served with Saul, whose sister Sara Rosen faced arrest for trespassing in a pharmaceutical facility owned by the West German company Riegar, headed by Walter Hoess.

Publishers Weekly stated that "Liddy's touch is deft" though the book had an "abrupt" ending.

Kirkus Reviews stated that the novel "appeals powerfully to the frustrations and fantasies of audiences fed up with the system: this is just the thing for readers impatient with the rat race who wish they could arm themselves and click on." The review described the novel as appealing to "every xenophobic base".
