= Tom Liddy =

American radio host (born 1962)

Personal details
- Born: Thomas Liddy; July 20, 1962 (age 63) Poughkeepsie, New York, U.S.
- Party: Republican
- Spouse: Stacy Gretkowski (m. 1991)
- Children: 4
- Parent: G. Gordon Liddy (father)
- Education: Fordham University (BA, JD)

Military service
- Branch/service: United States Marine Corps (1986–1989)
- Unit: United States Marine Corps Reserve (1989–1998)

Thomas Liddy (born July 20, 1962) is an American attorney in Maricopa County, Arizona. He is the son of the Watergate figure G. Gordon Liddy.

== Early life and education ==
Liddy was born July 20, 1962, in Poughkeepsie, New York. He earned a Bachelor of Arts degree in history in 1986 and a Juris Doctor in 1992, both from Fordham University.

== Career ==
=== Legal work ===
After law school, he worked in a Washington, D.C., law firm for several years. From 1995 to 1998, he served as deputy counsel of the Republican National Committee, appointed by RNC chairman Haley Barbour. From 2003 to 2004, he served as the chairman of the Maricopa County Republican Party. In 2006, he was appointed by then-Mayor Phil Gordon to serve as chairman of the Phoenix Veterans Commission. Liddy also served as the litigation bureau chief of Maricopa County, where he was responsible for managing special litigation services. He has since worked in the Maricopa County Attorney's Office.

==== Major cases ====
- Friendly House v. Whiting, representing Maricopa County Sheriff Joe Arpaio, where he argued before U.S. District Court Judge Susan R. Bolton defending Arizona's controversial S.B. 1070
- Melendres v. Arpaio, with co-counsel Tim Casey, defended Sheriff Joe Arpaio and the Maricopa County Sheriff's Office in the three-week racial profiling trial, in the United States District Court for Arizona in the summer of 2012.
- In 2020, Liddy defended Maricopa County in Donald J. Trump for President, Inc. vs. Hobbs and Maricopa County. Liddy argued that Sharpie pens and "over votes" were not the reason that former Vice President Biden received more votes than President Trump in the November 3, 2020, election in Maricopa County. Once Maricopa County presented its evidence, the attorney for Donald Trump moved the court to dismiss the lawsuit.
- Lake v. Hobbs, representing Maricopa County, Liddy argued that Lake lost the election for governor of Arizona not because of voter suppression or printer errors, but because her campaign failed to get enough voters to cast their ballots for her.

=== 2000 congressional election ===
In 2000, Liddy was a Republican candidate for Arizona's 1st congressional district. He finished fourth in a field of five candidates with 20.70% of the votes. The winner was Jeff Flake with 31.80% who went on to win the seat in the general election.

=== Media ===
Liddy was a nationally syndicated conservative talk radio host. Along with Austin Hill, Liddy hosted the Liddy & Hill Show on KFYI from 2003 until moving to KKNT in October 2006. Liddy created "PC Friday" to mock the concept of political correctness and was known for his parody songs, such as "The Day Dan Rather Lied".

== Personal life ==
Liddy married his wife Stacy (née Gretkowski) in 1991 while in law school. Stacy has worked as an elementary school teacher. They have four children and live in Scottsdale, Arizona.
