= Death of Apartheid =

- Directed by: Stephen Clarke; Mick Gold; Stewart Lansley
- Produced by: Lisa Gartside
- Narrated by: Allister Sparks
- Production company: Brian Lapping Associates
- Distributed by: BBC
- Release date: 14 May 1995
- Running time: 50 min (3 parts)
- Country: UK
- Language: English

Death of Apartheid (US title: Mandela's Fight For Freedom) is the name of a three-part documentary series about the negotiations to end apartheid in South Africa and the first fully democratic election that followed. The series was first broadcast in May 1995, and produced by Brian Lapping Associates for the BBC, and co-produced by the Dutch broadcaster VPRO, the South African broadcaster SABC, and the Japanese broadcaster NHK.

The series was largely written and researched by Allister Sparks, who also narrated it. The series was accompanied by a book by Sparks, named Tomorrow Is Another Country.

== Episodes ==
Number	Title	Original airdate	Overview	Contributors
1	The Prisoner	14 May 1995	This episode focuses on Nelson Mandela's dialogue with the Apartheid government whilst he was still in prison.	
2	The Third Force	21 May 1995	This episode focuses on the bloodshed that occurred following Mandela's release from prison and the supposed "third force" controlling this.	Nelson Mandela, F. W. de Klerk, Thabo Mbeki, Cyril Ramaphosa, Mangosuthu Buthelezi, Adriaan Vlok, Johan Scheepers, Romeo Mbambo
3	The Whites' Last Stand	28 May 1995	This episode looks at attempts by the Afrikaner Weerstandsbeweging and some tribal states, including the Inkatha Freedom Party, to disrupt and prevent the first free election.	Nelson Mandela, Joe Slovo, Cyril Ramaphosa, Roelf Meyer, Pieter Mulder, Dawie De Villiers, Leon Wessels, Eugène Terre'Blanche, Constand Viljoen, Tertius Delport, Mac Maharaj, F. W. de Klerk, Rina Venter, Johann Kriegler, P. J. Seleke, Pik Botha, Jack Turner

== See also ==
- Negotiations to end apartheid in South Africa
