= Israel and the Arabs: Elusive Peace =

- Produced by: Norma Percy
- Distributed by: BBC
- Release date: 10 October 2005
- Running time: 60 min (3 parts)
- Country: UK
- Language: English

Israel and the Arabs: Elusive Peace is the name of a three-part British documentary series shown in October 2005 on BBC Two about the attempts to settle the Israeli–Palestinian conflict after the 2000 Camp David Summit.

The series was produced by Norma Percy, who had produced The Death of Yugoslavia before. Like her previous series, Israel and the Arabs: Elusive Peace relies extensively on in-depth interviews with key players involved in this issue, such as Ehud Barak, Bill Clinton, and Colin Powell.

== Episodes ==
Number	Title	Original airdate	Overview	Contributors
1	Clinton (1999/2000)	10 October 2005	Israeli Prime Minister Ehud Barak persuades President of the United States Bill Clinton to devote his last year-and-a-half in office to help settle the Israeli–Palestinian conflict once and for all. The 2000 Camp David Summit results in a failure though, partly due to Ariel Sharon's visit of to the Al-Aqsa Mosque compound on 28 September 2000.	Yasser Arafat; Ehud Barak; Bill Clinton; Ariel Sharon; Madeleine Albright
2	Arafat (2001/2002)	17 October 2005	The moderate Republican U.S. Secretary of State Colin Powell attempts to rekindle the peace process by negotiating with Palestinian leader Yasser Arafat. Powell's efforts are derailed, however, both by his hard-line fellow Republicans and by an uncompromising Yasser Arafat.	Ariel Sharon; Colin Powell; Shaul Mofaz; Anthony Zinni; Binyamin Ben-Eliezer; Shimon Peres; Richard Armitage
3	Sharon (2003–2005)	24 October 2005	U.S. President George W. Bush attempts to settle the Israeli-Palestinian conflict but Arab allies pressure him to push Israel's Prime Minister Ariel Sharon.	Ariel Sharon; Colin Powell; Shaul Mofaz; Benjamin Netanyahu; Richard Armitage
