= Fred Emery (journalist) =

British television presenter and journalist (1933–2025)

Frederick Emery (19 October 1933 – 15 August 2025) was a British television presenter and investigative journalist.

== Background ==
Fred Emery was born in south-west Essex on 19 October 1933. He attended Bancroft's School in north-east London from 1944 to 1951. He was head boy in 1951. He studied French and German at St John's College, Cambridge, before spending a year at Radio Bremen and then joining The Times as a new recruit in 1958.

Emery died on 15 August 2025, at the age of 91.

== Career ==
=== Newspapers ===
Emery had a distinguished career as a newspaper journalist. He served as a foreign correspondent covering the Vietnam War. During the 1970s he was Washington Bureau Chief for The Times throughout the Watergate scandal. He would publish in 1994 a detailed history of the scandal in Watergate: The Corruption of American Politics and the Fall of Richard Nixon, based on extensive interviews with key participants; according to The New York Times it "stands on its own as a comprehensive account of this century's most notorious political scandal." He also narrated an accompanying 5-part BBC documentary series. His archive from this research is held by Senate House Library, London.

=== Panorama ===
After leaving The Times, Emery was a presenter for the investigative current affairs programme Panorama, working on various episodes from 1978 to 1992. He interviewed Margaret Thatcher on 8 June 1983, on the eve of the 1983 general election. Among the episodes he presented was the controversial 1984 programme 'Maggie's Militant Tendency'. This episode would be the subject of a 1986 libel case brought by the Conservative MPs Neil Hamilton and Gerald Howarth which the BBC would eventually settle.

== See also ==
- Channel 4 News
