= Chic (pornographic magazine) =

Defunct American pornographic magazine

Cover of Chic magazine (September 1979)

Chic was an American pornographic magazine first issued by Larry Flynt, of Hustler fame, in November 1976. The publisher was CHIC Magazine Inc. based in Columbus, Ohio.

Intentionally less controversial than Hustler, but overall similar in layout and content, Chic was an attempt to emulate the more upscale style of rivals such as Penthouse and Oui. Early issues of Chic were oversized; the magazine changed to typical smaller dimensions in 1978. In 1979, Flynt went on trial for obscenity charges over eight issues of Hustler and three issues of Chic magazine.

In 1984, a Texas woman, Jeannie Braun, successfully sued Larry Flint Publications for publishing a photo of herself and "Ralph the Diving Pig" in Chic. Braun had contended that the editor had misrepresented Chic as a fashion magazine. In the 1990s, Chic, like sister publication Hustler and several competitors, began featuring graphic depictions of oral sex and sexual penetration.

Chic ceased publication in December 2001.

== Contributors ==
- G. Gordon Liddy
