= Operation Gemstone =

Watergate scandal plans by G. Gordon Liddy

In the context of the Watergate scandal, Operation Gemstone was a proposed series of clandestine or illegal acts, first outlined by G. Gordon Liddy in two separate meetings with three other individuals: then-Attorney General of the United States, John N. Mitchell, then-White House Counsel John Dean, and Jeb Magruder, an ally and former aide to H.R. Haldeman, as well as the temporary head of the Committee to Re-elect the President, pending Mitchell's resignation as Attorney General.

Operation Gemstone proposed a series of plans with each having their own code name. Operation Diamond involved kidnapping and drugging protestors who would be held in Mexico. Liddy described this operation as Nacht und Nebel, a reference to the Nazi operation. He proposed that members of organized crime be tasked with this, to which Mitchell replied "Let's not contribute any more than we have to to the coffers of organized crime". Another, Operation Turqoise, was a plan to sabotage the air conditioning at the Democratic National Convention. Operation Ruby involved planting spies in the campaigns of the Democratic primary contenders and then the eventual winner's, while Operation Coal was the clandestine funding of the candidacy of black woman Shirley Chisholm, which would help her campaign and in turn force the other candidates to pay more attention to Chisholm and criticize her. This, it was hoped, would disillusion the black community and make them less likely to vote for the eventual Democratic candidate. When Operation Coal was proposed, according to Liddy, Mitchell replied "You can forget about that. Nelson Rockefeller is already taking care of that nicely".

The first meeting occurred in the Attorney General's Washington, D.C., office at 11:00 a.m. on January 27, 1972. Liddy described in great detail both his plan to disrupt the upcoming Democratic National Convention in Miami Beach, Florida, and his plan to prevent any disruption of the upcoming Republican National Convention, then scheduled to take place in San Diego, California. Liddy's proposals would cost approximately $1 million to carry out (Around $7,001,315 in 2022). Among the various elements of Gemstone were plans to kidnap specific "radical" leaders, and others who might cause trouble at the Republican Convention, and hold them in Mexico until after the convention was over. According to all four participants of the January 27 meeting, Attorney General Mitchell declared, with some evident sarcasm, "Gordon, that's not quite what I had in mind."

John Dean described his recollections of this meeting to President Nixon on March 21, 1973, during the "Cancer on the Presidency" conversation: "So I came over and Liddy laid out a million dollar plan that was the most incredible thing I have ever laid my eyes on: all in codes, and involved black bag operations, kidnapping, providing prostitutes, uh, to weaken the opposition, bugging, uh, mugging teams. It was just an incredible thing."

The second meeting occurred one week later, on February 4, 1972, again at Mitchell's office. The participants of this meeting were the same four men as the first, although John Dean was not present for the entire meeting. Dean himself later testified that he arrived "very late" to the meeting. Liddy, Magruder, and Mitchell all disputed this claim. At the February 4 meeting, Liddy proposed a scaled-down plan that would cost $500,000 to enact (Around $3,500,657 in 2022). While less ambitious than the January 27 agenda, "Operation Gemstone" still involved several proposed criminal acts, most notably including the use of wiretaps to eavesdrop on telephone conversations involving Democratic party leaders.

Beginning in April 1973, as the Watergate scandal began to unravel, Magruder and Dean both gave public and private testimony that was very damaging to John Mitchell. For his part, Liddy remained silent until the publication of his memoir Will in April 1980. However, all four men have publicly stated that the February 4 meeting adjourned without Mitchell having expressed any approval for any of Liddy's plans. More specifically, all four participants have publicly agreed that the break-in of the Democratic National Committee's Watergate offices, generally considered the emblematic crime of the Watergate scandal, did not come up in the meeting.
