= Allister Sparks =

South African journalist

- Born: 10 March 1933; Cathcart, Cape Province, Union of South Africa
- Died: 19 September 2016 (aged 83); Johannesburg, Gauteng, South Africa
- Occupations: Journalist and editor
- Years active: 1951–2016
- Employer: Rand Daily Mail
- Known for: his editorship Rand Daily Mail during the 1970s

Allister Haddon Sparks (10 March 1933 – 19 September 2016) was a South African writer, journalist, and political commentator. He was the editor of The Rand Daily Mail when it broke Muldergate, the story of how the apartheid government secretly funded information projects.

== Early life ==
Sparks was born in Cathcart, Eastern Cape, to father Harold Sparks, a farmer, and mother Bernice Stephen. The family were descendants of the English 1820 Settlers that settled that area of the Cape. Sparks was educated at Queen's College in Queenstown.

== Career ==
Allister Sparks began his journalism career at the Queenstown Daily Representative in 1951. In 1955, he reported for the Bulawayo Chronicle in Rhodesia. He worked as an editor under Donald Woods, who was editor-in-chief at the East London Daily Dispatch from 1956 to 1957. Afterwards, he worked for the Reuters news agency in Britain. He was a journalist for The Rand Daily Mail and then a columnist in the 1960s. Sparks was later the editor of the Sunday Express. The highlight of his career was his editor position at the Rand Daily Mail. He worked for the Mail since 1967 as an editor and was let go when the board decided to target a white audience. He followed his position as an editor by working as a correspondent with top-level newspapers, including The Washington Post', The Observer (UK), and NRC Handelsblad in the Netherlands.

In 1994, he wrote an extensive piece in The New Yorker, about Nelson Mandela.

In 1995, he researched and narrated the documentary series Death of Apartheid. He died in Johannesburg on 19 September 2016 due to a heart attack following an infection.

== Publishing highlights ==
Sparks later wrote a number of critically acclaimed books on South Africa's transition from apartheid, including The Mind of South Africa (1991), Tomorrow Is Another Country (1996), and more recently Beyond the Miracle: Inside the New South Africa (University of Chicago Press, 2006). Sparks also wrote the book First Drafts (2008), as well as Tutu: The Authorised Portrait of Desmond Tutu, with a Foreword by His Holiness The Dalai Lama written with Tutu's daughter, and published in 2011 for Tutu's 80th birthday. He published his memoires, The Sword and the Pen: Six decades on the political frontier (2016), shortly before his death.

== Developing African journalism ==
Sparks founded the Institute for the Advancement of Journalism in South Africa and was its executive director from 1992 to 1997. The IAJ has focused on the education of African journalists and fostering better communication between professionals across the continent.

== Awards and honors ==
Sparks was a Nieman Fellow from 1962 to 1963.

He won the Louis M. Lyons Award while with The Observer

In 1996: The Media Institute of Southern Africa presented Allister Sparks with its Press Freedom Award. According to MISA,

It was during his tenure at the Rand Daily Mail in the late 1970s that Allister distinguished himself as a journalist of great valour and strength, willing to stick his neck out for a story even though it might have reached into the deep echelons of government.

He was the first South African journalist to receive the award.

== Works ==
- The Mind of South Africa, 1990; Random House, 2011, ISBN 9781448134557
- Tomorrow Is Another Country, 1995
- Beyond the Miracle: Inside the New South Africa University of Chicago Press, 2003, ISBN 9780226768588
- First Drafts, 2009, ISBN 9781868423460
- Tutu: The Authorised Portrait of Desmond Tutu, with a foreword by His Holiness The Dalai Lama, with photographs supplied by Tutu's daughter, 2011
- The Sword and the Pen: Six decades on the political frontier, 2016, ISBN 9781868425594
