= John Ehrlichman =

American lawyer, Watergate co-conspirator, and writer (1925–1999)

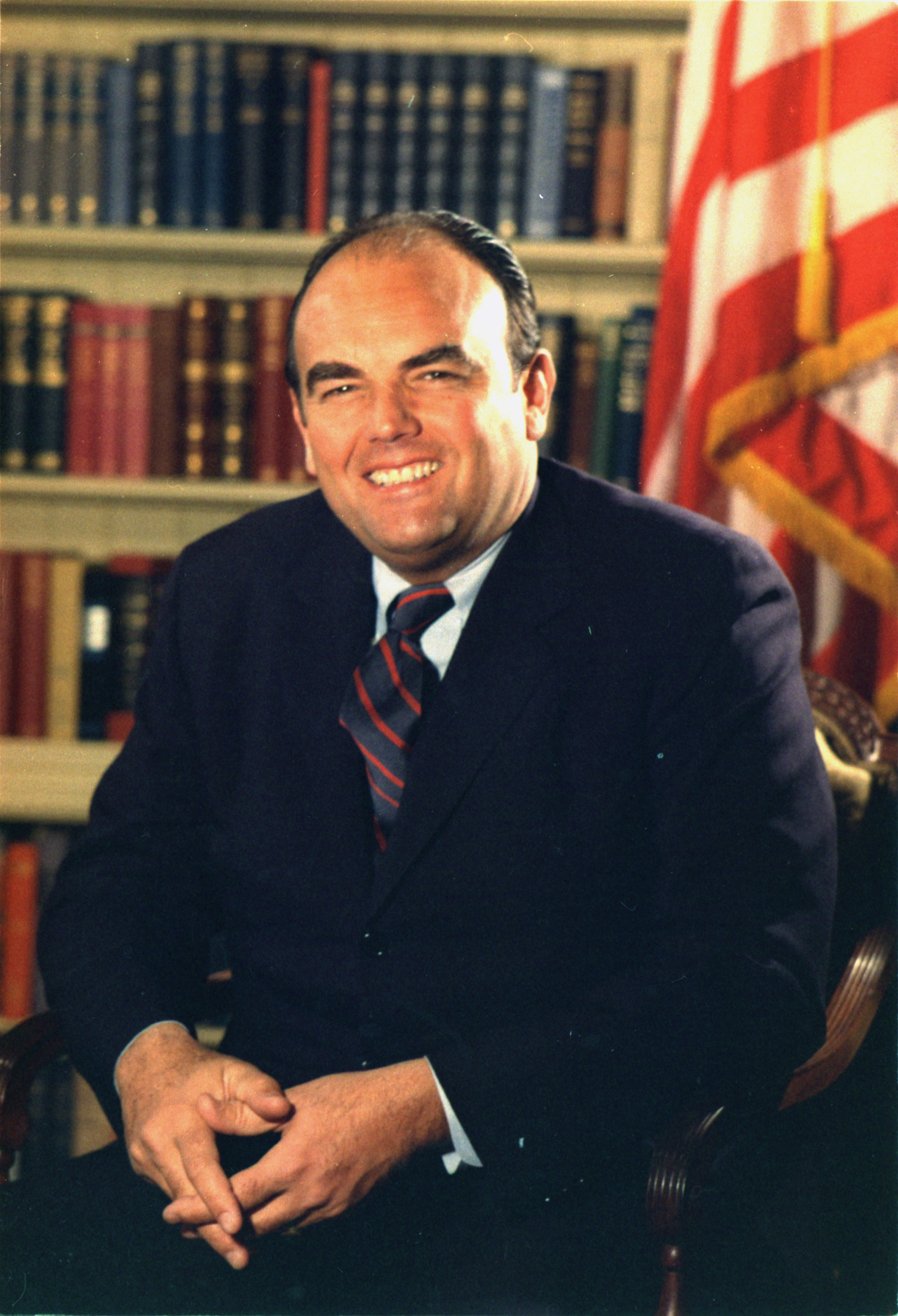
- Official portrait, 1972

White House Domestic Affairs Advisor
- In office November 4, 1969 – April 30, 1973
- President: Richard Nixon
- Preceded by: Pat Moynihan (Urban Affairs)
- Succeeded by: Melvin Laird

White House Counsel
- In office January 20, 1969 – November 4, 1969
- President: Richard Nixon
- Preceded by: Larry Temple
- Succeeded by: Chuck Colson

Personal details
- Born: John Daniel Ehrlichman; March 20, 1925 Tacoma, Washington, U.S.
- Died: February 14, 1999 (aged 73) Atlanta, Georgia, U.S.
- Party: Republican
- Spouses: Karen Hilliard; Christy Peacock
- Education: University of California, Los Angeles (BA); Stanford University (LLB)

Military service
- Allegiance: United States
- Branch/service: U.S. Army Air Forces
- Years of service: 1943–1945
- Unit: Eighth Air Force
- Battles/wars: World War II; European theater

John Daniel Ehrlichman (/ˈɜːrlɪkmən/; March 20, 1925 – February 14, 1999) was an American lawyer who served as White House Counsel and Assistant to the President for Domestic Affairs under President Richard Nixon. Ehrlichman was an important influence on Nixon's domestic policy, coaching him on issues and enlisting his support for environmental initiatives.

Ehrlichman was a key figure in events leading to the Watergate break-in and the ensuing Watergate scandal, for which he was convicted of conspiracy, obstruction of justice, and perjury, and served a year and a half in prison.

== Early life and education ==
Ehrlichman was born in Tacoma, Washington, the son of Lillian Catherine (née Danielson) and Rudolph Irwin Ehrlichman. His family practiced Christian Science (his father was a convert from Judaism). In 1931, the family moved to southern California. He was an Eagle Scout, recipient of the Distinguished Eagle Scout Award, graduated from Santa Monica High School in 1942, and attended the University of California, Los Angeles, for a year prior to his military service.

== Military service and early career ==
At age 18 in 1943, he enlisted in the U.S. Army Air Forces.

In World War II, Ehrlichman received the Distinguished Flying Cross as a lead B-24 navigator in the Eighth Air Force. Earlier in the war, his father joined the Royal Canadian Air Force as an instructor pilot in 1940 and was killed in a crash in Torbay, Newfoundland (later Canada, from 1949) on May 6, 1942.

Taking advantage of the G.I. Bill, Ehrlichman returned to UCLA and graduated in 1948 with a B.A. in political science; he graduated from Stanford Law School in 1951.

After a short time back in southern California, Ehrlichman joined a Seattle law firm, becoming a partner, practicing as a land-use lawyer, noted for his expertise in urban land use and zoning. His uncle was president of the Municipal League, and Ehrlichman was also active in the organization, supporting its efforts to clean up Lake Washington and to improve the civic infrastructure of Seattle and King County. He remained a practicing lawyer until 1969, when he entered politics full-time. His experience in environmentalism proved a major asset in his White House career.

== Political life ==
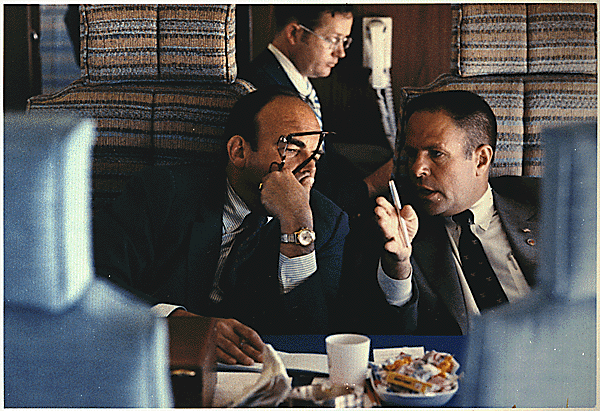
"The Berlin Wall" of Ehrlichman and Haldeman on April 27, 1973, three days before they would be asked to resign

Ehrlichman worked on Nixon's unsuccessful 1960 presidential campaign and his unsuccessful 1962 California gubernatorial election campaign. He was an advance man for Nixon's 1968 presidential campaign.

Ehrlichman became Nixon's first White House Counsel (John Dean would succeed him). Ehrlichman served as Counsel for about a year before becoming Chief Domestic Advisor. It was then that he became a member of Nixon's inner circle. He and close friend H. R. Haldeman, whom he had met at UCLA, were referred to jointly as "The Berlin Wall" by White House staffers because of their German-sounding family names and penchant for isolating Nixon from other advisors and anyone seeking an audience with him. Ehrlichman created "The Plumbers", the group at the center of the Watergate scandal, and appointed his assistant Egil Krogh to oversee its operations, focusing on stopping leaks of confidential information after the release of the Pentagon Papers in 1971.

Future US Treasury Secretary Henry Paulson was Ehrlichman's assistant in 1972 and 1973.

After the start of the Watergate investigations in 1973, Ehrlichman lobbied for an intentional delay in the confirmation of L. Patrick Gray as Director of the FBI. He argued that the confirmation hearings were deflecting media attention from Watergate and that it would be better for Gray to be left "twisting, slowly, slowly in the wind."

White House Counsel John Dean cited the "Berlin Wall" of Ehrlichman and Haldeman as one of the reasons for his growing sense of alienation in the White House. This alienation led Dean to believe he was to become the Watergate scapegoat and to his eventual cooperation with Watergate prosecutors. On April 30, 1973, Nixon fired Dean. Ehrlichman and Haldeman resigned.

=== Prison ===
Ehrlichman was defended by Andrew C. Hall during the Watergate trials, in which he was convicted of conspiracy, obstruction of justice, perjury, and other charges on January 1, 1975 (along with John N. Mitchell and Haldeman). All three men were initially sentenced to between two and a half and eight years in prison. In 1977, the sentences were commuted to one to four years. Unlike his co-defendants, Ehrlichman voluntarily entered prison before his appeals were exhausted. He was released from the Federal Correctional Institution, Safford, after serving a total of 18 months. Having been convicted of a felony, he was disbarred from the practice of law. Ehrlichman and Haldeman sought and were denied pardons by Nixon, although Nixon later regretted his decision not to grant them. Ehrlichman applied for a pardon from President Reagan in 1987.

== Post-political life ==
Following his release from prison, Ehrlichman held a number of jobs, first for a quality control firm, then writer, artist and commentator. Ehrlichman wrote several novels, including The Company, which served as the basis for the 1977 television miniseries Washington: Behind Closed Doors. He served as the executive vice president of an Atlanta hazardous materials firm. In a 1981 interview, Ehrlichman referred to Nixon as a "very pathetic figure in American history." His experiences in the Nixon administration were published in his 1982 book, Witness To Power. The book portrays Nixon in a very negative light, and is considered to be the culmination of Ehrlichman's frustration at not being pardoned by Nixon before his own 1974 resignation. Shortly before his death, Ehrlichman teamed with best-selling novelist Tom Clancy to write, produce, and co-host a three-hour Watergate documentary, John Ehrlichman: In the Eye of the Storm. The completed but never-broadcast documentary, along with associated papers and videotape elements (including an interview Ehrlichman did with Bob Woodward as part of the project), is housed at the Richard B. Russell Library for Political Research and Studies at the University of Georgia in Athens, Georgia.

In 1987, Dreyer's Grand Ice Cream hired Ehrlichman to appear in a television commercial for a light ice cream as part of a series of commercials featuring what the company called "unbelievable spokespeople for an unbelievable product." After complaints from consumers, the company quickly pulled the ad.

Ehrlichman died of complications from diabetes in Atlanta in 1999, after discontinuing dialysis treatments.

== Drug war quote ==
In 2016, an alleged quote from Ehrlichman was the lede for an anti-drug war article in Harper's Magazine by journalist Dan Baum.

“You want to know what this was really all about?” he asked with the bluntness of a man who, after public disgrace and a stretch in federal prison, had little left to protect. “The Nixon campaign in 1968, and the Nixon White House after that, had two enemies: the antiwar left and black people. You understand what I’m saying? We knew we couldn’t make it illegal to be either against the war or black, but by getting the public to associate the hippies with marijuana and blacks with heroin, and then criminalizing both heavily, we could disrupt those communities. We could arrest their leaders, raid their homes, break up their meetings, and vilify them night after night on the evening news. Did we know we were lying about the drugs? Of course we did.”

— Dan Baum, Legalize It All: How to win the war on drugs, Harper's Magazine (April 2016)

Baum states that Ehrlichman offered this quote in a 1994 interview for Baum's 1996 book, Smoke and Mirrors: The War on Drugs and the Politics of Failure, but that he did not include it in that book or otherwise publish it for 22 years "because it did not fit the narrative style" of the book.

Multiple family members of Ehrlichman (who died in 1999) challenge the veracity of the quote:

The 1994 alleged 'quote' we saw repeated in social media for the first time today does not square with what we know of our father...We do not subscribe to the alleged racist point of view that this writer now implies 22 years following the so-called interview of John and 16 years following our father's death, when dad can no longer respond.

In an expository piece focused on the quote, German Lopez does not address the family's assertion that the quote was fabricated by Baum, but suggests that Ehrlichman was either wrong or lying:

But Ehrlichman's claim is likely an oversimplification, according to historians who have studied the period and Nixon's drug policies in particular. There's no doubt Nixon was racist, and historians told me that race could have played one role in Nixon's drug war. But there are also signs that Nixon wasn't solely motivated by politics or race: For one, he personally despised drugs – to the point that it's not surprising he would want to rid the world of them. And there's evidence that Ehrlichman felt bitter and betrayed by Nixon after he spent time in prison over the Watergate scandal, so he may have lied.

More importantly, Nixon's drug policies did not focus on the kind of criminalization that Ehrlichman described. Instead, Nixon's drug war was largely a public health crusade – one that would be reshaped into the modern, punitive drug war we know today by later administrations, particularly President Ronald Reagan...

"It's certainly true that Nixon didn't like blacks and didn't like hippies," Courtwright said. "But to assign his entire drug policy to his dislike of these two groups is just ridiculous."

== In the media ==
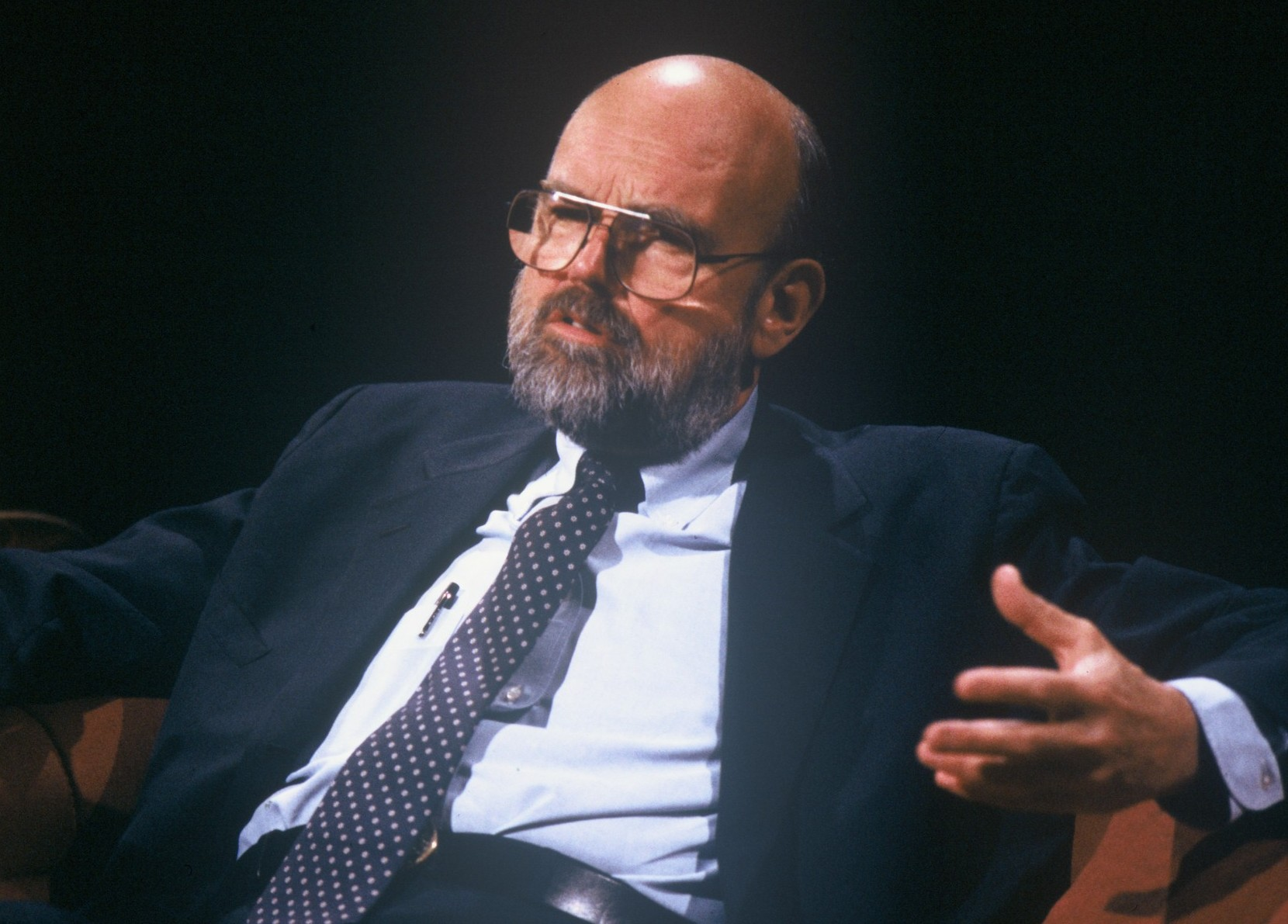
Appearing on British TV discussion programme After Dark in 1987

John Ehrlichman was portrayed by J. T. Walsh in the film Nixon, and by Wayne Péré in Mark Felt: The Man Who Brought Down the White House.

== Fiction works ==
- The Company (1976)
- The Whole Truth (1979)
- The China Card (1986)

== Memoir ==
- Witness to Power: The Nixon Years (1982)

== See also ==
- Modified limited hangout, a phrase Ehrlichman used in the Watergate tapes
- Operation Sandwedge
- Presidency of Richard Nixon

Legal offices
Preceded by Larry Temple	White House Counsel; 1969	Succeeded by Chuck Colson
Political offices
Preceded by Pat Moynihan as White House Urban Affairs Advisor	White House Domestic Affairs Advisor; 1969–1973	Succeeded by Melvin Laird
