= Brook Lapping =

British TV and radio production company

Brook Lapping Productions is a British TV and radio production company. Based in London, Brook Lapping is a subsidiary of Ten Alps.

The company is the result of a 1997 merger of Brook Associates (founded in 1982), and Brian Lapping Associates.

== Filmography ==
- Inside Obama's White House (2016) (BBC)
- The Iraq War (2013)
- Putin, Russia & The West (2011)
- Iran and the West (2009) (BBC)
- Attack on the Pentagon (2008) (Discovery)
- Revealed: The Great Olympic Drug Scandal (2007) (Five)
- Ocean of Fear: Worst Shark Attack Ever (2007) (Discovery)
- The Rise and Fall of Tony Blair (2007) (Channel 4)
- Jackie Magazine: A Girl's Best Friend (2007)
- Blog Wars (2006)
- Phantom of the Opera: Behind the Mask (2006)
- Bom Bali (2006)
- Surviving Katrina (2006)
- Live 8: A Bittersweet Symphony (2005)
- Israel and the Arabs: Elusive Peace (2005)
- Catherine the Great (2005)
- The Flight That Fought Back (2005)
- "Geldof in Africa" (2005)
- Gridlock (2005)
- How We Fell for Europe (2005)
- Live Aid Remembered (2005)
- Spy Secrets (2004)
- Ace in the Hole (2004)
- Adolf Eichmann - Begegnungen mit einem Mörder (2003)
- "Breast Health: New Hope" (2001)
- Endgame in Ireland (2001)
- "Queen Victoria's Empire" (2001)
- Finest Hour: The Battle of Britain (2000)
- Hostage (1999)
- The Vietnam War: A Descent Into Hell (1999)

== See also ==
- Brian Lapping
- Norma Percy
