= The Death of Yugoslavia =

BBC documentary series

- Narrated by: Robin Ellis (BBC version); Christiane Amanpour (Discovery Channel version)
- Music by: Debbie Wiseman
- Country of origin: United Kingdom
- Original languages: English, Serbo-Croatian, Macedonian, Slovene, Albanian, Italian, German, French, Russian, Spanish
- No. of series: 1
- No. of episodes: 6

Production
- Executive producers: Brian Lapping; Nicholas Fraser
- Producer: Norma Percy
- Cinematography: Robert Andrejas; Ray Brislin; François Paumard; Markan Radeljić; Alexandar Stipić
- Editor: Dawn Griffiths
- Running time: 50 minutes
- Production company: Brian Lapping Associates

Original release
- Network: BBC2
- Release: 3 September 1995 – 6 June 1996

The Death of Yugoslavia (broadcast as Yugoslavia: Death of a Nation in the US) is a BBC documentary series first broadcast in September and October 1995, and returning in June 1996. It is also the title of a BBC book by Allan Little and Laura Silber that accompanies the series. It chronicles the breakup of Yugoslavia, the subsequent wars and the signing of the final peace accords. It uses a combination of archived footage interspersed with interviews with most of the main players in the conflict, including Slobodan Milošević, Radovan Karadžić, Franjo Tuđman and Alija Izetbegović, as well as members of the international political community, who were active in the various peace initiatives.

The series was awarded a BAFTA Award in 1996 for Best Factual Series. It also won the 1995 Peabody Award and the 1997 Gold Baton at the Alfred I. duPont–Columbia University Awards. Interviews for the series have been used by ICTY in war crimes prosecutions.

All the papers relating to the documentary series, including the full transcripts of the interviews, are lodged at the Liddell Hart Centre for Military Archives at King's College, University of London.

== Episodes ==
| Number | Title | Originally broadcast | Overview |
|---|---|---|---|
| 1 | Enter Nationalism | 3 September 1995 | After the death of Josip Broz Tito, rising nationalism grips Yugoslavia. This is exacerbated after Slobodan Milošević takes power in Serbia and turns against the Kosovar Albanians. |
| 2 | The Road to War | 10 September 1995 | In April 1990, Croatia holds its first free parliamentary election. Ethnic Serbs in Croatia feel threatened by the nationalist tone of Croatia's newly elected President Franjo Tuđman and they begin a Log Revolution in August 1990. On 19 May 1991, Croatia holds an independence referendum, which is approved by a wide majority. The Battle of Vukovar of August 1991 is the first major battle in the Croatian War of Independence. |
| 3 | Wars of Independence | 17 September 1995 | Slovenia and Croatia soon declare their independence and ask for international recognition. But Belgrade (the capital of both Serbia and Yugoslavia) does not see it this way because this means the collapse of Yugoslavia. Under Milošević's orders, the Yugoslav People's Army (JNA) invades Croatia in an attempt to prevent their secession from Yugoslavia. An attempt by the JNA to regain control of Slovenia fails. |
| 4 | The Gates of Hell | 24 September 1995 | After the war between Yugoslavia and Croatia ends with the signing of an agreement, Serbia involves itself in Bosnia where a lot is at stake. Here begins the longest and the most tragic part of the conflict. |
| 5 | A Safe Area | 1 October 1995 | As the situation in Bosnia worsens, there is further conflict between the Serb and Bosnian forces. There is increasing UN involvement and NATO begins to step in. The Bosnians and Croats reach an agreement mediated by the UN whilst another UN agreement falls through, despite being signed by all parties. The suffering and persecution of Bosnian Muslims by Serb forces are featured. |
| 6 | Pax Americana | 6 June 1996 | Croatia launches Operation Storm and recaptures most of the territory of the self-proclaimed Republic of Serbian Krajina, which leads to a mass exodus of Serbs from Croatia. Bosnian Serb forces commit the Srebrenica and Markale massacres. In response, NATO launches Operation Deliberate Force and bombs the positions of Bosnian Serb forces, which forces the Bosnian Serbs to return to negotiations. US brokers the Dayton Agreement which effectively ends the Bosnian war. |

== Edits ==
The series was later re-edited and released in three parts:

1. "Enter Milošević"
2. "The Croats Strike Back"
3. "The Struggle for Bosnia"

In another edit, it was broadcast as a feature-length single documentary.

== Interviewees ==
- Diego Arria (born 1938), former President of the United Nations Security Council
- Blagoje Adžić (1932–2012), former Minister of Defence of Yugoslavia
- Milan Aksentijević (born 1935), former General of JNA forces in Bosnia, Croatia and Slovenia
- Milan Babić (1956–2006), former President of the Republic of Serbian Krajina
- Igor Bavčar (born 1955), Slovenian politician
- Mate Boban (1940–1997), former President of the Croat Republic of Herceg-Bosnia
- Bogić Bogićević (born 1953), former Yugoslav representative for SR Bosnia and Herzegovina
- Dragoslav Bokan (born 1961), Serbian film director and writer
- Josip Boljkovac (1920–2014), former Minister of Interior of Croatia
- Momir Bulatović (1956–2019), former President of SR Montenegro
- Lord Carrington (1919–2018), UN envoy
- Warren Christopher (1925–2011), United States Secretary of State
- Vitaly Churkin (1952–2017), Russian diplomat
- Dobrica Ćosić (1921-2014), Yugoslav and Serbian politician
- Mile Dedaković (born 1951), Croatian Army colonel
- Slavko Degoricija, Croatian politician
- Gianni De Michelis (1940–2019), former Minister of Foreign Affairs of Italy
- Jovan Divjak (1937–2021), Bosnian Serb general in the Bosnian Army
- Rasim Delić (1949–2010), chief of staff of the Bosnian army
- Raif Dizdarević (1926–2026), former President of Yugoslavia
- Murat Efendić, Bosnian politician
- Peter Galbraith (born 1950), US Ambassador to Croatia
- Ejup Ganić (born 1946), Bosnian politician
- Hans-Dietrich Genscher (1927–2016), former Minister of Foreign Affairs of Germany
- Mate Granić (born 1947), Minister of Foreign Affairs of Croatia
- Petar Gračanin (1923–2004), former Secretary of Interior of Yugoslavia
- Mustafa Hajrulahović (1957–1998), general in the Bosnian Army
- Sefer Halilović (born 1952), former commander of the Bosnian Army
- David Hannay (born 1935), British diplomat
- Christopher R. Hill (born 1952), American diplomat
- Richard Holbrooke (1941–2010), Assistant Secretary US State Department
- Larry Hollingworth, head of UNHCR operations in Bosnia
- Douglas Hurd (born 1930), Foreign Secretary of UK
- Alija Izetbegović (1925–2003), President of the Republic of Bosnia
- Janez Janša, Slovenian politician
- Žarko Jokanović, Serbian writer
- Borisav Jović (1958–2021), former President of the Presidency of Yugoslavia
- Perica Jurić, Croatian politician
- Radovan Karadžić (born 1945), former President of Republika Srpska
- Donald Kerrick, Lieutenant General in US Army
- Nikola Koljević (1936–1997), Vice President of Republika Srpska
- Branko Kostić (1939–2020), former President of the Presidency of Yugoslavia
- Momčilo Krajišnik (1945–2020), Speaker of the National Assembly of Republika Srpska
- Milan Kučan (born 1941), former President of Slovenia
- Milutin Kukanjac (1935–2002), former General of JNA forces in Bosnia
- Zlatko Lagumdžija (born 1955), Deputy Prime Minister of the Republic of Bosnia and Herzegovina
- Anthony Lake (born 1939), United States National Security Advisor
- Lewis MacKenzie (born 1940), chief of staff of the United Nations peacekeeping force in former Yugoslavia
- Branko Mamula (1921–2021), former Minister of Defence of Yugoslavia
- Milan Martić (born 1954), former President of the Republic of Serbian Krajina
- Mirjana Marković (1942–2019), wife of Slobodan Milošević
- José María Mendiluce (1951–2015), UN representative in Bosnia
- Stjepan Mesić (born 1934), Croatian politician
- Slobodan Milošević (1941–2006), former FR Yugoslavia president
- Dušan Mitević (1938–2003), Serbian journalist
- Philippe Morillon (1936–2026), UNPROFOR general
- Naser Orić (born 1967), commander of the Bosniak forces in Srebrenica
- David Owen (born 1938), British diplomat
- Života Panić (1933–2003), former Minister of Defence of Yugoslavia
- Rosemary Pauli, US delegate during Dayton negotiations
- Pavle (1914–2009), patriarch of the Serbian Orthodox Church
- Ilijaz Pilav, Srebrenica survivor, town council member
- Biljana Plavšić (1930–2026), President of Republika Srpska
- Slobodan Praljak (1945–2017), Bosnian Croat general
- Armin Pohara, Bosnian actor
- Ivica Račan (1944–2007), Croatian politician
- Andrija Rašeta, JNA general
- Charles Redman (born 1943), American diplomat
- Jadranka, widow of Josip Reihl-Kir
- Malcolm Rifkind (born 1946), UK Foreign Secretary
- Michael Rose (born 1940), former Commander of UNPROFOR in Bosnia
- Zulfo Salihović, Bosnian politician
- Vojislav Šešelj (born 1954), Serbian politician and paramilitary leader
- Haris Silajdžić (born 1945), Prime Minister of Bosnia
- Miroslav Šolević, Serb nationalist leader in Kosovo
- Martin Špegelj (1927–2014), former Minister of Defence of Croatia
- Ivan Stambolić (1936–2000), former President of Serbia
- Shashi Tharoor (born 1956), head of peacekeeping operations in former Yugoslavia
- Franjo Tuđman (1922–1999), President of Croatia
- Vasil Tupurkovski (born 1951), former Member of the Presidency of Yugoslavia for SR Macedonia
- Miloš Vasić, Serbian journalist
- Aleksandar Vasiljević (born 1938), head of the Counterintelligence Service of Yugoslavia
- Alexander Vershbow (born 1952), American diplomat
- Azem Vllasi (born 1948), Kosovo Albanian politician
- Michael Williams (1949–2017), British diplomat
- Franci Zavrl, Slovenian journalist
- Warren Zimmermann (1934–2004), last US ambassador to SFR Yugoslavia
