= China's Wings =

Book by Gregory Crouch

China's Wings: War, Intrigue, Romance and Adventure in the Middle Kingdom during the Golden Age of Flight
- First Edition
- Author: Gregory Crouch
- Language: English
- Publisher: Bantam Books (USA)
- Publication date: 2012
- Publication place: United States
- Media type: Hardback
- ISBN: 978-0553804270

China's Wings: War, Intrigue, Romance and Adventure in the Middle Kingdom during the Golden Age of Flight is a 2012 book by Gregory Crouch, published by Bantam Books. The book discusses the history of the China National Aviation Corporation (CNAC) and is focused on William Langhorne Bond as the central character. Harry Eagar of the Maui News stated that "is largely a biography of Bond." The book also describes Moon Fun Chin, a Chinese-American who rose from peasant roots, to become a lead CNAC pilot and finally to owning his own airline. Among other events, the book discusses the establishment of the first airline in China, the Second Sino-Japanese War, "The Hump" airlift, and the 1938 Kweilin incident. The book ends after the 1949 Communist takeover.

== Background ==
The author used interviews with surviving CNAC staff, including Moon Fun Chin; Bond's letters, memoirs, and reports; and archival materials made by CNAC pilots. Richard R. Muller, who reviewed the book for World War II magazine, stated that these sources, including Bond's recollection of the evacuation of Hong Kong, were "impeccable".

== Reception ==
Colleen Mondor of Booklist stated that it was "thoroughly researched" and "readable".

Kirkus Reviews stated that China's Wings was "recondite but dramatically rendered and obsessively researched."

Josh McMahon of The Star-Ledger stated that the book is "an interesting read" and that it would be a good companion to In the Garden of Beasts by Erik Larson, and Unbroken by Laura Hillenbrand though "Crouch's storytelling skills aren't at the level of Hillenbrand and Larson".

Muller stated that the book was a "compelling narrative" and "an exceedingly appealing combination of adventure story, aviation and military history, and earthy travelogue."
