= China National Aviation Flight 31 =

1946 aviation accident in China

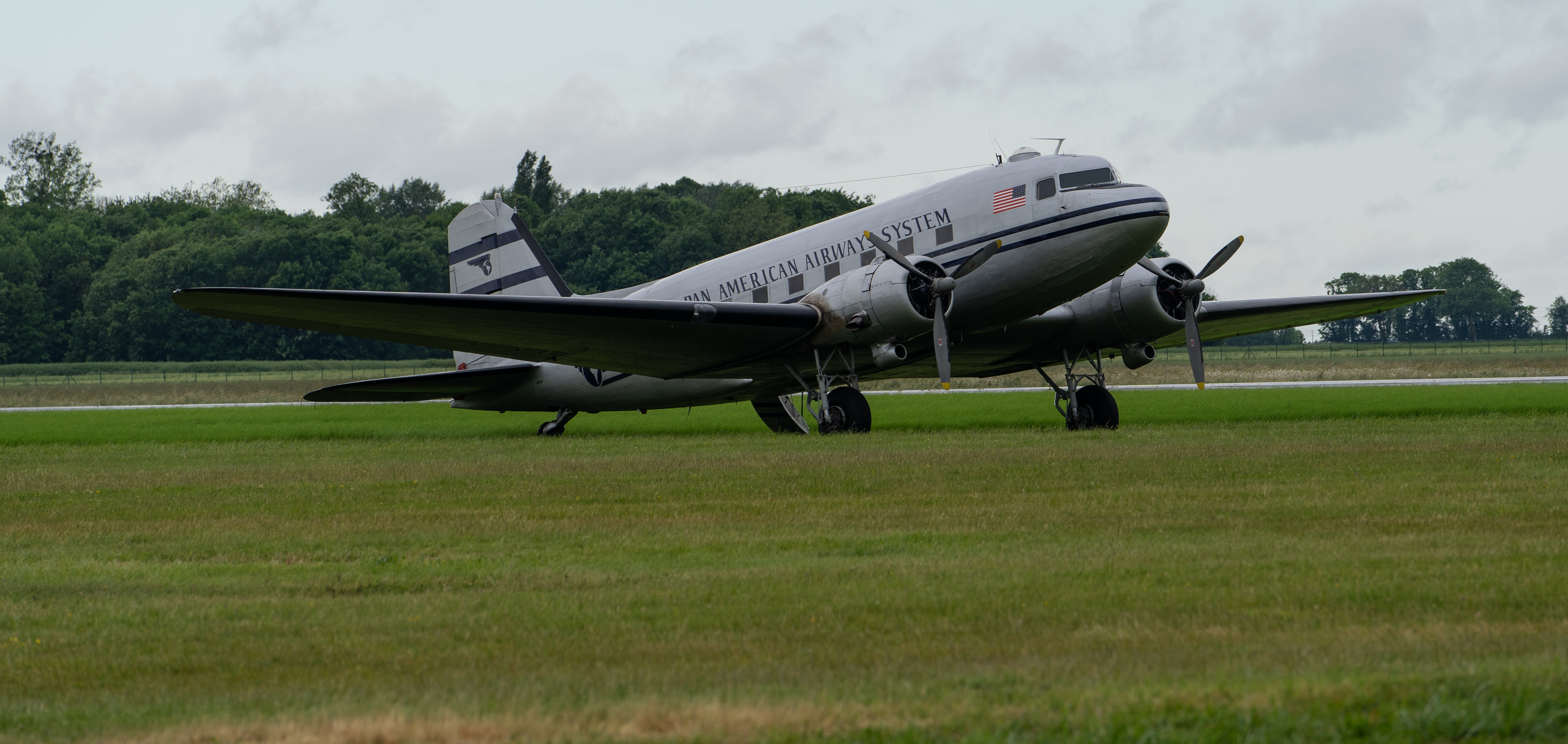
- A Douglas C-47, similar to the one involved

Occurrence
- Date: 14 December 1946
- Summary: Controlled flight into terrain
- Site: Changxing County (Lijiaxiang, Longhua Temple Village), Zhejiang, Republic of China

Aircraft
- Aircraft type: Douglas C-47 Skytrain
- Operator: China National Aviation Corporation
- Flight origin: Beiping Nanyuan Airport
- Stopover: Nanjing Ming Palace Airport
- Destination: Shanghai Longhua Airport
- Passengers: 2
- Crew: 4
- Fatalities: 6
- Survivors: 0

The China National Aviation Flight 31 was a Chinese domestic flight from Beiping Nanyuan Airport to Shanghai Longhua Airport operated by China National Aviation Corporation on 14 December 1946. It crashed into a mountain, killing all four crew members and two passengers on board in Zhejiang, Changxing County, Lijiaxiang. Among the dead were dental expert dentistry specialist Dai Tianfang and National Government Executive Yuan official Xue Jingshou.

The crash drew attention due to the 500 kilogram of banknotes on board, valued at 1.2 billion Chinese fabi, belonging to the Bank of China. Following the crash, local villagers looted much of the scattered money, and only a portion was later recovered. Despite the large nominal loss, the impact was mitigated by the severe hyperinflation at the time.

This flight was just before the other three Chinese December accidents names as the Black Christmas disaster.

== Flight ==
On 13 December 1946, Flight 31 of the China National Aviation Corporation departed from Beiping bound for Shanghai, operated by a C-47 transport aircraft. The crew consisted of captain Ma Faxiang, co-pilot Hou Ande, radio operator Zhong De, and mechanic Zhang Shudong. The aircraft had a cargo of 500 kilogram of banknotes on board, valued at 1.2 billion Chinese fabi, belonging to the Bank of China. Due to poor weather conditions, the aircraft stopped overnight at Nanjing Ming Palace Airport. At approximately 14:00 on 14 December, the aircraft departed Nanjing for Shanghai, but lost contact about 200 km from Nanjing.

At around 16:00, the aircraft crashed into a mountain near Lijiaxiang, Changxing County.

There were only two passengers on board:

- Dai Tianfang, deputy dean of the School of Dentistry at West China University (now part of West China Medical Center of Sichuan University), and editor of China's first dental journal. He was a native of Neijiang, Sichuan, and had studied public dental health in the United States before returning to China.
- Xue Jingshou, an Executive Yuan official and president of the International Studies Society at National Chiao Tung University. A native of Xiangshan, Guangdong, he graduated from its civil engineering school and studied abroad at the University of California. He was traveling from the United Kingdom to Shanghai for his engagement.

== Aftermath ==
=== Rescue and response ===
After the aircraft lost contact, the Shanghai headquarters of the China National Aviation Corporation initiated search operations, dispatching two aircraft to search around Suzhou and Wuxi, but found no trace. The aircraft was missing for several days.

The crash site was first discovered by local residents living in huts on the southern slope of the mountain, who initially looted valuables from the wreckage. By dawn on 15 December, news of the crash had spread in Lijiaxiang.

Eyewitnesses described the scene: "Banknotes were scattered everywhere due to the violent impact, covering an area of about two mu, piled knee-deep. Nearby, a heap of burned banknotes about two chi wide and one chi high could be seen". On 16 December, the airline received a telegram from the Changxing County government confirming the crash and total fatalities. Personnel were dispatched to the site by air and rail. The victims' remains were transported to Shanghai for burial, and compensation was issued: 1 million Chinese fabi to each passenger's family and US$10,000 to each crew member's family.

=== Recovery of banknotes ===
Following the crash, officials from the Bank of China traveled from Shanghai Longhua Airport to Changxing County to handle recovery efforts, while other personnel traveled via Suzhou. The bank coordinated with local authorities to retrieve the notes. If full recovery proved impossible, recovered notes would be transported to Shanghai and insurance claims filed for the remainder.

Emergency measures included, requiring anyone holding banknotes with matching serial numbers and suspicious marks (water, burn, oil, or odor) to register them at the Huzhou branch of the Bank of China; offering a reward of 30% of the note's value for returned currency within ten days and publishing serial numbers of the lost banknotes and invalidating them to prevent circulation.

On 10 January 1947, remaining banknotes were collected and sealed under supervision of regional authorities and the local court, then transported to Shanghai. On 14 January, a public inspection revealed that 250 million fabi remained intact, while 480,000 fabi were burned and destroyed. According to bank officials, over 200 million fabi were recovered, 200 million were destroyed, about 300 million were looted by villagers, and roughly 400 million were stolen or otherwise lost. The shipment had been fully insured with China Taiping Insurance Holdings and other Chinese insurers, which further reinsured the risk with a foreign insurance company in Shanghai. Despite the large nominal loss, the impact was mitigated by the severe hyperinflation at the time.

=== Other accidents ===
This flight was just before the other three Chinese December accidents names as the Black Christmas disaster, with multiple the Douglas aircraft.
