= Flight 140 =

Flight 140 may refer to:

- China Airlines Flight 140, crashed on 26 April 1994
- CNAC Flight 140, crashed on 25 December 1946
