= Aviation in Arkansas =

- Aviation in the United States
- Arkansas State Flag

Airports
- Commercial – primary: 4
- Commercial – non-primary: 2
- General aviation: 71
- Other public-use airports: 22
- Military and other airports: 3

First flight
- 1870 - Hot air balloon

The first aeronautical event in Arkansas was the flight of a balloon around 1870 in Yell county. The first heavier than air flight was by James C. “Bud” Mars on 21 May 1910.

== Events ==
- July 1930, Walter Herschel Beech, founder of Beechcraft has an offer rejected to build a factory in Arkansas City, Arkansas, instead building the company in Wichita, Kansas.
- September 19, 1980, a major mishap occurred after a socket rolled off a platform and punctured a Titan II Stage I fuel tank, subsequently causing the entire silo to explode, killing an Air Force airman, SrA David Livingston, and destroying the silo near Damascus, Arkansas. A "B" grade television movie portrays this event, "Disaster at Silo 7".
- 1 April 1981 Arkansas native, J. Lynn Helms is appointed as director of the FAA, serving through the 1981 Controller strike

== Aircraft Manufacturers ==
- Dassault Aviation maintains a final assembly facility in Little Rock, Arkansas for its Falcon series of jets.

== Airports ==
- List of Airports in Arkansas

== Organizations ==
- The Arkansas Aerospace Alliance is part of the Arkansas Economic Development Commission.

== Government and Military ==
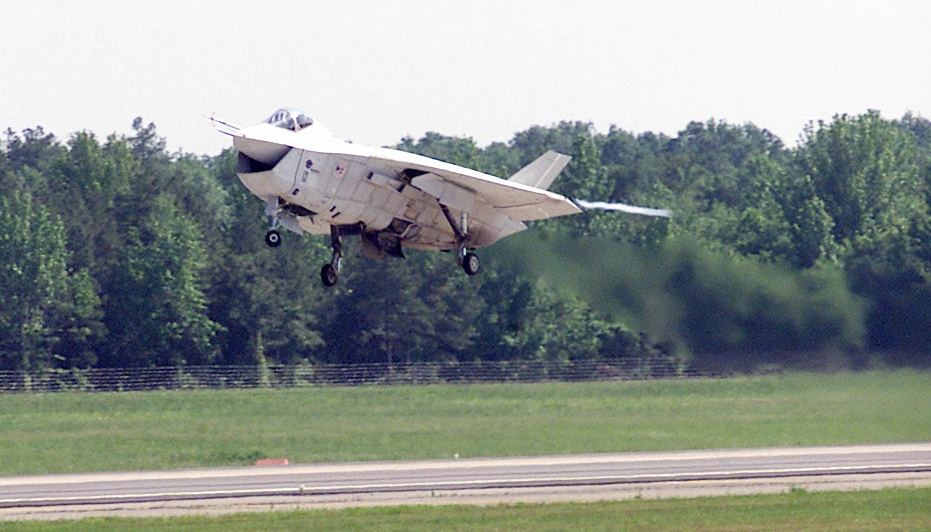
The Boeing X-32B taking off from Little Rock Air Force Base, Arkansas

- All flight operations in Arkansas are conducted within FAA oversight.
- The Arkansas Department of Aeronautics was founded in 1966.

== Museums ==
- Arkansas Air & Military Museum, Fayetteville, Arkansas
- Fort Smith Air Museum, Fort Smith, Arkansas
