= China National Aviation Corporation Flight 81 =

September 1946 Chinese aircraft crash

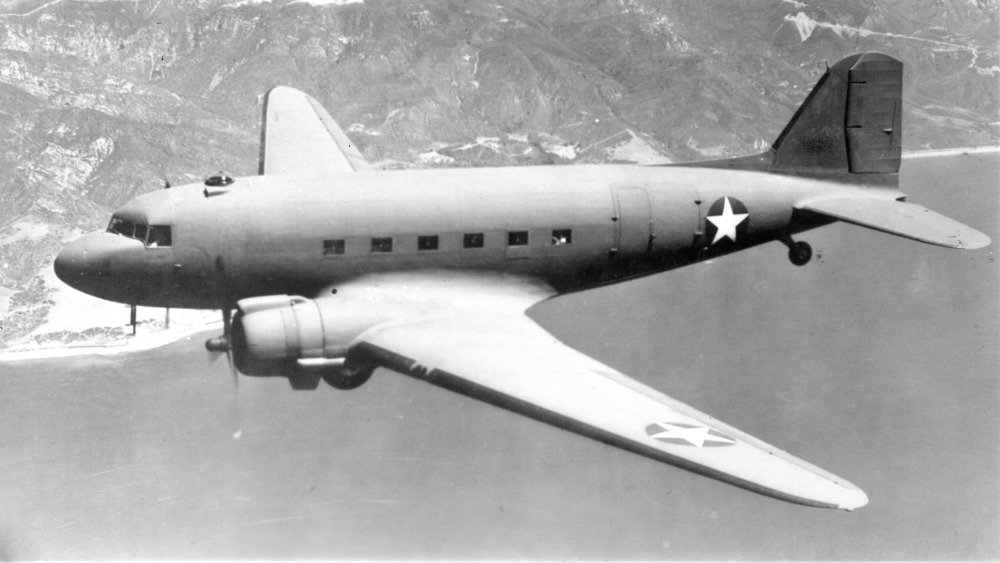
- A Douglas C-47 Skytrain similar to the incident aircraft

Occurrence
- Date: 20 September 1946
- Summary: Controlled flight into terrain
- Site: Luoji Shan, Xichang, Xikang, Republic of China

Aircraft
- Aircraft type: Douglas C-47 Skytrain
- Operator: China National Aviation Corporation
- Flight origin: Xiaomiao Airport, Xichang, Xikang, Republic of China
- Stopover: Wujiaba Airport, Kunming, Yunnan, Republic of China
- Destination: San Hu Pa Airfield, Chongqing, Republic of China
- Passengers: 28
- Crew: 3
- Fatalities: 31
- Survivors: 0

China National Aviation Corporation Flight 81 was a fatal aviation accident that occurred on 20 September 1946 near Xichang in Xikang Province, China operated by China National Aviation Corporation (CNAC). The aircraft lost contact shortly after takeoff and was over three weeks later confirmed to have crashed into the Luoji Shan Mountains.

All 28 passengers and 3 crew members on board were killed. The accident site was located in a Lisu ethnic minority area. Their bodies and personal belongings were looted by local residents. It was hard to locate, so China Airlines offered a reward for help. However, the local people deliberately misled and obstructed the claim including attacking search teams, and the plane crashed was not confirmed until October 12.

== Flight details ==
On 20 September 1946 at 13:45, Flight 81, operated by China National Aviation Corporation, departed from Xichang en route to Kunming, with a scheduled continuation to Chongqing. At 14:07, about twenty minutes after departure, the communication with the aircraft was lost due to bad weather conditions.

=== Passengers and crew ===
There were 28 passengers on board, including Wang Qingnong, a reporter from the Central News Agency. The crew consisted of American Captain Andrew W. Longbotham, First Officer Tuan Paotai (段保泰), radio operator Liang Chunlin (梁春霖) and flight attendant Huang Li (黄利).

== Search and rescue missions ==
On 20 September, after the aircraft went missing,, CNAC dispatched two aircraft to conduct search flights over the Xichang area, while local authorities under Commander He Guoguang of the Xichang Garrison also organized ground search efforts. On 24 September, reports claimed that wreckage had been found near Tianbao Mountain, but this was later proven false. Poor weather conditions hampered search operations, and one of the search aircraft became stuck in mud during landing.

Because the crash site was located in a region inhabited by the Lisu people, access for outsiders was difficult. CNAC offered rewards and distributed leaflets to gather information from local residents.

On 26 September, reports emerged that the aircraft had made an emergency landing in Puge County and that the passengers were alive but short of food. However, this report was later determined to be false and motivated by reward claims. Local resistance also obstructed search efforts, including local residents attackeing the search teams.

Eventually, pilot Robert W. Pottschmidt located the wreckage in the Luoji Shan Mountains, approximately 30 kilometers from Xichang. On 12 October, authorities officially confirmed that Flight 81 had crashed into a mountain, killing all on board. The aircraft did not catch fire, as the throttle was closed during impact, and most victims died from the force of the crash. Personal belongings, including silver valued at approximately $4,000, were looted by local residents.
