= Langhorne Bond =

U.S. government administrator (1937–2022)

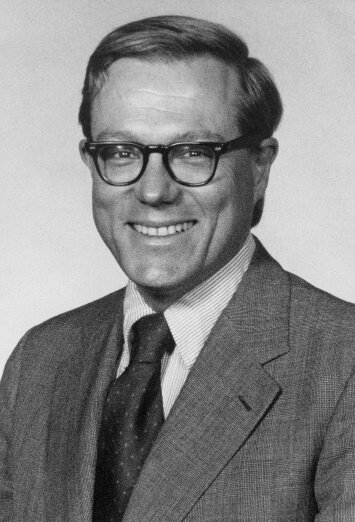

7th Administrator of the Federal Aviation Administration
- In office May 4, 1977 – January 20, 1981
- President: Jimmy Carter
- Preceded by: John L. McLucas
- Succeeded by: J. Lynn Helms

Personal details
- Born: Langhorne McCook Bond; March 11, 1937 Shanghai, China
- Died: January 29, 2022 (aged 84)
- Relations: William Langhorne Bond (father)
- Education: Queen's College, London; McGill University; University of Virginia School of Law

Langhorne McCook Bond (March 11, 1937 - January 29, 2022) was the Administrator of the U.S. Federal Aviation Administration from 1977 to 1981 under President Jimmy Carter. He is the son of William Langhorne Bond.

Bond died on January 29, 2022, aged 84.

== Biography ==
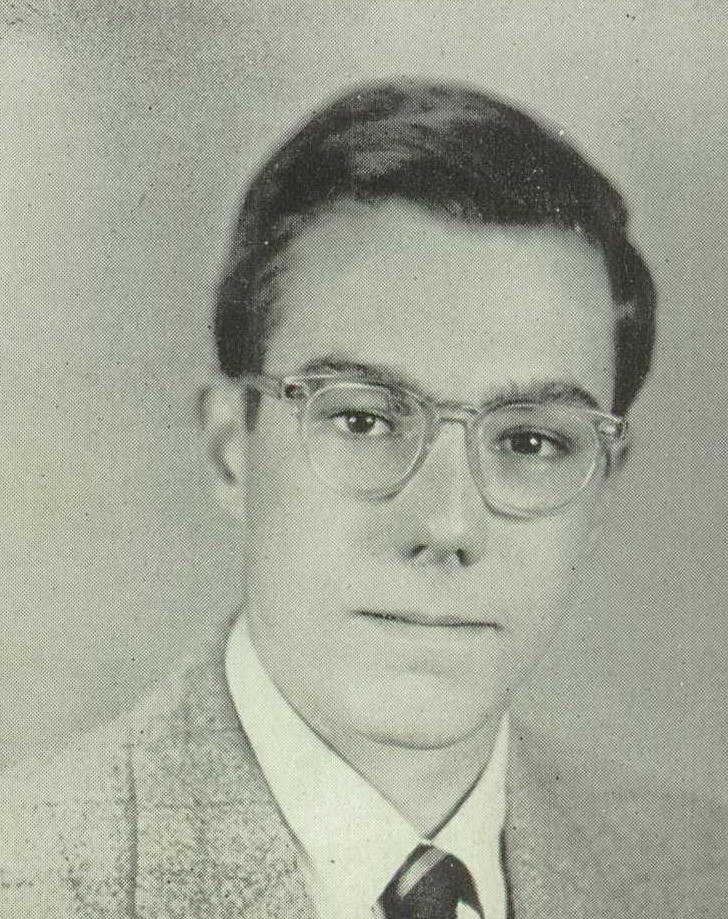
Langhorne Bond at Episcopal High School, 1955

Bond was born in Shanghai, China.

In 1955, he graduated from Episcopal High School in Alexandria, Virginia in the same class as engineer and defense contractor Ted Mollegen. He and Mollegen were a year behind John McCain in high school.

Bond holds degrees from Queen's College, London, McGill University and a law degree from the University of Virginia where he was a brother of The Sigma Phi Society.

== Career ==
He was also Secretary of the Illinois Department of Transportation, Chief of Staff for the U.S. Department of Transportation Secretary Alan S. Boyd and president of the American Association of State Highway and Transportation Officials (AASHTO).

== Awards and recognition ==
- Glen A. Gilbert Memorial Award, Air Traffic Control Association in recognition of his contributions to aviation safety (1999)

Government offices
Preceded by John L. McLucas	Administrator of the Federal Aviation Administration; 1977–1981	Succeeded by J. Lynn Helms
