= China National Aviation Corporation =

Chinese airline until 1949

- Roundel of CNAC (1942–1949)
- Type: State-owned enterprise
- Industry: Aviation
- Founded: August 1, 1930
- Defunct: May 1952
- Fate: Nationalized by the communist government; Some assets were relocated to Taiwan by nationalist government
- Successor: China National Aviation Corporation Hong Kong branch; People's Aviation Company of China
- Headquarters: Shanghai Municipality

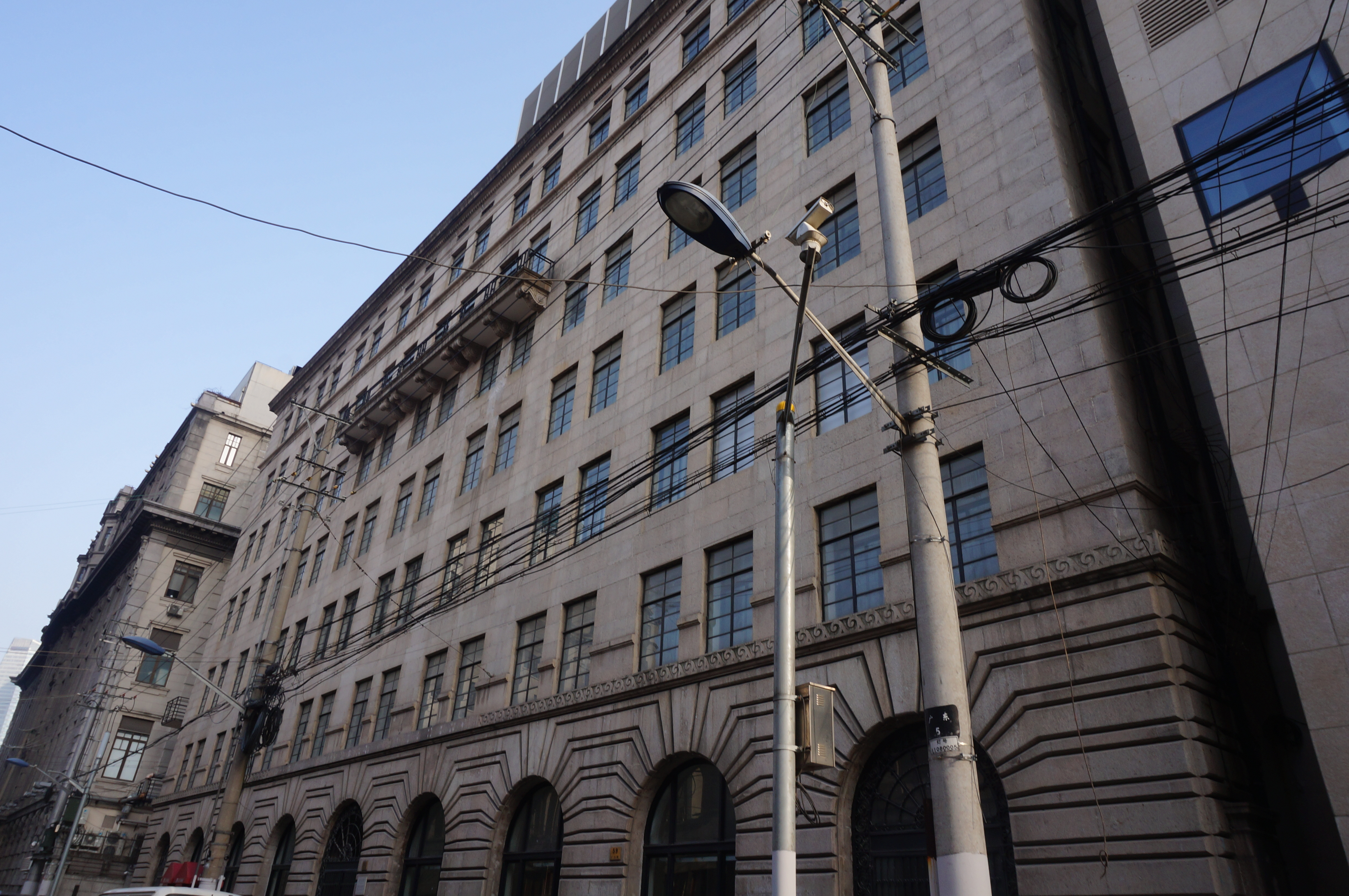
The former Robert Dollar Building, 51, Canton Road, Shanghai - Airline headquarters

The China National Aviation Corporation (Chinese: 中國航空公司) was a Chinese airline which was nationalized after the Chinese Communist Party took control in 1949, and merged into the People's Aviation Company of China (中國人民航空公司) in 1952. It was a major airline under the Nationalist government of China until the 90s.

It was headquartered in Shanghai as of 1938.

== History ==
On 5 April 1929 the Executive Yuan of the Nationalist government of China based in Nanjing established the Chinese National Aviation Corporation, a state owned company with an authorized capital of ten million yuan. Sun Fo, Minister of Railways and son of Sun Yat Sen served as its first chairman although the real power lay with the Minister of Communications, Wang Boqun.

Two weeks later on 17 April, the Nationalists entered into a service contract with an American firm, Aviation Exploration Inc which was to establish air routes between a few of the major treaty ports and manage all operations. Aviation Exploration Inc was a personal holding company of the U.S. aviation magnate Clement Melville Keys who at the same time was the president of Curtiss-Wright and a few other aviation firms. In June 1929, Keys set up China Airways Federal to manage the new airmail routes between Canton, Shanghai and Hankou.

This new Sino-American venture faced acute resistance from military factions in South China: warlords had their own small air forces which had ambitions to earn income from airmail service between the treaty ports. Even more ominous was the opposition from Wang Po-chun the Minister of Communications; in July 1929, he went ahead and set up an airmail service, Shanghai-Chengtu Airways, owned entirely by his ministry. Wang imported Stinson planes and competed with China Airways Federal on the Shanghai-Hankou route. He became in effect the father of China's civil aviation.

Despite all the odds, on 21 October 1929, China Airways Federal launched the airmail and passenger service with an inaugural flight from Shanghai to Hankou. It continued to face overwhelming political and financial difficulties, not least from the Ministry of Communications which not only collected airmail revenue from its own service but from that of China Airways Federal.

By the start of 1930 China Airways Federal was at the point of bankruptcy and threatened to stop operations altogether unless the Ministry of Communications released its revenue. An old China hand named Max Polin managed to broker a new deal between China Airways Federal and the Ministry of Communication. On 8 July, the two rival airmail operators merged into a reconfigured China National Aviation Corporation, which thereafter was better known by its acronym, CNAC. The Chinese government had a 55 percent share and Keys' interests had a 45 percent share in CNAC. The Keys share in CNAC wound up in Intercontinent Aviation, another holding company that he had established in 1929 to handle foreign airline investments; by that stage Intercontinent itself had become part of North American Aviation, another firm founded by Keys in 1928. From 1931 until 1948 William Langhorne Bond was operations manager and vice-president of China National Aviation Corporation

By 1933, Keys had retired under a cloud of scandal and near bankruptcy. Thomas Morgan was his successor as the head of Curtiss-Wright which through cross holdings ultimately controlled both North American and Intercontinent. After a series of disastrous accidents and disagreements with Chinese leaders, Morgan decided to sell the 45 percent stake held by Intercontinent in CNAC to Pan American Airways: on 1 April 1933. Morgan concluded the sale with PanAm president Juan Trippe. Trippe almost immediately put PanAm vice-president Harold Bixby in charge of the airline's new far east operation: Bixby was well known in banking and aviation circles as the man who had put up the money for the trans-Atlantic flight of Charles Lindbergh in the Spirit of St Louis.

Between 1937 and December 1941, CNAC flew many internal routes with Douglas Dolphin amphibians (Route No. 3, from Shanghai – Canton, via Wenzhou, Fuzhou, Amoy & Shantou), and Douglas DC-2s and DC-3s. In addition, three examples of the Vultee V-1A single-engine transport that "missed the boat" to Republican Spain ended up in China. Initially, the Nationalists maintained contact with the outside world through the port of Hanoi in French Indo-China, but the Japanese put pressure on the new pro-Vichy regime there to cut off relations with them in 1940–41. Flying in mainland China during the war with Japan was dangerous. A CNAC aircraft was the first passenger aircraft in history to be destroyed by enemy forces, in the Kweilin Incident in August 1938.

By fall 1940, CNAC operated service from Chongqing (via Kunming and Lashio) to Rangoon, Chengdu, Jiading (via Luzhou and Yibin) and Hong Kong (via Guilin).

As the Japanese blockade of materials, fuel and various supplies severely strangulated China's already-deprived war effort, particularly with the continued Battles of Chengdu-Chongqing, Lanzhou, Changsha, Kunming, the looming Japanese invasion of Burma, Major General Mao Bangchu of the Nationalist Air Force of China was tasked with leading the exploration of suitable air-routes over the dangerous Himalayas in 1941; this resulted with the first recorded flight between Dinjan, Burma, to Kunming, China with CNAC pilot Charles L. Sharp in what was to become the route now known as "The Hump" in November of that year.

On 8, 9 and 10 December 1941, eight American pilots of the China National Aviation Corporation (CNAC) and their crews made a total of 16 trips between Kai Tak Airport in the British Crown Colony of Hong Kong, then under attack from Japanese forces, and Chongqing, the wartime capital of the Republic of China. Together they made 16 sorties and evacuated 275 persons including Soong Ching-ling (the widow of Sun Yat-sen), and the Chinese Finance Minister H.H. Kung.

During World War II, CNAC was headquartered in India, and flew supplies from Assam, India, into Yunnan, southwestern China through the Hump Route over the Himalayas, after the Japanese blocked the Burma Road. Despite the large casualties inflicted by the Japanese and more significantly, the ever-changing weather over the Himalayas, the logistics flights operated daily, year round, from April 1942 until the end of the war. The CNAC was a smaller part of the overall re-supply operations which included the USAAF's India-China Division of Air Transport Command.

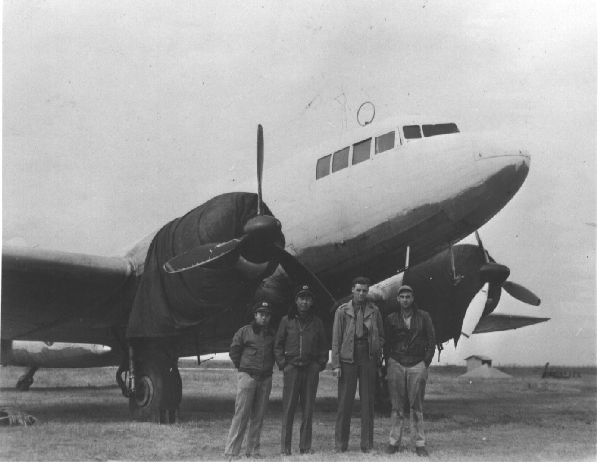
CNAC pilots with a captured Shōwa L2D3 or L2D3-L, c. 1945

After World War II, in 1946, CNAC moved from India to Shanghai, specifically Longhua Airport, located on the western shore of the Huangpu River, 10 km from the center of Shanghai. The company was a huge organization, with departments for transportation, mechanics, medicine, food, finance, etc. The employees who numbered in the thousands were housed in dormitories located in the Shanghai French Concession. Every morning, the company took the employees by a car convoy from the dormitories to the airport.

CNAC eventually operated routes from Shanghai to Beiping, Chongqing, and Guangzhou, using Douglas DC-2 and DC-3 aircraft. Apart from purchasing war surplus planes, CNAC had also acquired brand new Douglas DC-4s, to serve the route between Shanghai and San Francisco.

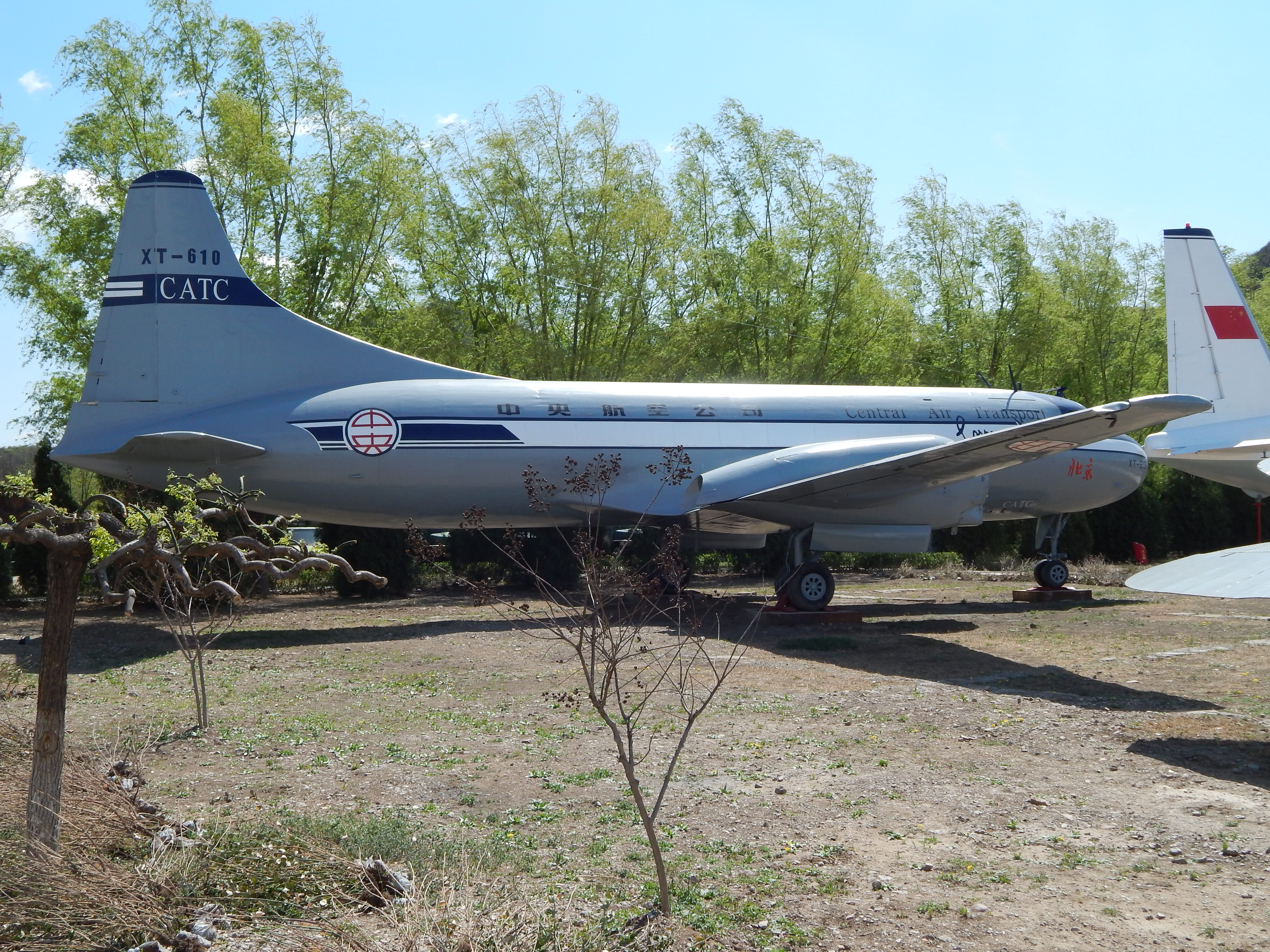
The former Central Air Transport Convair 240 on display at the Beijing Aviation Museum.

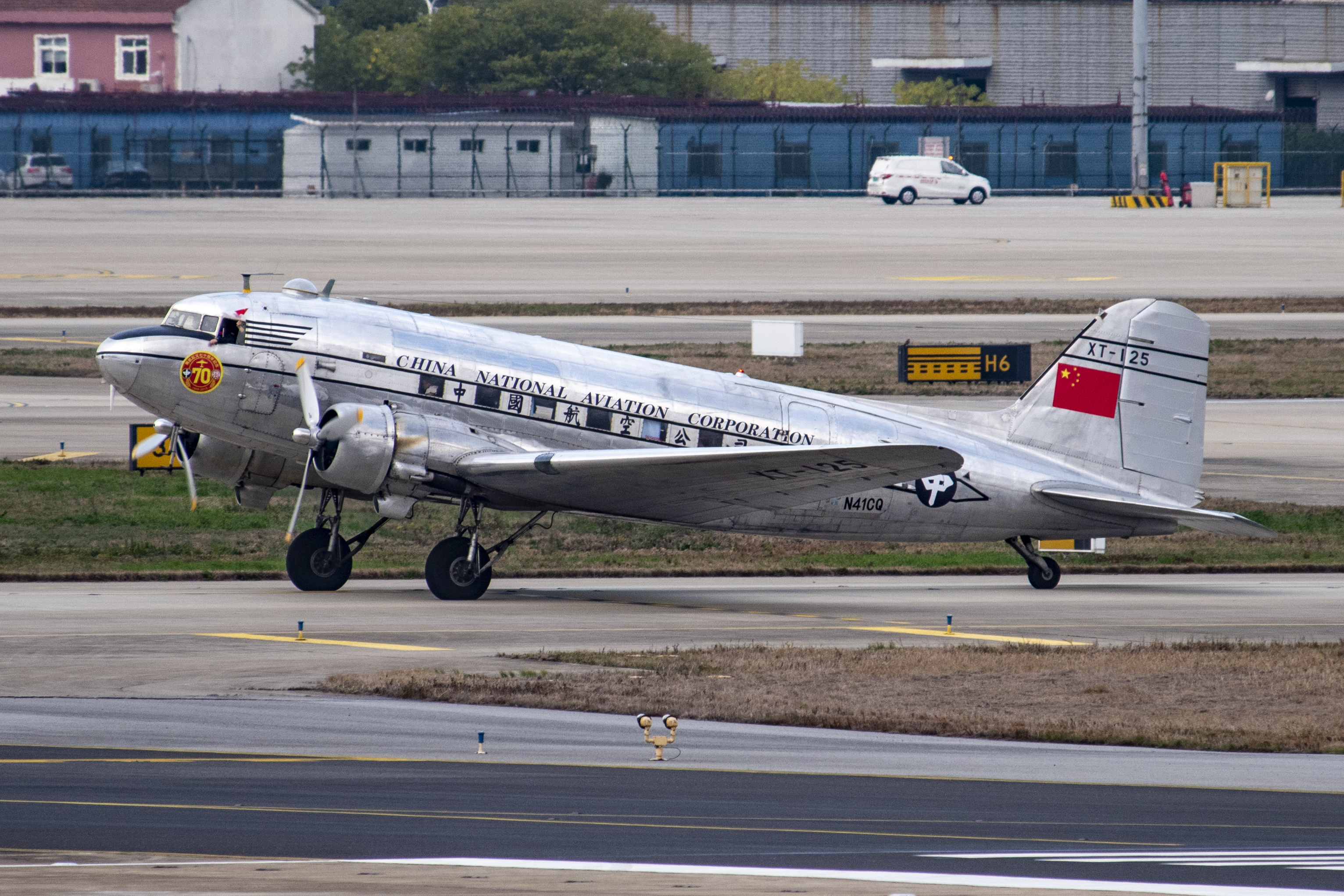
A DC-3 repainted in CNAC livery at Shanghai Hongqiao International Airport in December 2019

The downfall of CNAC's operations came on 9 November 1949, when managing director of CNAC, Colonel CY Liu, and general manager of CATC (Central Air Transport Corporation), Colonel CL Chen with a skeleton crew defected with 12 aircraft in unauthorized take-offs from Hong Kong Kai Tak Airport to Communist-controlled China. The lead aircraft (Convair 240) was welcomed with pomp and ceremony in Beijing, while the other 11 landed safely in Tianjin. The aircraft were pursued by Nationalist fighter planes but were shielded by heavy cloud cover. The remaining airline staff with their families (a total of 3,400) snuck into China by land or sea later. The ideology behind the defection was nationalism as they believed that the Communist Party would best lead one, strong China. On 1 August 1950, both companies came back to operate services. Later they were merged to form the People's Aviation Company of China in May 1952, and eventually became part of CAAC Airlines in June 1953. Today the original Convair 240 (with one engine missing) is on display at a Military Aviation Museum in Beijing. Liu left China in 1971 for Australia where he died in May 1973.

The remaining 71 aircraft in Hong Kong were sold by the Nationalists, who had retreated to the island of Taiwan, to the Delaware-registered Civil Air Transport Inc (CAT) in an effort to save the aircraft from the Communists. After a lengthy legal battle (which went on appeal from Hong Kong to Privy Council in UK, as reported in 1951 Appeal Cases) the planes were delivered by the Hong Kong government to CAT in 1952.

Peter Goutiere and Moon Fun Chin, who flew supplies over the dangerous Hump Campaign to resupply the Chinese during World War Two, were the last surviving CNAC pilots. Goutiere died on 22 January 2023 at age 108, while Chin died on 9 May 2023 at age 110.

== Accidents and incidents ==
- 19 November 1931: A Stinson Detroiter (named Jinan) crashed into the mountains near Jinan city, killing all three on board, including famous Chinese writer Xu Zhimo.
- 10 April 1934: Sikorsky S-38B NC17V crashed in Hangzhou Bay, killing all four on board; some debris was found 10 days later but the body of pilot Robert H. Gast was not found until four months later. The cause of the crash was never determined.
- 8 August 1937: Sikorsky S-43W NC16930 (named Chekiang) ditched in Bias Bay (now Daya Bay) due to weather, killing three of 11 on board; the eight survivors clung to a wing until rescued.
- 24 August 1938: Douglas DC-2-221 32 (named Kweilin) made a forced landing after an attack by Japanese fighters; the aircraft was strafed on the ground, killing 14 of 17 on board; the aircraft was repaired and returned to service. Kweilin was the first commercial aircraft to be shot down.
- 29 October 1940: Douglas DC-2-221 39 (Chungking) was attacked and destroyed on the ground by Japanese fighters after landing at Changyi Airfield, killing nine of 12 on board.
- 20 January 1941: Ford AT-5-D Trimotor 23 struck a mountain in Jiangxi Province, killing five of six on board.
- 12 February 1941: Douglas DC-2-190 XT-OBF (also registered as 40, named Kangtang) struck a mountain near Taohsien, Hunan in a thunderstorm, killing the three crew.
- 8 December 1941: Nine aircraft (four CNAC AT-32s and two DC-2s, two Eurasia Ju 52s, and a Pan Am S-42) were destroyed on the ground at Kai Tak Airport by Japanese bombers during the Battle of Hong Kong.
- 14 March 1942: Douglas DC-2-221 31 (named Chungshan) crashed on takeoff from Kunming Airport due to engine failure and overloading, killing 13 of 17 on board.
- 17 November 1942: Douglas C-47 60 struck a mountain at 13,400 feet in the Cang Shan ridge, Himalayas due to icing, killing the three crew; the wreckage was found in 2011.
- 11 March 1943: Douglas C-53 53 crashed on Kao I Kung Shan Ridge near the China/Myanmar border after encountering a downdraft, killing the three crew.
- 13 March 1943: Douglas C-53 49 disappeared while on a Kunming-Dinjan flight with three crew on board. The aircraft encountered bad weather and crashed in the Patkai Range, Burma due to possible shifted cargo (tin bars); the wreckage has never been found.
- 7 April 1943: Douglas C-53 58 (also registered 42-15890) crashed on a mountain peak 30 mi NE of Minzong due to weather and icing, killing one of three crew. The crew encountered heavy icing and snow shortly after takeoff from Dinjan. The pilot decided to turn around an hour later and return but while returning the pilot performed an evasive maneuver to avoid a mountain. The aircraft slid over the side of the mountain and crashed on a second mountain at 13,750 feet.
- 11 August 1943: Douglas C-53 48 crashed in the Fort Hertz valley following an in-flight fire and wing separation, killing the three crew; the aircraft was probably shot down by a Japanese fighter.
- 13 October 1943: Douglas C-47 72 crashed 125 km (78 mi) north of Myitkyina, Burma (now Myanmar), killing the three crew; the aircraft was probably shot down by Japanese fighters.
- 19 November 1943: Two aircraft (Douglas C-53 59 and C-47 63) crashed while on approach to Wujiaba Airfield in poor weather, killing a total of five.
- 18 December 1943: Douglas C-47A 83 crashed into a cliff near Xuzhou (Suifu) while attempting a go-around following an aborted landing below minimums, killing the three crew.
- 20 February 1944: Douglas C-47A 75 crashed into a mountain after taking off from Dinjan Airfield after encountering turbulence while flying through a cloud, killing both pilots.
- 26 May 1944: Douglas C-47A 82 crashed in the Himalayas in southern Tibet after overflying its destination due to weather and radio problems, killing all 12 on board.
- 8 June 1944: Douglas C-47A 85 crashed near Dinjan Airport due to an in-flight fire and wing separation caused by improper maintenance, killing all six on board.
- 15 June 1945: Douglas C-47A 81 disappeared while on a Yunnanyi-Xuzhou (Suifu) flight with three crew on board.
- 20 October 1945: Douglas C-47B 104 crashed in a village 13 mi northeast of Suichang, killing all 13 on board and seven villagers.
- 20 September 1946: CNAC Flight 81 struck the side of Lochi Mountain near Hsichia, killing all 31 on board; the aircraft was either a C-46 or a C-47.
- 16 December 1946: A CNAC DC-3 crashed into three parked aircraft at Longhua Airport, killing five.
- 25 December 1946: Three aircraft (CNAC C-47 140, C-46 115 and Central Air Transport C-47 48) crashed near Shanghai in poor visibility, killing a total of 62 in what became known as China's "Black Christmas".
- 5 January 1947: CNAC Flight 121 struck a mountain near Qingdao, killing all 42 on board. The aircraft was operating a Shanghai-Qingdao-Beijing passenger service.
- 25 January 1947: Douglas C-47 138 crashed in a mountainous area 119 mi south of Chongqing, killing all 19 on board.
- 28 January 1947: Curtiss C-46 XT-T45 (also registered as 145) crashed 30 minutes after takeoff from Hankou due to wing separation following an engine fire, killing 25 of 26 on board.
- 27 October 1947: A Douglas DC-3 was shot down by Communist anti-aircraft fire and crashed near Yulin, killing two of the three crew.
- 20 January 1948: A Curtiss C-46 crashed on takeoff from Mukden Airport in a snowstorm while operating an evacuation service, killing 11 of 54 on board.
- 12 December 1948: A Douglas DC-3 crashed on landing at Sung Shan Airport, killing two of 10 on board.
- 21 December 1948: Douglas C-54B XT-104 struck a mountain on Basalt Island in poor visibility and poor weather, killing all 35 on board. One of the passengers killed in the accident, Quentin Roosevelt, was the grandson of President Theodore Roosevelt and son of WWII Medal of Honor recipient, Ted Roosevelt Jr. Quentin Roosevelt who had served in WWII in France had attained the rank of Major. Quentin was a Director of CNAC at the time of his death.
- 30 January 1949: A CNAC aircraft was hijacked by six people and diverted to Tainan.

== See also ==
- Civil aviation in China
- Civil Aviation University of China
- Lists of defunct airlines
- state-owned enterprise
- George Conrad Westervelt - retired USN captain and advisor to CNAC from 1930 to 1931
- William Langhorne Bond, vice president of operations 1937-1948
- China's Wings - 2012 book about the company and William Langhorne Bond
- Eurasia Aviation Corporation
- China Airlines - current airline of the Taiwan (Republic of China)
