= Moon Fun Chin =

Taiwanese aviator (1913–2023)

- Died: May 9, 2023; Hillsborough, California, U.S.
- Occupations: Aviator, businessman

Moon Fun Chin
- Traditional Chinese: 陳文寬
- Simplified Chinese: 陈文宽
Transcriptions
Standard Mandarin
- Hanyu Pinyin: Chén Wénkuān
Yue: Cantonese
- Jyutping: can4 man4 fun1

Moon Fun Chin (Chinese: 陳文寬; April 13, 1913 / 1914 (Note: He personally reported his date of birth as 13 April 1913, but this was possibly due to a fabrication by his father in order to gain citizenship, according to Gregory Crouch) – May 9, 2023) was a Chinese-American aviator, businessman and supercentenarian. A native of Taishan, Guangdong, he immigrated to the United States, and obtained a pilot's license there. In 1933, he returned to China for aviation development. Chin was the deputy director of the aviation team of the China National Aviation Corporation, and later the director and deputy manager of the aviation team of Central Air Transport.

Chin piloted the plane to transport Jimmy Doolittle after the American air raid on Tokyo in 1942, and also the executive plane to transport Chiang Kai-shek, Sun Fo, Dai Li, T. V. Soong, Chiang Ching-kuo and other senior officials. He had also flown for the heavy-airlift supply line operation between China, Burma and India, known as The Hump. In 1951, together with Dai Anguo, Cai Kefei and others, he co-founded TransAsia Airways in Taiwan. In 1983, China National Industrial Group bought 70% of the shares of TransAsia Airways, and Chin returned to the United States, this time moving to San Francisco, California. He resided in Hillsborough, California.

Chin died on May 9, 2023.
