= William Langhorne Bond =

American aviator and aviation executive

William Langhorne Bond (November 12, 1893 – July 17, 1985) was an American aviator and aviation executive. From 1931 until 1948 he was operations manager and vice-president of China National Aviation Corporation.

He was born in Petersburg, Virginia, the second son of Thomas Baker and Mary (Langhorne) Bond. After completing high school in 1911 he joined a heavy construction company. When the United States entered World War I, he volunteered for the Army, joining a Virginia National Guard unit. He completed officer training while serving in Europe and demobilized with the rank of lieutenant in 1919.

He resumed working in the civil construction industry until contacted by George Conrad Westervelt of Curtis Aviation, (soon to become Curtiss-Wright Corporation) in 1929 to manage construction of a new aircraft factory in Baltimore. The plant was completed but due to the Black Tuesday stock market crash of 1929 the facility stayed idle.

== China National Aviation Corporation ==
In 1930 the Curtiss-Wright Corporation owned a 45% stake in the China National Aviation Corporation, in partnership with the Nationalist government of China. Westervelt selected Bond as the manager for CNAC, and Bond arrived in Shanghai in 1931. The first route ran from Hankou to Chongqing, along the Yangtze River. Since prepared airfields were uncommon at that time, the initial airline fleet consisted of six Loening Aeronautical Engineering "Air Yacht" flying boat amphibious aircraft, which could land on a river or other open water as well as landing fields. A second scheduled air route between Shanghai to Beijing could not be put into operation until 1933; during this time there was a major flood of the Yangtze river and the Japanese invasion (Mukden Incident) of mainland China.

In 1933 Pan American Airways bought out the 45% share of CNAC that was held by Curtiss-Wright. Pan Am wished to obtain landing rights in China for trans-Pacific routes, but due to international treaties forced on China in the 19th century, granting landing rights to an American company would also require China to grant landing rights to Japan, which had just invaded China. Bond maintained his VP of operations position after the new Pan Am ownership; a new route was added to the CNAC system by Pan Am.

In 1937 on the outbreak of the war between China and Japan, due to growing concerns about preserving American neutrality, Bond effectively resigned from his position at Pan-Am and became a direct employee of CNAC. As the war progressed, Bond realized the importance of an air route between India, Burma and China. In 1941 he wrote a memorandum outlining the possibilities of what was later to be known as The Hump route. Bond attempted to keep the civilian nature of the airline intact during the war.

== Return to the United States ==
After the Chinese Communist Revolution, the Pan Am interest in CNAC was wound up. In spite of operations during civil and global war, Pan Am's remaining share of CNAC was sold to the Chinese government at a profit. Bond returned to the United States in 1950. He purchased a working farm and served on the board of directors of the Kentucky River Coal Company. William Bond died in 1985.

Bond had started compiling his memoirs, which were later edited by James E. Ellis and published in 2001 as "Wings for an Embattled China".

== Family ==
While returning from a vacation in the United States in 1934, Bond met Katherine Dunlop (1905–1988); they were married in Beijing May 15, 1935. The couple had two sons, Langhorne Bond (who later became head of the Federal Aviation Administration) and Thomas Dunlop Bond (July 12, 1942-).
