= J. Lynn Helms =

American government official (1925–2011)

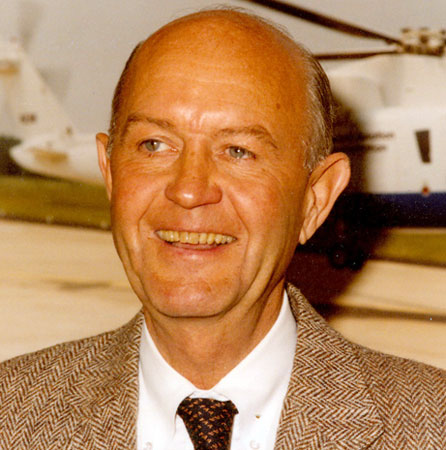

8th Administrator of the Federal Aviation Administration
- In office April 22, 1981 – January 31, 1984
- President: Ronald Reagan
- Preceded by: Langhorne Bond
- Succeeded by: Donald D. Engen

Personal details
- Born: Jonee Lynn Helms; March 1, 1925 De Queen, Arkansas, U.S.
- Died: December 11, 2011 (aged 86) Westport, Connecticut, U.S.
- Party: Republican
- Education: University of Oklahoma

Jonee (Note: Pronounced "Johnnie") Lynn Helms (March 1, 1925 – December 11, 2011) was a U.S. Marine Corps officer who served as president of Piper Aircraft Corp. and as administrator of the Federal Aviation Administration.

During his tenure as FAA Administrator, Helms originated and oversaw development of the 1982 National Airspace System (NAS) Plan; he headed the U.S. delegation to the United Nations emergency session following the Soviet Union's shooting down of Korean Air Lines Flight 007 and played a key role in the August 3, 1981 Air traffic Control Strike that resulted in the termination of over 11,000 air traffic controllers.

== History ==
=== Personal life ===
Helms was born in De Queen, Arkansas on March 1, 1925. In 1946 he married Lorraine Bisgard, who remained his wife for the rest of his 65 years. They had four children together, two girls and two boys. One of their sons, Jon L. Helms II, predeceased his father in 1987.

=== Military service ===
Helms began his aviation career when he joined the U.S. Navy Aviation Cadet training program while at the University of Oklahoma, early in 1942. On completion of the program he was commissioned as a second lieutenant, U.S. Marine Corps, remaining in the service as a regular officer after the end of WW-II. Subsequent service included postings to Japan, China, Korea and various aircraft carriers, and other military assignments. He became a U.S. Navy test pilot on graduation from the U.S. Navy Test Pilot School, was awarded the U.S. Marine Corps Air Medal, and the USAF Air Medal with Oak Leaf Cluster for Combat and Exceptional Service during the Korean War. He subsequently retired from the Marine Corps in 1956 with the rank of lieutenant colonel.

=== Career in the aerospace industry ===
After leaving the Marine Corps, Helms initially worked as a design engineer for North American Aviation, with subsequent positions of sales manager, and director of plans and programs. In 1963 he joined the Bendix Corporation, holding successive positions as Systems Division general manager, group manager, and group vice president, aerospace. In that latter position he directed the Launch Support Division, that prepared all lunar and orbiter flights from Cape Kennedy. He also personally directed the Systems Division in designing, assembling, packaging and installing the ALSEP (Apollo Lunar Scientific Exploration Package) for Apollo astronauts to leave on the moon on the first lunar landing.

In 1970 he accepted the position of president, Norden Division, United Aircraft Corporation. In 1974 he was elected president and CEO of Piper Aircraft Corporation, later being named chairman of the board. In 1975 he negotiated with the Vice President of Brazil to construct a factory and build Piper general aviation aircraft in Brazil. He joined the vice president in early 1978 to accept the first airplane off the production line at the new facility, Embraer, in San Jose Dos Compos, Brazil. In 1977 Helms landed the first private airplane in Warsaw, Poland. Following subsequent visits he negotiated an agreement with Pezetel, the Polish National Aircraft Co., to build Piper aircraft, the first general aviation aircraft built behind the iron curtain.

=== Government service ===
In 1980 he retired from Piper, and subsequently accepted a role in laying out the National Aviation Program for the incoming Reagan Administration. He was nominated by President Reagan for the office of Administrator of the Federal Aviation Administration, and confirmed by the U.S. Senate. He would later resign in 1983 over a grand jury investigation of illegal business activities.

In 1981 he headed the U.S. delegation to London for Bi-Lateral Technical and Operating Procedures with the UK. Then, in 1982, he led the delegation for review of International Civil Air discussions for the Western Mediterranean, which included North African and Southern European countries. Also that year Helms was named Special Ambassador to deliver thanks to the King of Morocco, and individual recognition awards to each crew member of the two Air Morocco aircraft that flew into Tehran, to recover U.S. hostages.

Helms is acknowledged as the “father” of the National Airspace Systems Plan (NAS Plan). In that effort he personally directed the evaluation of U.S. aviation systems capability, and outlined a concept for air traffic control and attendant scheduling proficiency for aircraft collision avoidance. Helms personally originated the concept to remove mid-air collision avoidance from ground control, and place it into aircraft. His program resulted in TCAS, (Traffic Collision and Avoidance System), initially mandatory for U.S. carriers, and subsequently adopted by international aviation. For this accomplishment Helms was nominated for The Collier Trophy. He also initiated the National Airspace Review, to develop methods and procedures for improved safety and operational efficiency in use of all national airspace.

In 1983 Helms was selected by the President to head the U.S. delegation to the United Nations, ICAO emergency convening which followed the downing of Korean Airlines Flight 007 by the Soviet Union. That year he also headed the U.S. delegation to the UK for Bi-Lateral Aviation and Airworthiness technical and operational review in London.

In 1984 Helms represented the U.S. at the Trans-European conference on Air Carrier Tariffs in Prague, and later that year chaired the U.S. Team for Air Traffic Control and Technology in Moscow for the U.S.–USSR conference directed to the 21st century. That year he was also selected as recipient of the Smithsonian Institution-residenced Glen L. Gilbert trophy.

=== Contribution to aviation education ===
Helms lectured numerous times at various U. S. Government educational institutions on the subject of “Planning and Control”. In addition to The War College, Helms holds the invited lecturer record, at seventeen years, and was named Honorary Professor, National War College. In 1982 Helms was selected by The Royal Aeronautical Society, approved by the Queen, to be the American chosen to deliver the Annual Wright Brothers Lecture, at the Royal Academy Awards assembly in London. In 1984 he was awarded a Doctoris Honoris in Aviation Sciences, for his personal development of a new curriculum introduced at the University of Illinois, now offered by over three dozen Colleges and Universities, which reflected the President's call for increased emphasis on science, math and technical education. He was also awarded the annual Alpha Eta Rho award, “for outstanding contributions to Aviation education.”

=== Awards and achievements ===
Helms was affiliated with and a member of numerous national and international organizations and entities. He was:

- a fellow in the American Institute of Aeronautics and Astronautics
- a trustee of the USAF Flight Test Museum
- a life member of the Society of Experimental Test Pilots
- a member of Tau Beta Pi Engineering Society
- an honorary <what?> in the Air Traffic Control Association
- co-founder of the J. Lynn Helms Aviation Science Scholarship Fund, University of Illinois
- a retired member of the Wings Club of New York City

In 1978 he was named General Aviation Man of the Year, and in 1979 was named chairman of the General Aviation Manufacturer's Association. In 1980, The Society of Experimental Test Pilots selected him for the General James H. Doolittle award and trophy. In 1982 he was named PenJerDel Man of the Year in International Aviation, and also that year was selected as the first recipient of the Gen. Pete R. Quesada award for Excellence in Management. The same year he was awarded a Doctorate Honoris in Aviation Management for development of the National Airspace Systems Plan (NAS Plan).

=== Death ===
He died on December 11, 2011 of complications from cardiopulmonary failure and pneumonia at his Westport home.

== Notes ==
Government offices
Preceded by Langhorne M. Bond	Administrator of the Federal Aviation Administration; 1981–1984	Succeeded by Donald D. Engen
