= Black Christmas disaster =

Series of aviation incidents in China

Coordinates: 31°13′43″N 121°28′29″E

December 25 Air Crashes case
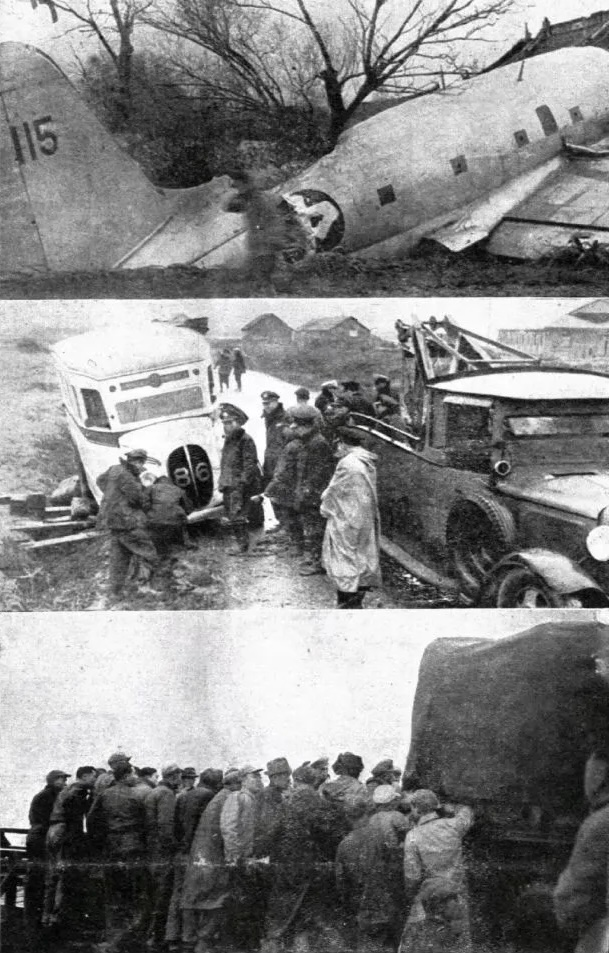
- Crash site of CNAC Flight 115
- Native name: 12·25空難案
- Date: December 25, 1946
- Location: Longhua Airport, Shanghai, China
- Deaths: 62 (61 in planes, 1 on the ground)
- Injuries: 16
- Inquiries: Civil Aeronautics Administration、National Political Assembly、Control Yuan、Shanghai District Court Procuratorate
- Accused: China National Aviation Corporation (CNAC), Central Air Transport Corporation (CATC)
- Convicted: None (due to 1947 New Year Amnesty)
- Charges: Negligent homicide, Corporate manslaughter

The Black Christmas disaster was a series of air crashes that took place in Shanghai, China, on 25 December 1946. This event involved three out of the four flights scheduled for Shanghai that day, including CA 48, CNAC 140, and CNAC 115. These crashes were primarily attributed to extremely poor visibility conditions due to foggy weather. As a result, the air crashes disaster claimed the lives of 62 and resulted in 16 injuries.

At that time, this event was described as the "greatest air disaster in China's aviation history". According to Smithsonian Magazine, it was "the worst single day in early commercial aviation".

== Background ==
=== Post-war transition ===
After World War II, millions of Chinese, who had evacuated to Southwest China during the war with Japan, had to return to the East, which led to increasing demand for air transport. This surge in demand enabled fast development of two major airlines in China, i.e. China National Aviation Corporation (CNAC) and Central Air Transport Corporation (CA). CNAC was the largest airline in China, which was jointly owned by the Nationalist government and Pan American Airways. With its wartime headquarters in Kolkata, India, the airline was a major operator on the Hump over the Himalayas. Post war, it relocated its headquarters to Shanghai and saw a major development of flight routes due to the post-war transition. Another Chinese airline, CA, which was wholly owned by the Nationalist government and operated mainly by Chinese, also grasped the opportunity to expand its network.

However, as China plunged into a civil war between Nationalists and Communists, the country, lacking resources, struggled to repair wartime damages and improve infrastructure. The civil war led to a period of hyperinflation, severely impacting the profitability of airlines despite significant increases in ticket prices. This financial strain was further exacerbated by disparities in the remuneration of Chinese and American staff within CNAC. The resultant discontent among Chinese employees culminated in nationwide strikes from late May to early June 1946. These strikes, however, concluded with the dismissal of the strike leaders.

=== Airports in Shanghai ===
Shanghai Longhua Airport was the hub of two major Chinese airlines, CNAC and CA. The airport had a runway made from grass and gravel, which was hard to be seen even with good weather conditions. The airport, despite being one of the best airports in China for civil aviation, did not have any equipment for night and blind landing. The municipal government of Shanghai had formulated plans to enhance its aviation infrastructure. However, progress was hindered by challenges in clarifying the property ownership of the land designated for Longhua's development. Additionally, a lack of financial resources further impeded the execution of these construction projects.

24 kilometres north to Longhua, Jiangwan airport was operated by the US military, which had adopted a ground control approach (GCA) system ensuring safe landing during poor weather. The GCA system at Jiangwan was so new that the earliest installation in the US would be at least four months later. CNAC pilots were being trained to use this system in case of emergency. Captain Rolf Brandt Preus of CNAC Flight 115 was among the trainees of the GCA system at Jiangwan. However, the control tower of Jiangwan, as well as the GCA system, had faulty power supply throughout autumn 1946.

=== Weather conditions ===
Starting from the early morning of 25 December, the weather service of CNAC at Longhua airport forecast that the weather conditions in Shanghai would be worsening since 25 December due to an approaching warm front, causing the local weather condition impossible for landing. The weather forecast was repeatedly sent to airports in Chongqing and Wuhan through telegrams, and was known by the flight crew when they stopped over in Wuhan.

At least from 6:00 AM, Longhua had been closed due to the weather condition, with only one officer, a clerk, and a Morse code operator on duty. By late afternoon, tower controllers at Longhua learned that there were four flights heading Shanghai, including CNAC flights 115, 140, and 147 and CA Flight 48, all originated in Chongqing, a city located 1400 kilometres west to Shanghai. The airports in Shanghai had to reopen due to the arrival of the flights.

The crews of three CNAC flights – Flights 115, 140, and 147 – convened during a stopover in Wuhan, where they collectively decided to proceed to Shanghai despite adverse weather conditions. While the weather in Nanjing, their subsequent stopover, was initially suitable for landing, as evidenced by the successful landing of CA Flight 48 at 3:00 PM, it rapidly deteriorated, rendering it unsuitable for subsequent landings.

== Flight details ==
=== CA Flight 48 ===
Central Air Transport Corporation Flight 48
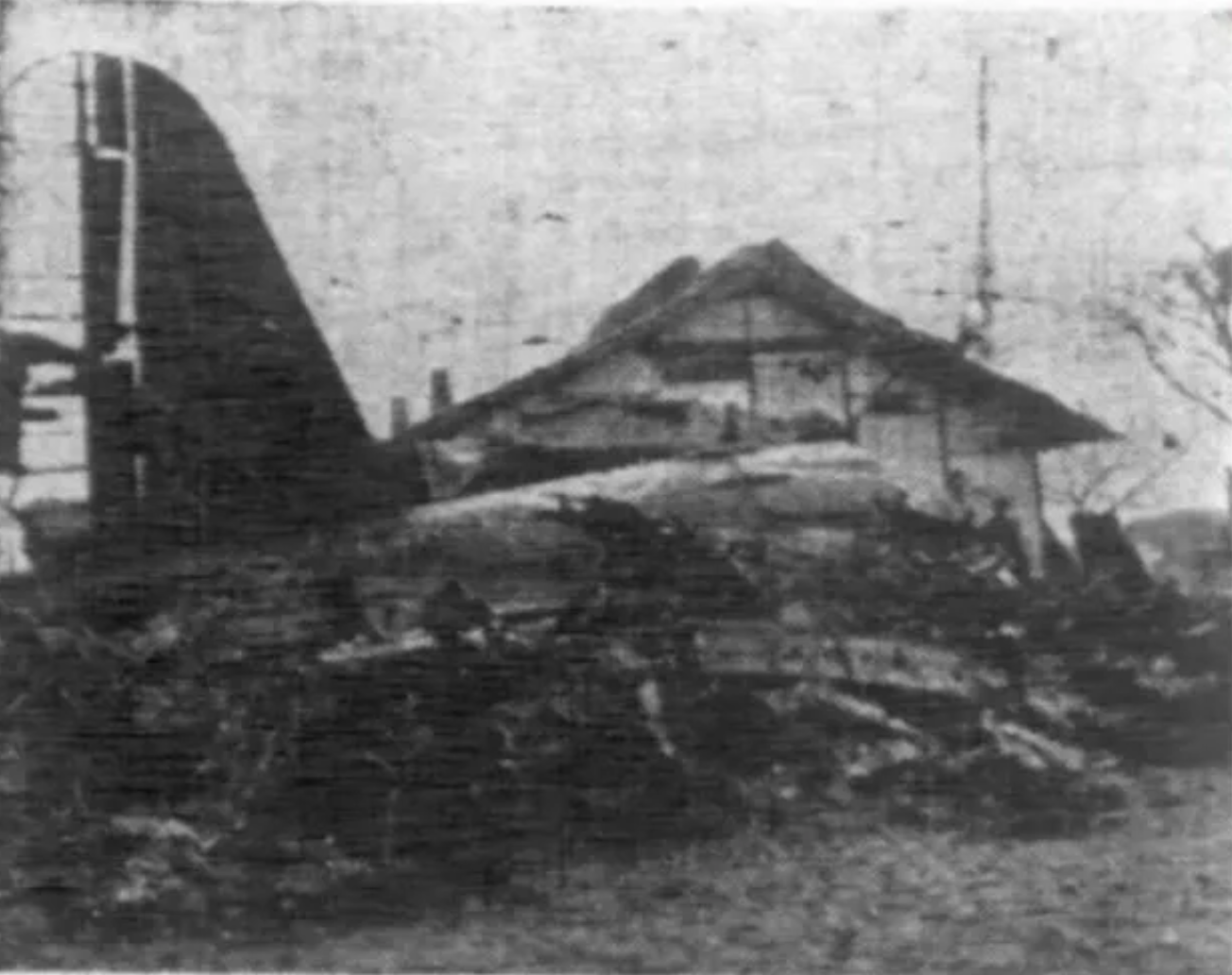
- Wreckage of the aircraft

Accident
- Date: December 25, 1946
- Summary: Crashed during landing
- Site: 200 metres north to Kiangwan Airport
- Total fatalities: 12
- Total injuries: 4

Aircraft
- Aircraft type: C-47
- Operator: Central Air Transport Corporation
- Flight origin: Shanhuba Airfield, Chongqing, China
- 1st stopover: Wangjiadun Airport, Hankou, China
- Last stopover: Ming Palace Airport, Nanjing, China
- Destination: Kiangwan Airport, Shanghai, China
- Occupants: 11
- Passengers: 7
- Crew: 4
- Fatalities: 11
- Survivors: 0

Ground casualties
- Ground fatalities: 1
- Ground injuries: 4

CA Flight 48, operated by a Douglas C-47 aircraft, departed Chongqing's Shanhuba Airport at 8:30 AM on 25 December. The aircraft arrived at Nanjing's Ming Palace Airport at around 3:00 PM, where it embarked three additional passengers before departing for Shanghai. Upon arrival in Shanghai at approximately 4:00 PM, Longhua's tower controller instructed the flight crew to return to Nanjing due to adverse weather conditions in Shanghai. Subsequently, deteriorating weather conditions in Nanjing necessitated a diversion to land at Longhua Airport. After approximately thirty minutes of circling, the aircraft was again diverted to Jiangwan airport. Contact with the flight was lost at 5:58 PM. The wreckage of CA Flight 48 was later discovered 200 metres north of Jiangwan Airport, having crashed into a local residential building. The tragic incident resulted in the deaths of all seven passengers and four crew members on board, as well as one local resident, and injuries to four people.

=== CNAC Flight 140 ===
China National Aviation Corporation Flight 140
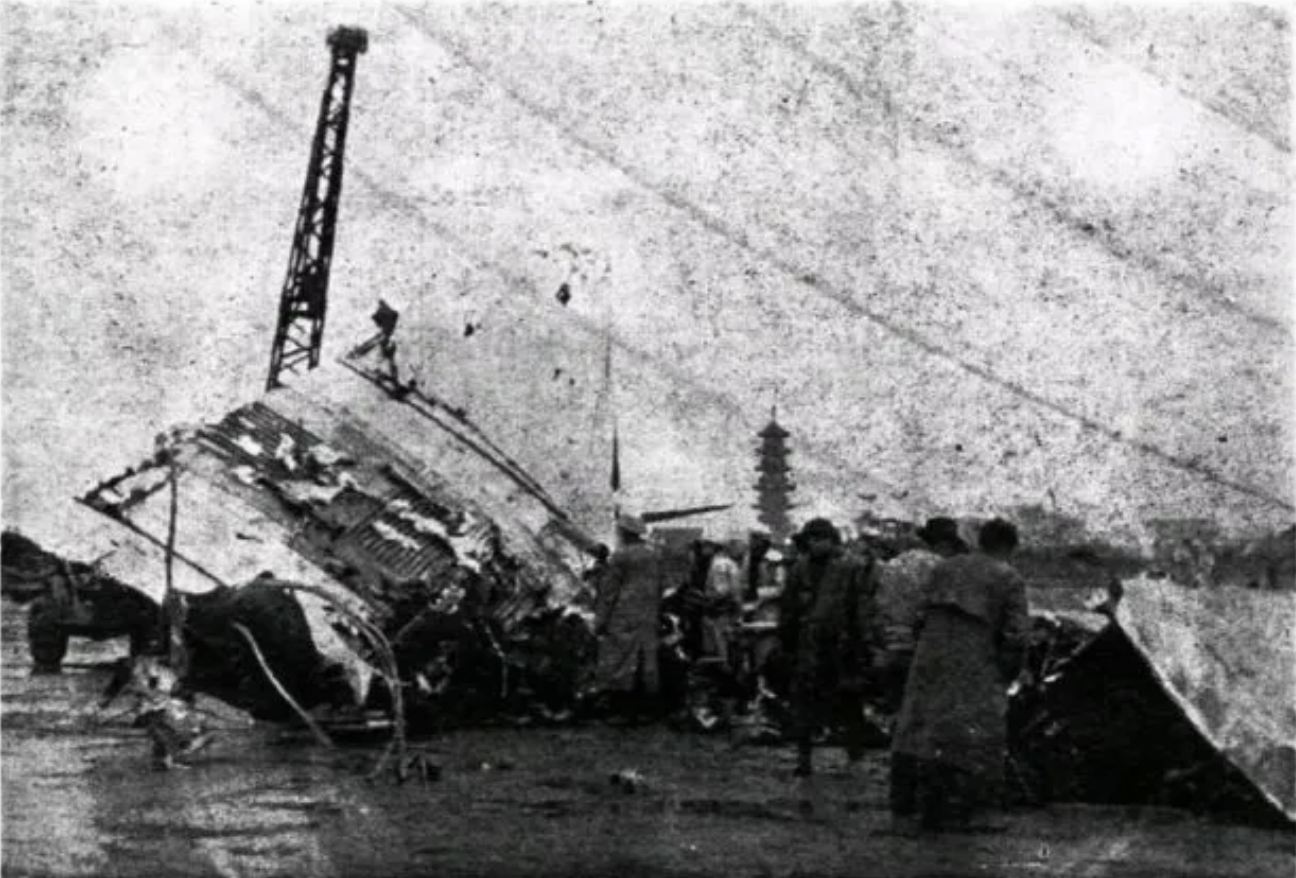
- Crash site of the aircraft

Accident
- Date: December 25, 1946
- Summary: Crashed during landing
- Site: Within Longhua Airport

Aircraft
- Aircraft type: DC-3
- Operator: China National Aviation Corporation
- Flight origin: Shanhuba Airport, Chongqing, China
- Last stopover: Xujiapeng Airport, Wuchang, Hubei, China
- Destination: Longhua Airport, Shanghai, China
- Occupants: 30
- Passengers: 27
- Crew: 3
- Fatalities: 19
- Survivors: 11

CNAC Flight 140, operated by a Douglas DC-3, departed from Chongqing's Shanhuba Airport at 10:15 with scheduled stops in Wuchang and Nanjing en route to its final destination of Shanghai. The aircraft reached Wuhan at 15:00, where CNAC was informed of poor visibility near Shanghai, but decided to continue the flight. Attempts to land at Nanjing's Ming Palace Airport were unsuccessful after three attempts and the aircraft was diverted to Shanghai.

At Jiangwan Airport, the aircraft attempted to land using the Ground Controlled Approach (GCA) system. Despite circling over Jiangwan for almost an hour, the aircraft was unable to land due to partial radio failure caused by low voltage. The control tower at Jiangwan then authorised a diversion to Longhua airport, where landing attempts were also unsuccessful. Nevertheless, senior staff members of CNAC, had been waiting at the airport, along with airport fire brigade, ambulances, paramedics and policemen ready for rescue.

The last communication with the Longhua tower was at 7:50 PM, with the crew reporting critically low fuel levels. At 7:55 PM, the plane's engines shut down and it crashed 10 metres from the Longhua runway, igniting a huge fire. The fire was put down after 15 minutes. The crash instantly killed 17 of the 27 passengers and two of the three crew members: Captain James Greenwood, First Officer Liu Linseng and Radio Operator Jin Keng. Seven passengers were injured, some of whom died in hospital.

=== CNAC Flight 115 ===
China National Aviation Corporation Flight 115
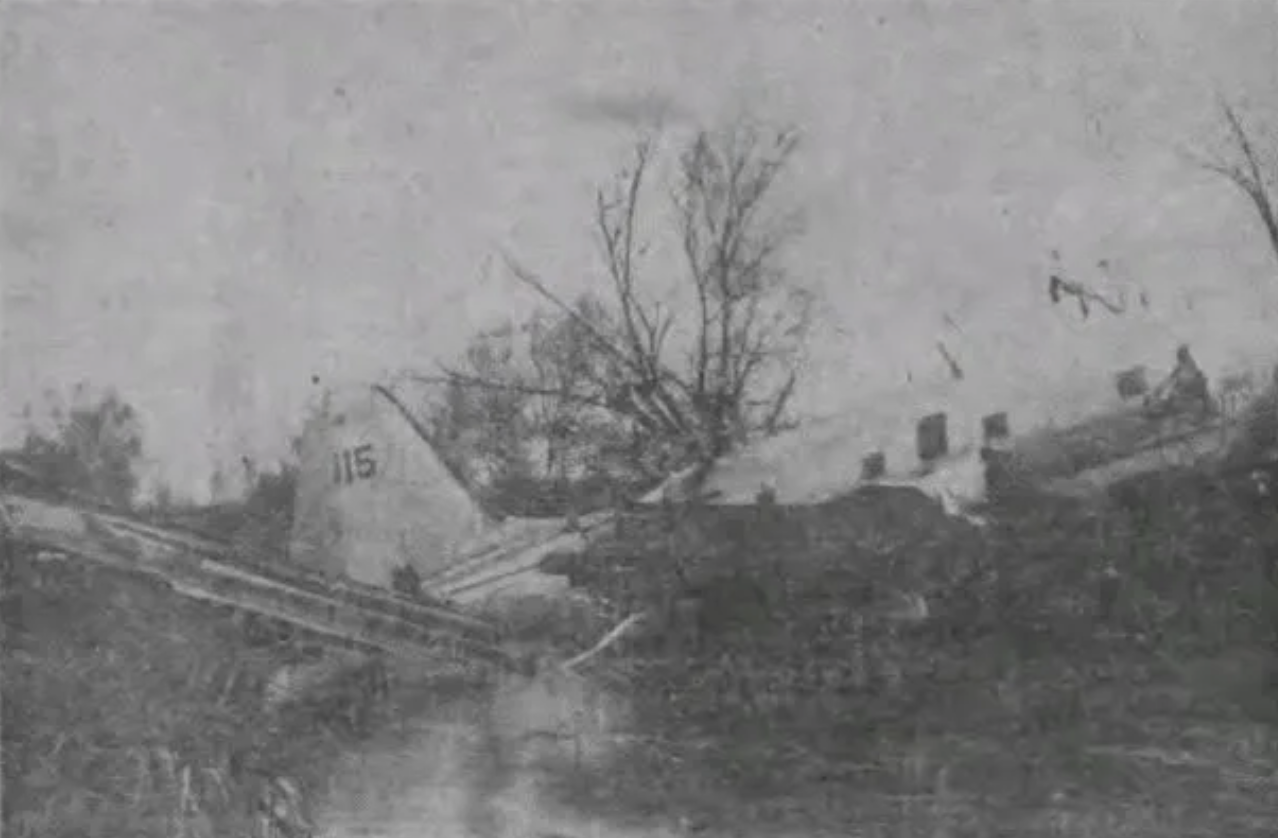
- Wreckage of the aircraft

Accident
- Date: December 25, 1946
- Summary: Crashed during landing
- Site: One mile southwest to Longhua Airport

Aircraft
- Aircraft type: C-46
- Operator: China National Aviation Corporation
- Flight origin: Baishiyi Airport, Chongqing, China
- Last stopover: Xujiapeng Airport, Wuchang, Hubei, China
- Destination: Longhua Airport, Shanghai, China
- Occupants: 36
- Passengers: 33
- Crew: 3
- Fatalities: 31
- Survivors: 5

CNAC Flight 115, operated by a Curtiss C-46, departed from Baishiyi Airport in Chongqing with a stopover in Wuchang, Hubei, heading for Shanghai's Jiangwan Airport. Despite low visibility warnings in Shanghai, the flight continued from Wuhan. Upon approaching Shanghai at 5:30 PM, the aircraft failed to establish contact with Jiangwan Airport and aborted a blind landing. When Flight 140 crashed, the flight had been circling over Jiangwan for 2.5 hours. However, due to unstable connection with GCA, the flight had to give up landing at Jiangwan, and flew to Longhua.

At 9:00 PM, the flight attempted to land at Longhua Airport due to improved visibility but crashed 1.6 kilometres southwest of the airport at a local school at 9:30 PM. The tower confirmed its crash after one hour of silence. The US army and navy joined the search for the crashed plane on the ground and in the Huangpu. The aircraft crashed into the River Pagoda Temple near the Huangpu and damaged the western half of the temple, which hosted private East China Primary School. Local villagers immediately started rescue and rushed to Shanghai High School nearby to inform CNAC via telephone.

The crash led to 31 dead, many drowned or frozen to death. 5 survivors were sent to Zhongshan Hospital in three batches from the night of 25 December to early morning of 26 December. Captain Rolf Brandt Preus survived the crash. His radio operator Wang Xiaode died of deadly injury on the night of 25 December.

== Aftermaths ==
The crashes in Shanghai led to a national shock and widespread fear of air transport. Many attendees of the National Constituent Assembly in Nanjing cancelled their tickets for returning flights.

After the tragedy, the National People's Congress held a meeting and proposed a temporary motion to dismiss the Minister of Transport, Yu Ta-wei, and the heads of both the Central and China Airlines. Regarding the C-46 and C-47 aircraft involved in the incident, Dai Jitao's son, Tai An-kuo, who was the Director of Civil Aviation at the time, was forced to admit that these transport planes, originally used for wartime needs, had already been discontinued in the United States. He acknowledged that the planes were inadequately equipped with parts and announced the cessation of future imports of these models. The Shanghai District Court's Prosecution Office later determined that the airline's lack of proper blind landing and night flying equipment was one of the causes of the crash. Both airlines were deemed responsible for "negligence leading to death". On 28 December, the court assigned prosecutors to investigate the case. However, on 1 January 1947, the Nationalist government issued a general amnesty, and the investigation was subsequently halted.

Due to public pressure, Longhua Airport underwent reconstruction of its facilities after the accident. Additionally, on 1 July 1947, the Longhua Air Station was established to manage domestic civil aviation flight dispatching.
