= Michele Clark Magnet High School =

Location
- 5101 W. Harrison St. Chicago, Illinois 60644; United States; 41.8727°N 87.7524°W

Information
- School type: Public; Secondary; Magnet
- Motto: "Where Minds Soar and Eagles Take Flight."
- Established: 1972
- School district: Chicago Public Schools
- CEEB code: 141301
- Principal: Charles Anderson Jr.
- Grades: 9–12
- Gender: Coed
- Enrollment: 426 (2022–2023)
- Campus type: Urban
- Colors: Black; Gold
- Athletics conference: Chicago Public League
- Team name: Eagles
- Accreditation: North Central Association of Colleges and Schools
- Website: micheleclark.org

Michele Clark Academic Prep Magnet High School (commonly known as Clark Prep, Clark Academic Prep and Michele Clark Magnet High School) is a public four-year magnet high school located in the Austin neighborhood on the west side of Chicago, Illinois, United States. The school is named for African–American network television reporter and Chicago-based journalist Michele Clark. In 2013, The school joined the Chicago Public Schools' STEM Program.

== History ==
Construction on the school began in March 1971 after the February 1970 decision by the Chicago Board of Education to construct three new schools on the city's west side. The school was to accommodate 1,500 students along with a recreational space conjoined with the Chicago Park District. The school opened as Austin Middle School in 1972. In 1974, the school was re–named Michele Clark Magnet High School in honor of the Chicago television journalist Michele Clark who's noted as one of the first African-American woman to serve as a news reporter. For the 2002–2003 school year, Clark was converted into a high school.

=== Michele Clark ===
Michele Clark was born June 2, 1943, in Gary, Indiana. Clark's family moved to nearby Chicago when she was a child, She attended University of Chicago Laboratory Schools; graduating in 1961. After high school, Clark moved to Iowa and studied at Grinnell College. In 1965, Clark returned to Chicago and began studying Broadcast Journalism at Roosevelt University; graduating with her B.A. Clark worked in reservations for United Airlines during her graduate education. While working as a part–time model, Clark studied at the Columbia University Graduate School of Journalism, graduating in 1972. Clark once again returned home to Chicago in May 1972, and began work as a reporter for WBBM-TV before working as a CBS News correspondent, occasional morning-show host and news anchor in Washington, D.C. Clark died on a flight from Washington to Chicago, en route to visit her parents on December 8, 1972, in the United Airlines Flight 553 at Chicago's Midway International Airport along with 43 others. Clark was 29 years old.

== Athletics ==
Clark competes in the Chicago Public League (CPL) and is a member of the Illinois High School Association (IHSA). Clark sport teams are nicknamed Eagles. The girls' basketball team were regional champions in 2004–05.
