= Dorothy Hunt =

American figure in Watergate (1920–1972)

- Dorothy Hunt in 1972
- Born: Dorothy Louise Wetzel; April 1, 1920; Dayton, Ohio, U.S.
- Died: December 8, 1972 (aged 52); Chicago, Illinois, U.S.
- Other name: Dorothy Wetzel Day Goutiere
- Known for: Watergate scandal
- Spouse(s): Peter de Goutiere (1947); E. Howard Hunt (m. September 7, 1949)
- Children: Four: Lisa, Kevan, St. John, David
- Parents: Albert C. Wetzel (1891-1954) (father); Jeannette Adams Wetzel (1891-1961) (mother)

Dorothy Hunt (April 1, 1920 – December 8, 1972) was a central figure in the 1972 Watergate coverup, known posthumously as the "Watergate paymistress".

During the 1940s, she was employed in Europe and China by the US Treasury and State departments, potentially as a cover for intelligence work. She lived and worked in Latin America along with her husband, CIA agent E. Howard Hunt. In 1972, after her husband and his co-conspirators were arrested, she negotiated for "hush money" and delivered it to the burglars.

The cover-up almost worked, but then Flight 553 failed to land.

— Garrett M. Graff

Dorothy Hunt was killed in a plane crash while carrying over $10,000 in cash, revealing publicly her role in the coverup. Official reports and modern consensus concluded the crash was accidental, while conspiracy theories speculate she might have been murdered for attempting to blackmail the president or the CIA.

Journalist Garrett M. Graff has argued Dorothy Hunt's death was pivotal to the unravelling of the Watergate coverup. Dorothy Hunt was prominently featured as a character in a 2023 HBO miniseries.

== Early life ==
Dorothy Louise Wetzel was born on April 1, 1920, in Dayton, Ohio to Albert C. Wetzel (1891-1954) and wife Jeannette Adams Wetzel (1891-1961). Family lore held that Dorothy was one-eighth Sioux, and some reports suggest she sometimes claimed to be 'full-blooded American Indian'.

Dorothy's parents had a brief marriage beginning in 1918. In 1922, her mother was hospitalized for an operation. In 1923, her mother sued for divorce. Szulc reports Dorothy was raised by an uncle after her parents' divorce at age 3, while a family source (Hunt, 2015) argues she travelled with her mother to California before later returning to Ohio; Dorothy and her mother appear in San Francisco in the 1930 census.

Dorothy attended a Cleveland high school before going on to Bowling Green State University. One source reports a Dorothy Wetzel left school by February 1939. She was fluent in French and Spanish.

== Early career ==
Bern

In 1945, Wetzel joined the Treasury Department's Hidden Asset Division and began working in Bern, Switzerland. She served as an assistant to James Speyer Kronthal. Hunt (2015) speculates she was linked to Operation Safehaven (1944–1948) to prevent the Axis powers from hiding assets in neutral nations. Originally a joint project of State and Treasury, Safe Haven later came under the leadership of the Office of Strategic Services (OSS), the predecessor of the CIA. Hunt (2015) reports his mother recalled having met OSS chief and future CIA head Allen Dulles during her time in Bern.

Shanghai

After the Japanese surrender, Wetzel traveled to Shanghai, China to set up the Treasury office there. Sometime in 1946-7, she married Peter de Goutiere, a pilot who had grown up on a family estate in India. Hunt (2015) relays tales of his mother accusing her spouse of alcoholism, abusiveness, and womanizing; She soon left her husband and returned to Shanghai. Hunt (2015) recalls that she later fled the Communist takeover of Shanghai, leaving on one of the last trains able to freely exit the city. She returned the US. Author Jeremy Kuzmarov and others report she served as a technical advisor on the 1948 film To the Ends of the Earth which is set, in part, in Shanghai.

Paris

In 1948, she applied for a position with the CIA, but accepted a position with the Economic Cooperation Administration. In 1949, she worked in Paris where she served as secretary to W. Averell Harriman in Paris during the Marshall Plan. A 1972 CIA assessment of Dorothy in this era labelled her "an amoral and dangerous woman". Hunt's son, St. John, would later adapt the quote into the title of his book Dorothy, “An Amoral and Dangerous Woman” In 1974, author Tad Szulc described her role as "secretary for the CIA station in Paris, also working under a State Department cover".

== Marriage to Hunt and life abroad ==
On September 7, 1949, having become pregnant, she married E. Howard Hunt. His family objected to his marrying a catholic divorcee. Hunt joined the CIA and the pair moved to Georgetown. Dorothy suffered a miscarriage.

On February 17, 1950, the CIA Office of Security contacted Hunt to inform him that his new wife had "left-wing attitudes regarding certain minority groups". Hunt acknowledged his wife's views and promised to take steps to minimize further complaints. The unidentified memo author concludes "I was very favorably impressed by Mr. HUNT'S attitude concerning my admonitions, and I respect him for his forthright denouncement and evaluation of his wife's shortcomings. I am firm in my belief that Mr. HUNT is thoroughly patriotic, completely anti-Communist, and that there will be no repetition of past complaints. I sincerely recommend that we close the book on this issue, and start over with a clean slate".

Hunt was named CIA station chief in Mexico City and potentially tasked with planning Operation PBSuccess, the upcoming coup of Guatemala. The couple relocated to Mexico City, and their first child, Lisa was born in March 1950. A second daughter, Kevan, was born in 1952. Dorothy suffered another miscarriage in 1953, but gave birth to the coupe's first son, St. John, in March 1954.

In June 1954, the CIA successfully overthrew the government of Guatemala, and Hunt was promoted and transferred to Tokyo, Japan. Hunt (2015) points to Norman Mailer's 1991 novel Harlot's Ghost in which a fictionalized version of Dorothy Hunt is reported responsible for theft of an Argentine codebook while in Tokyo.

In January 1957, the family moved to Montevideo, Uruguay where Hunt became station chief. While in Montevideo, the couple met sitting President Eisenhower during an embassy visit.

In 1960, the family left Uruguay and relocated to Washington D.C. where Dorothy worked at the Spanish embassy. William Buckley Jr served as Godfather to Hunt's older children and executor of her estate. Bay of Pigs leader Manuel Artime was Godfather to the Hunts' youngest child, David. In 1964, the family relocated to Madrid, Spain. The couple had a fourth child, David. In 1966, they moved to Potomac, Maryland, residing at a property that Dorothy named 'Witches Island'. She purchased an Arabian horse for herself and several quarter horses for the children. In 1968, her daughters Lisa and Kevan were in a car accident—Lisa suffered amnesia and a suicide attempt and was hospitalized for a year at the Shepard Pratt Mental Institution. Kevan suffered broken bones.

During Christmas vacation 1969, Dorothy's son St. John confessed to having been molested by a teacher at his Hagerstown, Maryland boarding school. Dorothy shared the admission with her husband and the offender fled the school.

In 1971, Dorothy's husband Howard was recruited to the White House Special Investigations Unit by Chuck Colson, Special Counsel to President Nixon. Hunt (2015) recalls Dorothy disliked her husband's co-conspirator G. Gordon Liddy, regarding him as extremist and a racist. Hunt (2015) reports his mother confided in him that her husband had been having an affair with a woman named Tricia Flores and that she was planning to divorce.

== Watergate 'paymistress' ==
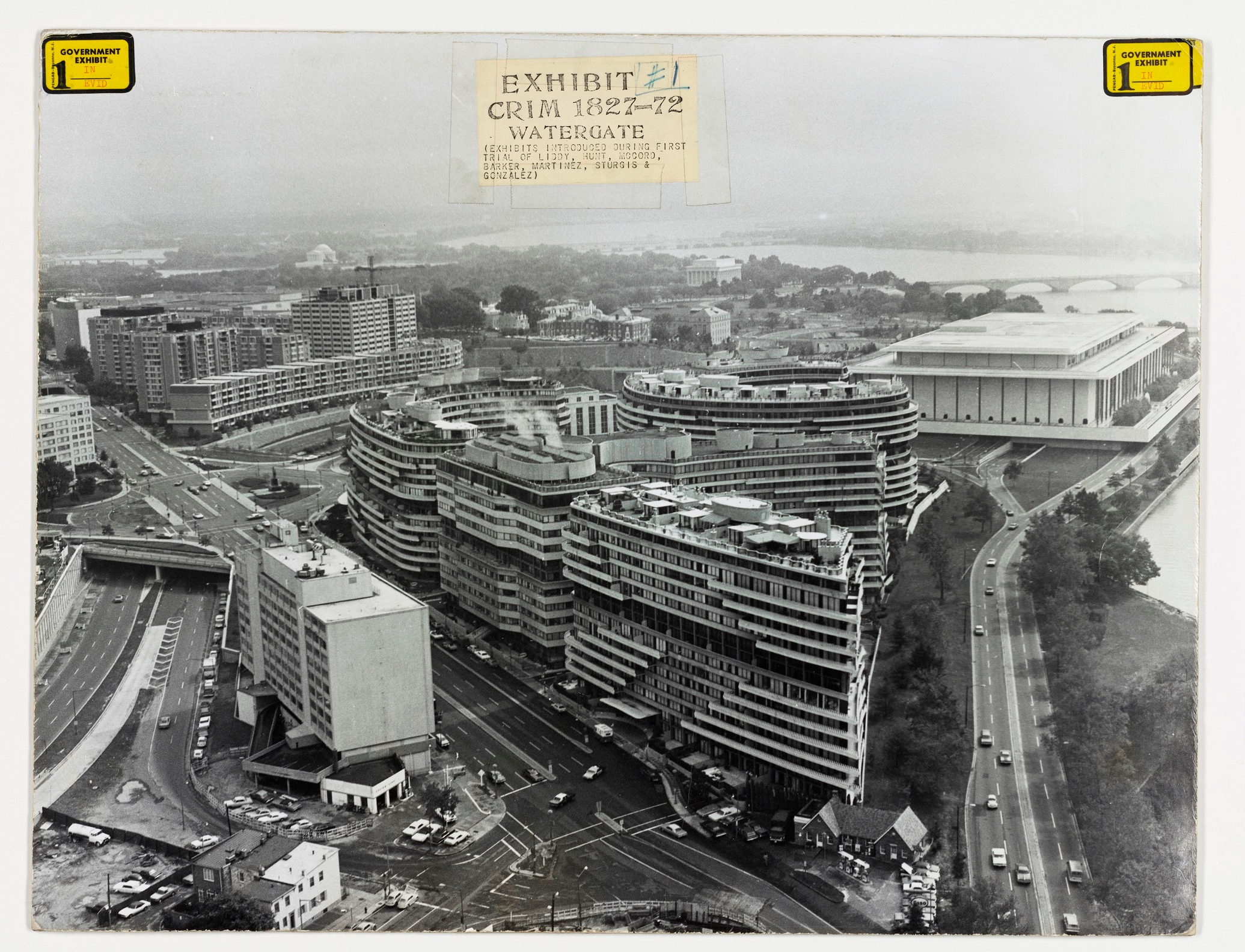
A view of the Watergate complex in Washington, D.C., with the Howard Johnson's motel to the left, with legal notation from the trial of the White House Plumbers

Dorothy Hunt was in London on June 17, 1972, when the Watergate burglars were arrested. She returned shortly thereafter. On June 27, she was interviewed by the FBI, denied any knowledge of the Watergate burglary. She told agents she was unaware of her husband's location, having last spoken to him over telephone on June 21. The Women of Watergate records that "Dorothy, alone among the Watergate wives, became an active partner in the cover-up, acting as courier to transmit huge sums in cash from the White House to other defendants".

She reportedly contacted Douglas Caddy, her husband's former attorney, and was rebuffed. Unable to contact Liddy, Dorothy Hunt visited Paul O'Brien, general counsel for the Committee to Re-Elect the President (CREEP). On July 2, Dorothy was reunited with her husband who had returned to Maryland. On July 4, she was quoted in press dismissing claims that her husband had fled to Europe. According to Howard's autobiography, on July 7, his attorney relayed having received $25,000 to cover his fees, along with a call from a "Mr. Rivers" who said he wanted to talk to "the writer's wife". Dorothy concluded the caller was a response to her visit to O'Brien.

Dorothy began communicating with "Mr. Rivers", later identified as Tony Ulasewicz, via payphone to avoid wiretaps. "Rivers" provided hush money to the defendants. Ulasewicz later recalled "I began to have a series of long tortuous conversations with the 'writer's wife,' Dorothy Hunt. On July 11, Kalmbach had called me to give me Dorothy Hunt's telephone number, instructing me to deal with her from now on. I don't know who put her in charge of arranging delivery of the rest of the money, but as soon as I spoke with her, the pattern and mood of the calls changed dramatically. She acted like a gambling casino pit boss, directing the dealer, counting the chips, figuring the odds, making sure her cut was secure. She didn't want to listen to the strictures binding my position as courier of the money. She also raised the ante each time I spoke with her."

On one occasion, Ulasewicz instructed Dorothy to retrieve locker key from a specific location at National Airport (later Dulles). Inside the locker, she would find a bag and envelope containing cash. Hunt (2015) report the first such envelope contained $40,000. She would ultimately receive at least $150,000 over four payments.

Hunt lost her job at the Spanish Embassy due to publicity surrounding Watergate. She reportedly told friends "Howard is being made a scape goat", and defending her husband by saying "They ordered him to do this and it is wrong for them to prosecute him."

Dorothy Hunt reportedly felt unease in her dealings with Jim McChord.

In October 1972, Dorothy attempted to directly communicate with Chuck Colson. On October 22, she reportedly contacted Colson's secretary Joan Hall. Colson declined to communicate with her, but later admitted she was "upset at the interruption of payment" from the White House to the Watergate defendants. Jim McChord would later recall a conversation with Dorothy where she related the Hunts having threatened "to blow the White House out of the water." On November 14, 1972, Dorothy and Howard composed a memo warning that "half measures will be unacceptable" and demanding "1. Financial Support. 2. Legal Defense Fees. 3. Pardons. 4. Rehabilitation." The memo led to another payout, received in January.

== Death and aftermath ==
On December 8, 1972, Dorothy Hunt boarded United Airlines Flight 553, bound for Chicago. The plane crashed on landing, killing Hunt and 44 others; 18 passengers survived. Among the passengers killed were Illinois congressman George W. Collins and CBS News correspondent Michele Clark. Journalist Garrett M. Graff argues the crash "was the turning point for much of the Watergate cover-up. E. Howard Hunt, at that point, personally unraveled." According to Graff, "the cover-up almost worked, but then Flight 553 failed to land."

Agents of the FBI were on the scene about 45 minutes after the accident, before any investigators from the NTSB (Note: Extract of letter written by John Reed, chairman of the NTSB to FBI Director William Ruckelshaus (June 5, 1973): Our investigative team assigned to this accident discovered on the day following the accident that several FBI agents had taken a number of non-typical actions relating to this accident within the first few hours following the accident. Included were: for the first time in the memory of our staff, an FBI agent went to the control tower and listened to the tower tapes before our investigators had done so; and for the-first time to our knowledge, in connection with an aircraft accident, an FBI agent interviewed witnesses to the crash, including flight attendants on the aircraft prior to the NTSB interviews. As I am sure you can understand, these actions, particularly with respect to this flight on which Mrs. E. Howard Hunt was killed, have raised innumerable questions in the minds of those with legitimate interests in ascertaining the cause of this accident. Included among those who have asked questions, for example, is the Government Activities Subcommittee of the House Government Operations Committee.) (Note: Extract of reply from William Ruckelshaus to John Reed: FBI has primary investigative jurisdiction in connection with the Destruction of Aircraft or Motor Vehicles (DAMV) Statute, Title 18, Section 32, U.S. Code, which pertains to the willful damaging, destroying or disabling of any civil aircraft in interstate, overseas or foreign air commerce. The fact that Mrs. E. Howard Hunt was aboard the plane was unknown to the FBI at the time our investigation was instituted. It has been longstanding FBI policy to immediately proceed to the scene of an airplane crash for the purpose of developing any information indicating a possible Federal violation within the investigative jurisdiction of the FBI. In all such instances liaison is immediately, established with the National Transportation Safety Board (NTSB) personnel upon their arrival at the scene. Approximately 50 FBI Agents responded to the crash scene, the first ones arriving within 45 minutes of the crash ... The FBI's investigation in this matter was terminated within 20 hours of the accident and on December 11, 1972, Mr. William L. Lamb, NTSB, was furnished with copies of the complete FBI investigation pertaining to this crash after it was determined there was apparently no violation of the DAMV or CAA Statutes.)—a fact that has been interpreted to suggest Dorothy Hunt might have been under FBI surveillance prior to her death.

On December 9, the White House taping system recorded a conversation in which Chuck Colson informed Nixon that Dorothy Hunt had been killed in the recent plane crash. On December 10, papers reported Dorothy Hunt had died aboard while in possession of $10,000 in cash. Howard Hunt told press that his wife was carrying the funds as an investment to be delivered to accountant Harold C. Carlstead, an accountant who was married to Dorothy's cousin. Carlstead had identified Dorothy Hunt's badly-burned body after the crash by the jewelry she wore.

On December 12–13, papers report Dorothy Hunt carried the names of three men: Gary Morris with the word 'hypnotist' in parenthesis, Marvin Korengold a Washington neurologist, and her husband's attorney William Bittman. Neurologist Korengold publicly denied knowing Dorothy Hunt and said he did not know why she would have his name, while Morris, a Washington psychiatrist, had gone missing the year prior. Hunt (2015) reports Morris had treated Dorothy the previous year.

On December 13, it was reported that one of the crisp $100 bills beginning with serial number "007" was marked "Good Luck, F.S."; Media suspected FS referred to Watergate burglar Frank Sturgis. On January 11, Howard Hunt pleaded guilty to all six charges against him, including eavesdropping, burglary, and conspiracy. On January 19, 1973, it was reported that Dorothy's cash had been returned to the family attorney by authorities.

On April 11, press reported that McCord had been paid by Dorothy Hunt. In May, William F. Buckley Jr. asked to be appointed executor of Dorothy's estate.

On May 8, 1973, Watergate burglar James W. McCord Jr. submitted a memo to the Senate Watergate committee and Federal prosecutors in the case. In it, he recalled:" Mrs. E. Howard Hunt, on or about Nov. 30; 1972, in a personal conversation with me, stated that E. Howard Hunt had just recently dictated a 3‐page letter which Hunt's attorney, William O. Bittman, had read to Kenneth Parkinson, the attorney for the Committee to Re‐elect the President, in which letter, Hunt purportedly threatened “to blow the White House out of the water.” Mrs. Hunt at this point in her conversation with me, also repeated the statement which she, too, had made before, which was that E. Howard Hunt had information which could impeach the President." Dorothy Hunt had gotten $10,000 for 'Under Table' use. That month, press reported that Dorothy had purchased flight insurance at the airport with a $225,000 benefit payable to her husband.

In July, Ulasewicz ("Mr Rivers") testified about his dealings with Dorothy Hunt, delivering a total of $154,500 to her from Herbert Kalmbach, President Nixon's personal attorney.

=== Conspiracy theories ===
Since her death, theorists have suggested Dorothy Hunt was killed for her attempt to blackmail the CIA or the Nixon Administration. Writing in 2020, the Washington Post recalled: "Immediately, questions were asked: Was Hunt murdered to keep her from revealing that the White House was in on the coverup? Was a message being sent to all the Watergate defendants?"

On June 2, 1973, papers published Sherman Skolnick's allegation that Dorothy was assassinated. Skolnick further alleged Dorothy was carrying $2 million in cash, not $10,000 as reported by authorities. Some sources have claimed "much more than" $10,000 in cash was found in Dorothy Hunt's handbag in the wreckage.

In July 1974, Time Magazine revealed a May meeting between Nixon's special counsel Chuck Colson and a Washington DC private detective named Richard Lee Bast. According to Bast and his extensive notes, Colson thought CIA was attempting to take over the nation. Colson reportedly privately confessed: "I don’t say this to my people. They’d think I’m nuts. I think they [the CIA] killed Dorothy Hunt." By 1976, media was dismissing speculations that Dorothy Hunt was killed for her knowledge of the JFK assassination. Conspiracy author Carl Oglesby devoted a chapter of his 1976 book to the "Watergate Plane Crash".

Modern consensus holds the crash was accidental. On April 26, 1973, press reported the FBI had found no evidence of sabotage in the crash. In an August 29, 1973 report, the National Transportation Safety Board concluded that the crash was caused by accidental crew error.

== In popular culture ==
Dorothy Hunt appears as a character in the 1991 Norman Mailer novel Harlot's Ghost.

In the 2023 HBO miniseries White House Plumbers, Dorothy Hunt was played by Lena Headey, where she is shown as the most intelligent Watergate operative, with her character described as a "veritable Bond girl". The fourth episode, titled "The Writer's Wife", centers on Dorothy and her death. In a use of dramatic license, the episode shows Dorothy doing a tell-all interview with fellow passenger Michele Clark, a CBS reporter; no evidence suggests such an interview actually occurred.

== See also ==
- Martha Mitchell, Watergate public figure
