= Matt Pushard =

American baseball player (born 1997)

Miami Marlins
- Pitcher
- Born: October 27, 1997 (age 29); Brewer, Maine, U.S.
- Bats: Right Throws: Right

MLB debut
- March 29, 2026, for the St. Louis Cardinals

MLB statistics (through 2026 season)
- Win–loss record: 0–0
- Earned run average: 5.14
- Strikeouts: 6
- Stats at Baseball Reference

Teams
- St. Louis Cardinals (2026)

Matthew Louis Pushard (born October 27, 1997) is an American professional baseball pitcher in the Miami Marlins organization. He has previously played in Major League Baseball (MLB) for the St. Louis Cardinals.

== Amateur career ==
Pushard attended Brewer High School in Brewer, Maine, and the University of Maine, where he played college baseball for the Maine Black Bears. In 2021, he played collegiate summer baseball with the Harwich Mariners of the Cape Cod Baseball League.

== Professional career ==
=== Miami Marlins ===
Pushard signed with the Miami Marlins as an undrafted free agent in 2022. He pitched in two games for the Rookie-level Florida Complex League Marlins during the 2022 season.

Pushard began the 2023 season with the Beloit Sky Carp and also pitched for the Pensacola Blue Wahoos. Pushard returned to Pensacola for the beginning of the 2024 season and was promoted to the Jacksonville Jumbo Shrimp during the year.

Pitching for Jacksonville in 2025, Pushard worked to incorporate a sweeper. On June 27, 2025, Pushard, Anderson Pilar, Christian Roa, and George Soriano threw a combined no-hitter against the Nashville Sounds.

=== St. Louis Cardinals ===
On December 10, 2025, the St. Louis Cardinals selected Pushard from the Marlins in the Rule 5 draft. Pushard made the team's Opening Day roster. He made his major league debut on March 29, pitching one inning and giving up three runs against the Tampa Bay Rays. The Cardinals placed Pushard on the 15-day injured list on March 31 due to patellar tendinitis in his right knee and activated him on May 16. After pitching to a 5.14 ERA in six appearances for St. Louis, Pushard was designated for assignment by the team on May 31.

=== Miami Marlins (second stint) ===
On June 3, 2026, Pushard was returned to the Miami Marlins organization. In 28 games (1 start) with Triple-A Jacksonville Jumbo Shrimp he threw 40.1 innings going 2-2 with a 3.12 ERA with 42 strikeouts.

== See also ==
- Rule 5 draft results
