= Brewer Community School =

Primary school in Brewer, Maine, United States

Coordinates: 44°46′34″N 68°46′15″W

- Brewer, Penobscot County, Maine; United States

Information
- School type: Primary school
- Grades: PreK-8
- Capacity: 1,050
- Classrooms: 71
- Area: 156,000 sq ft

The Brewer Community School is a K-8 school in Brewer, Maine, United States and is the largest primary school in the state. It replaces the five elementary and middle schools in the city, which were built as early as the 1920s.

Its 156,000 sq ft (14,500 m^{2}) area contains 71 classrooms for up to 1,050 pre-K through 8th-grade students. Each of its five wings, representing parts of Brewer's history, contains two grade levels. The design of each wing is based on its theme. The desk chairs in the River wing are blue; the ceiling in the Ice wing is jagged.

There are three playgrounds on the campus, all of which are ADA-compliant. The school includes a 488-seat performing arts center.

The entire campus was built for approximately $33.4 million. Brewer residents authorized the school in 2007, with 85% of the voters in favor. The school was built on the grounds of the Pendleton Street School, which had previously been condemned.

Green design was prominent in the construction. The air circulation recycles heat when possible, and specially-shaped windows, skylights, and solar tubes minimize the use of artificial lighting. Leftover food from the cafeteria will be composted on-site.

The school's name was chosen by the Brewer School District Trustees at a meeting on September 1, 2010.
