= Christian Roa =

American baseball player (born 1999)

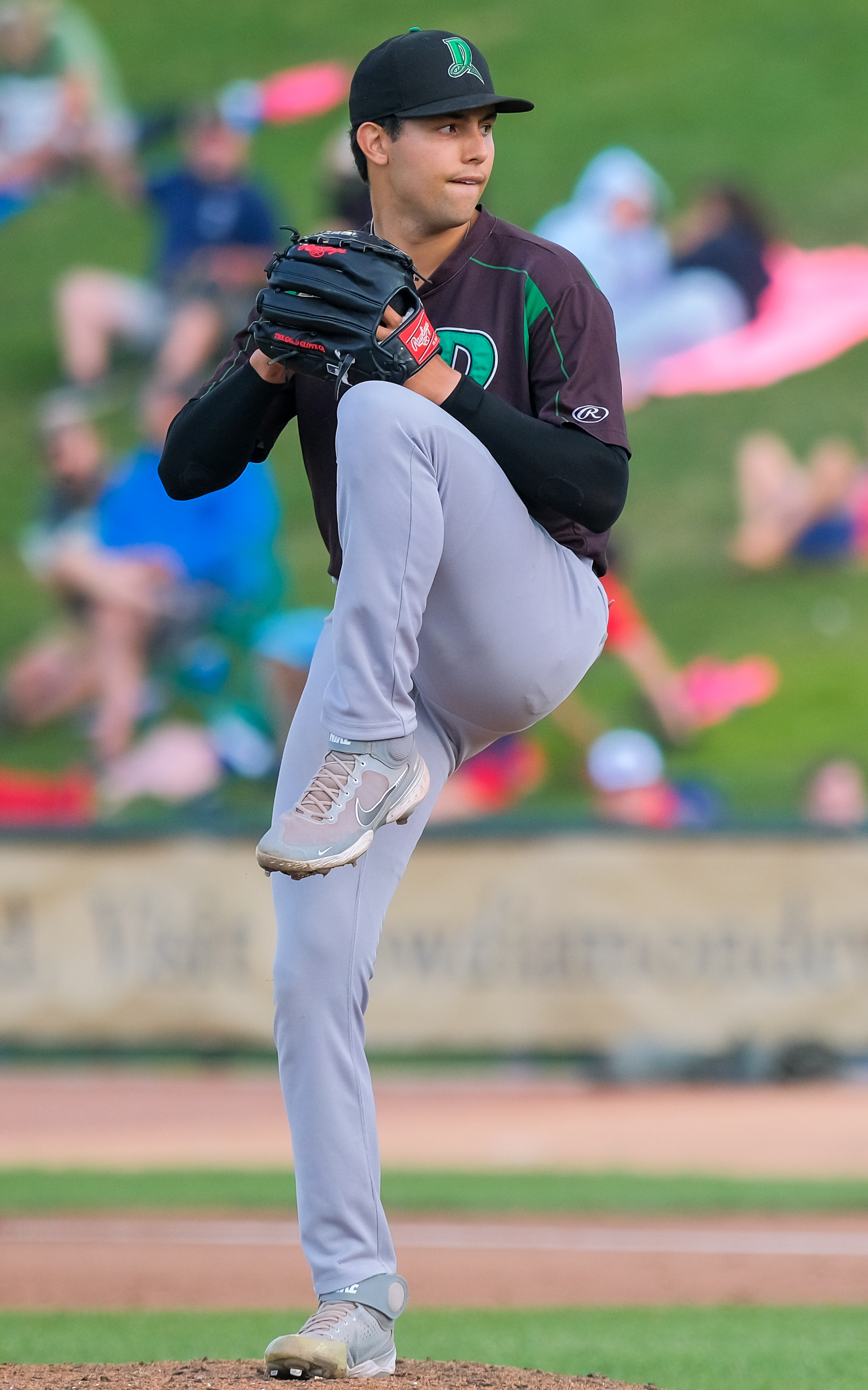
- Roa with the Dayton Dragons in 2022

Free agent
- Pitcher
- Born: April 2, 1999 (age 27); Houston, Texas, U.S.
- Bats: Right Throws: Right

MLB debut
- September 6, 2025, for the Miami Marlins

MLB statistics (through 2026 season)
- Win–loss record: 0–1
- Earned run average: 3.86
- Strikeouts: 9
- Stats at Baseball Reference

Teams
- Miami Marlins (2025); Houston Astros (2026)

Christian Michael Roa (born April 2, 1999) is an American professional baseball pitcher who is a free agent. He has previously played in Major League Baseball (MLB) for the Miami Marlins and Houston Astros.

== Amateur career ==
Roa attended Memorial High School in Houston, Texas. He played both baseball and football. Undrafted in the 2017 Major League Baseball draft, he enrolled at Texas A&M University where he played college baseball for the Aggies.

In 2018, Roa's freshman season, he pitched in 14 games (with one start), pitching to a 4.30 ERA with 12 strikeouts over 14 2/3 innings. That summer, he played in the Northwoods League for the La Crosse Loggers. As a sophomore in 2019, he appeared in 17 games (making ten starts), going 3–2 with a 3.56 ERA and 46 strikeouts over 48 innings. On March 19, 2019, he was named the SEC Pitcher of the Week after throwing seven scoreless innings against the second ranked Vanderbilt Commodores. In 2020, Roa returned to the Aggies starting rotation. He started four games, pitching to a 2–1 record and a 5.85 ERA over twenty innings before the season was ended early due to the COVID-19 pandemic.

== Professional career ==
=== Cincinnati Reds ===
The Cincinnati Reds selected Roa in the second round with the 48th overall pick in the 2020 MLB draft. He signed with the Reds for $1.5 million. He did not play a minor league game in 2020 due to the cancellation of the minor league season caused by the pandemic. To begin the 2021 season, he was assigned to the Daytona Tortugas of the Low-A Southeast. He was placed on the injured list in May with a right elbow flexor mass strain, and did not return to play until mid-July. In early August, he was promoted to the Dayton Dragons of the High-A Central. Over 15 games (13 starts) between the two clubs, Roa went 4–3 with a 3.53 ERA and 67 strikeouts over 58 2/3 innings. He opened the 2022 season on the injured list, but was activated in early May and assigned to Dayton. In late August, he was promoted to the Chattanooga Lookouts of the Double-A Southern League. Over twenty starts between both teams, Roa went 6–3 with a 3.56 ERA and 102 strikeouts over ninety innings. He was selected to play in the Arizona Fall League for the Glendale Desert Dogs after the season.

On November 14, 2022, the Reds added Roa to their 40-man roster to protect him from the Rule 5 draft. Roa opened the 2023 season with Chattanooga and was promoted to the Louisville Bats of the Triple-A International League during the season. Over 28 games (25 starts) between the two affiliates, he went 5–9 with a 5.16 ERA and 170 strikeouts over 120 1/3 innings. Roa was optioned to Louisville to begin the 2024 season. In 23 games for Louisville, he compiled a 4–5 record and 5.55 ERA with 47 strikeouts over 48 2/3 innings pitched. On August 19, 2024, Roa was placed on the 60-day injured list with a right shoulder sprain.

=== Miami Marlins ===
On November 1, 2024, Roa was claimed off waivers by the Miami Marlins. He was removed from the 40-man roster and sent outright to the Triple-A Jacksonville Jumbo Shrimp on November 15. On June 27, 2025, Roa, Matt Pushard, Anderson Pilar, and George Soriano threw a combined no-hitter against the Nashville Sounds. In 47 relief appearances for Jacksonville, Roa compiled a 9–2 record and 2.83 ERA with 61 strikeouts and two saves across 57 1/3 innings pitched. On September 6, Roa was promoted to the major leagues for the first time. He debuted the same day against the Philadelphia Phillies, pitching two innings, recording one walk and three strikeouts. Roa was optioned back to Triple-A Jacksonville on September 8. On November 6, Roa was removed from the 40-man roster and sent outright to Jacksonville. He elected free agency the following day.

=== Houston Astros ===
On December 20, 2025, Roa signed a minor league contract with the Houston Astros. On March 25, 2026, the Astros selected Roa's contract after he made the team's Opening Day roster. He made seven appearances for Houston, posting an 0-1 record and 5.19 ERA with six strikeouts across 8 2/3 innings pitched. On April 21, Roa was designated for assignment by the Astros.

=== Minnesota Twins ===
On April 23, 2026, Roa was claimed off of waivers by the Minnesota Twins. He made three appearances for the Triple-A St. Paul Saints, struggling to a 7.71 ERA with three strikeouts across 2 1/3 innings pitched. On May 6, Roa was designated for assignment by the Twins.

=== Baltimore Orioles ===
On May 10, 2026, Roa was claimed off of waivers by the Baltimore Orioles, who subsequently optioned him to the Triple-A Norfolk Tides. He made one appearance for Norfolk, allowing four runs on five hits across 1/3 of an inning. On May 15, Roa was designated for assignment by the Orioles following the acquisition of Eduarniel Núñez.

=== Chicago Cubs ===
On May 17, 2026, Roa was claimed off of waivers by the Chicago Cubs. He made 10 appearances for the Triple-A Iowa Cubs, posting a 1–0 record and 7.71 ERA with 20 strikeouts and two saves across 11 2/3 innings pitched. Roa was designated for assignment by the Cubs on June 24. He elected free agency after clearing waivers on July 1.

=== Houston Astros (second stint) ===
On July 3, 2026, Roa signed a minor league contract with the Houston Astros. He elected free agency on November 2.
