= Brewer, Maine =

City in Maine, United States

- City
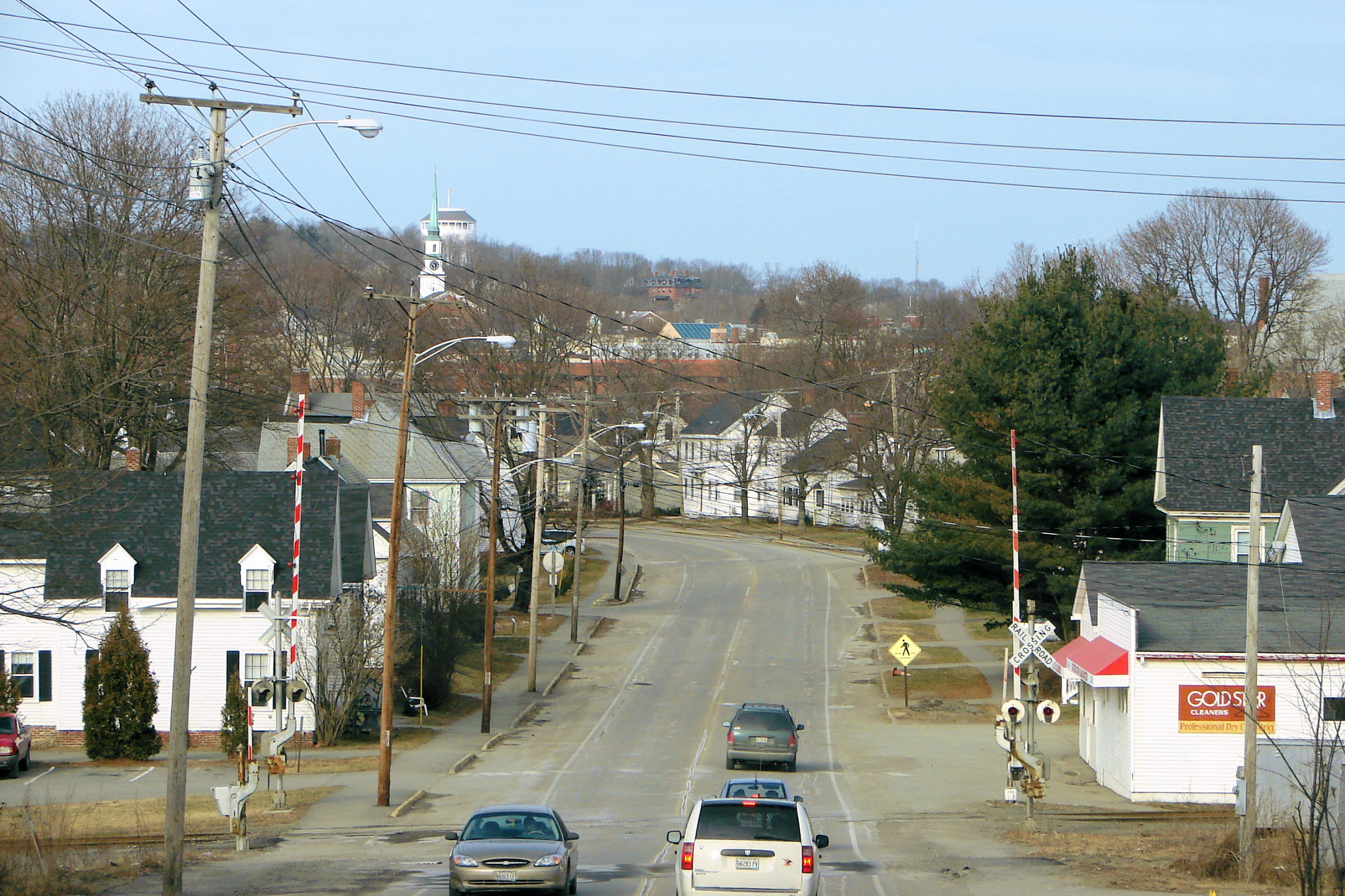
- Wilson Street, Brewer, Maine

- Seal Logo
- Motto: "A Community of Caring"
- Location within the state of Maine
- Coordinates: 44°46′38″N 68°44′48″W
- Country: United States
- State: Maine
- County: Penobscot
- Settled: 1777
- Incorporated (town): February 22, 1812
- Incorporated (city): March 30, 1889

Government
  - Type: Mayor-council government
  - Mayor: Michele LaBree Daniels (2020–2022,2024-2025)
  - City Manager: Eric Glidden

Area
  - Total: 15.68 sq mi (40.62 km^{2})
  - Land: 15.24 sq mi (39.47 km^{2})
  - Water: 0.45 sq mi (1.16 km^{2}) 2.87%
- Elevation: 121 ft (37 m)

Population (2020)
  - Total: 9,672
  - Density: 634.7/sq mi (245.07/km^{2})
- Time zone: UTC−5 (EST)
  - Summer (DST): UTC−4 (EDT)
- ZIP Code: 04412
- Area code: 207
- FIPS code: 23-06925
- GNIS feature ID: 582366
- Website: www.brewermaine.gov

Brewer is a city in Penobscot County, Maine, United States. It is part of the Bangor metropolitan area. The city is named after its first settler, Colonel John Brewer. The population was 9,672 at the 2020 census.

Brewer is the sister city of Bangor. The two are at the head of navigation on opposite sides of the Penobscot River estuary and are connected by three bridges. Brewer and Bangor were originally both part of Condeskeag Plantation, though the Brewer part was also called "New Worcester" after John Brewer's birthplace. In 1788, Orrington, Maine was incorporated with Brewer/New Worcester as its major village. The other half of Kenduskeag incorporated in 1791 as Bangor. Finally, in 1812, Brewer broke away from Orrington and incorporated as a separate town.

== Geography ==
According to the United States Census Bureau, the city has a total area of 15.68 square miles (40.61 km^{2}), of which 15.23 square miles (39.45 km^{2}) is land and 0.45 square miles (1.17 km^{2}) is water.

The villages of South Brewer and North Brewer are both within city limits. South Brewer was formerly the city's major industrial area.

=== Climate ===
This climatic region is typified by large seasonal temperature differences, with warm to hot (and often humid) summers and cold (sometimes severely cold) winters. According to the Köppen Climate Classification system, Brewer has a humid continental climate, abbreviated "Dfb" on climate maps.

== Education ==
- Brewer Community School
- Brewer High School

== Historic buildings ==
The Victorian-style Daniel Sargent House (1847 and later) in South Brewer is listed on the National Register of Historic Places. Sargent was the owner of a large South Brewer sawmill. During the Civil War, he commanded the company of "Tigers" (Penobscot River Drivers) in the 2nd Maine Volunteer Infantry Regiment, also called "The Bangor Regiment". This was the first unit to march out of the state in 1861, and participated in 11 battles over two years. Sargent was eventually promoted to Lt. Col., or second in-command of the regiment.

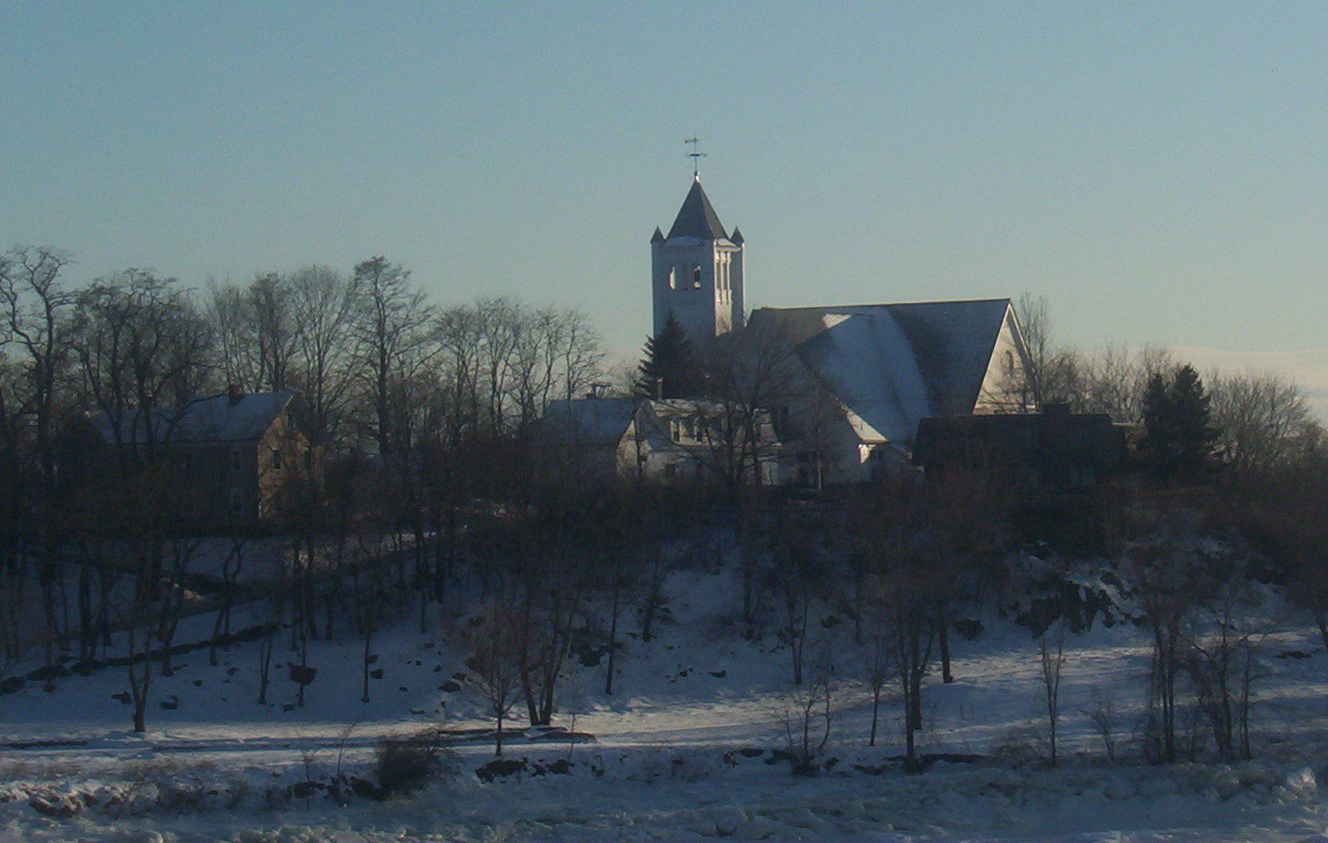
First Congregational Church

The city's most imposing architectural landmark is the shingle style First Congregational Church, which stands on a bluff above the river overlooking Bangor.

== Historic industries ==
Brewer was as famous for brick-making in the 19th century as Bangor was for lumber. By the 1850s, there were 12–15 brickyards in Brewer making 12 million bricks annually. Most of these were shipped to Boston and vicinity. It is said that most of the Back Bay and South End neighborhoods of Boston are built of Brewer brick. Frank O. Farrington of Brewer patented a machine for edging and turning bricks in 1859.

Ship-building was also a major Brewer industry, as was saw-milling. Brewer's sawmills tended to be steam-powered, unlike those farther up the Penobscot River, which were powered by waterfalls. In the late 19th and early 20th centuries, the city also had a significant ice industry, which survives today in the form of the Getchell Brothers company.

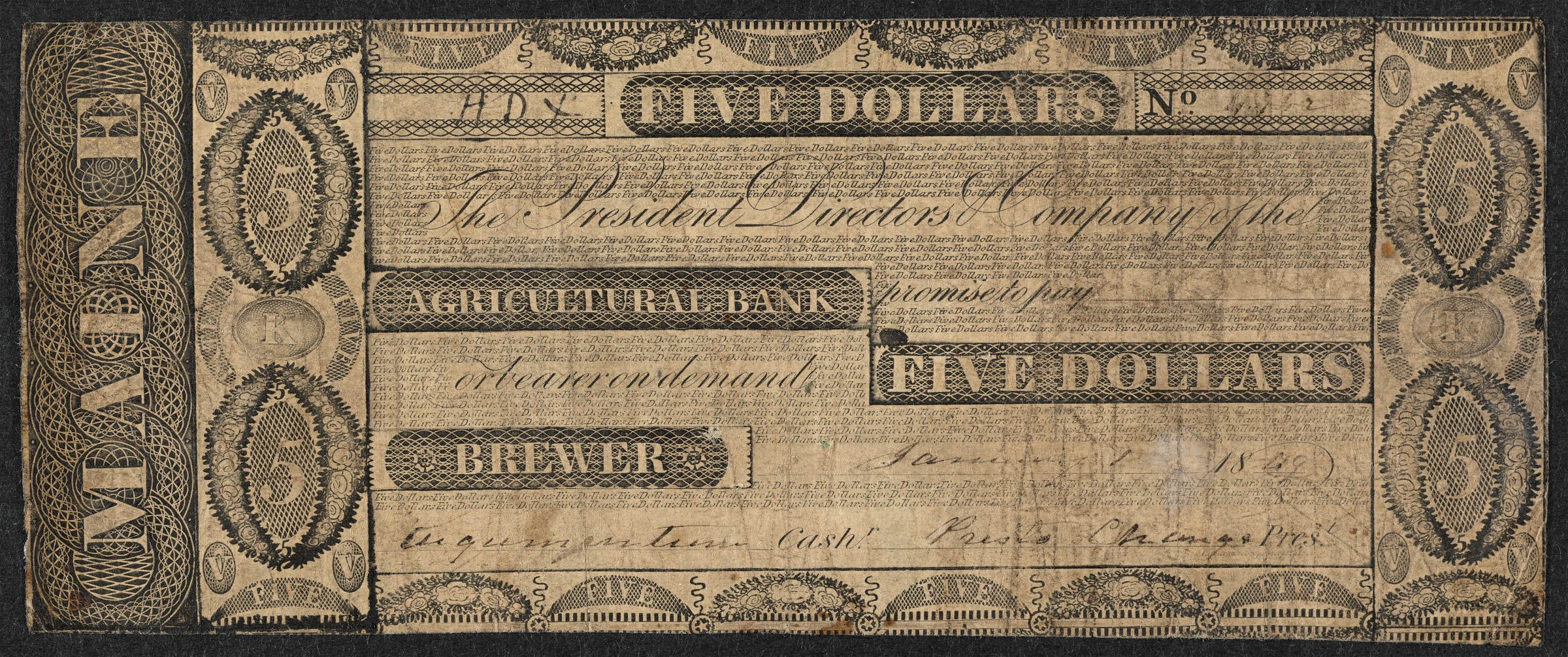
5 dollar banknote from Agricultural bank in Brewer

The Eastern Manufacturing Company opened a pulp and paper mill in South Brewer in 1889 that became the city's largest employer. The mill closed in 2004, and the site has now been re-developed by the Cianbro Corporation. The Eastern began as a sawmill owned by Fred W. Ayer, who in the late 1880s began experimenting with paper-making (using the newly developed sulfite process) in order to utilize his left-over slab lumber. In 1899, Ayer patented a new method of sulfite digestion which subsequently became the basis for operations at the Eastern, as well as the Great Northern mill in Millinocket, Maine, thus circumventing an important patent owned by the competing International Paper Corporation. "The Eastern", as the mill was known locally, began specializing in fine grades of paper around 1905 (such as their trademark "Atlantic Bond"), and the company was eventually renamed Eastern Fine Paper, Inc..

== Notable events ==
In 1900, Dione Polliot, a 17-year-old French-Canadian girl, won $10 (over $200 today) for being the first person to climb to the top of the 173-foot chimney of the Eastern Manufacturing Company. The company had a standing offer of $5 to the first boy who made it to the top, but all had turned back half-way. The bet was spontaneously doubled when Polliot took the dare. The feat was reported in The New York Times, which called Polliot "not only the prettiest girl in South Brewer, but the pluckiest".

In the early hours of August 29, 1903, bank robbers broke into the Brewer Savings Bank using dynamite. They took $300 from the vault (most of the money having been removed beforehand) and retreated across the bridge to Bangor firing their guns at people in Brewer and police on the Bangor side. Despite mobilizing the entire Bangor police force in pursuit, they escaped capture.

On June 12, 1906, four Brewer High School students drowned while sailing at Brewer Lake. On hearing the news, a woman in nearby Old Town went into a trance and reportedly identified the location of the bodies with some accuracy, though they were recovered before her information arrived at the lake. The incident was later reported in the Journal of the American Society for Psychical Research. Graduation ceremonies were canceled and 1,000 people attended the funeral.

In January 2019, a photographer conducting a First Amendment Audit was criminally trespassed from City Hall after video recording the public lobby. This prompted calls from across the country to various city offices inquiring into the event.

== Notable people ==
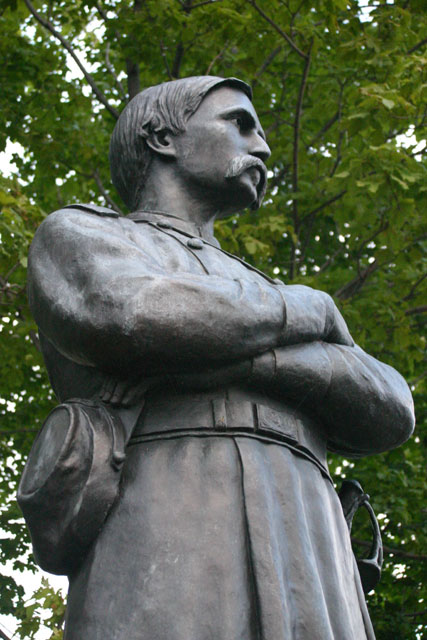
Chamberlain Memorial in Brewer

- Gen. John Blake, U.S. Army officer, led militia in the Battle of Hampden (1814) during the War of 1812
- Joseph E. Brooks, member of the Maine House of Representatives and journalist
- Maj. Gen. Joshua Chamberlain, educator, Civil War hero and 32nd governor of Maine
- Sean Danielsen, lead vocalist and guitarist of the band Smile Empty Soul
- Howie Day, singer-musician, raised in Brewer, graduated from Brewer High School (1999)
- Charles Fletcher Dole, influential Unitarian minister, speaker and writer
- Fannie Hardy Eckstorm, author, ornithologist, folklorist and researcher on psychic phenomena
- Oliver C. Farrington, noted geologist and meteorite expert at the Field Museum of Natural History in Chicago
- Kenneth P. MacLeod, President of the Maine Senate
- Stephanie Lynne Niznik, was an American film, television, and theatre actress.
- William E. Quinby, editor of the Detroit Free Press, United States Ambassador to the Netherlands
- Ambureen Rana, Maine state representative

== Demographics ==
Historical population
Census	Pop.	Note	%±
1820	744		—
1830	1,078		44.9%
1840	1,736		61.0%
1850	2,628		51.4%
1860	2,835		7.9%
1870	3,214		13.4%
1880	3,170		−1.4%
1890	4,193		32.3%
1900	4,835		15.3%
1910	5,667		17.2%
1920	6,064		7.0%
1930	6,329		4.4%
1940	6,510		2.9%
1950	6,862		5.4%
1960	9,009		31.3%
1970	9,300		3.2%
1980	9,017		−3.0%
1990	9,021		0.0%
2000	8,987		−0.4%
2010	9,482		5.5%
2020	9,672		2.0%

=== 2020 census ===
As of the 2020 census, Brewer had a population of 9,672. The median age was 42.7 years. 19.9% of residents were under the age of 18 and 20.8% of residents were 65 years of age or older. For every 100 females there were 90.3 males, and for every 100 females age 18 and over there were 87.0 males age 18 and over.

81.3% of residents lived in urban areas, while 18.7% lived in rural areas.

There were 4,224 households in Brewer, of which 25.3% had children under the age of 18 living in them. Of all households, 42.0% were married-couple households, 18.6% were households with a male householder and no spouse or partner present, and 30.1% were households with a female householder and no spouse or partner present. About 33.9% of all households were made up of individuals and 13.7% had someone living alone who was 65 years of age or older.

There were 4,511 housing units, of which 6.4% were vacant. The homeowner vacancy rate was 1.3% and the rental vacancy rate was 4.6%.

Racial composition as of the 2020 census
Race	Number	Percent
White	8,799	91.0%
Black or African American	105	1.1%
American Indian and Alaska Native	62	0.6%
Asian	138	1.4%
Native Hawaiian and Other Pacific Islander	4	0.0%
Some other race	52	0.5%
Two or more races	512	5.3%
Hispanic or Latino (of any race)	232	2.4%

=== 2010 census ===
As of the census of 2010, there were 9,482 people, 4,163 households, and 2,448 families living in the city. The population density was 622.6 inhabitants per square mile (240.4/km^{2}). There were 4,457 housing units at an average density of 292.6 per square mile (113.0/km^{2}). The racial makeup of the city was 95.4% White, 0.7% African American, 0.8% Native American, 1.0% Asian, 0.3% from other races, and 1.8% from two or more races. Hispanic or Latino of any race were 1.2% of the population.

There were 4,163 households, of which 27.1% had children under the age of 18 living with them, 43.3% were married couples living together, 11.2% had a female householder with no husband present, 4.2% had a male householder with no wife present, and 41.2% were non-families. 31.8% of all households were made up of individuals, and 13.1% had someone living alone who was 65 years of age or older. The average household size was 2.25 and the average family size was 2.81.

The median age in the city was 41.1 years. 20.2% of residents were under the age of 18; 8.9% were between the ages of 18 and 24; 26.2% were from 25 to 44; 27.6% were from 45 to 64; and 17.1% were 65 years of age or older. The gender makeup of the city was 47.1% male and 52.9% female.

=== 2000 census ===
At the 2000 census, there were 8,987 people, 3,842 households and 2,401 families living in the city. The population density was 595.3 inhabitants per square mile (229.8/km^{2}). There were 4,064 housing units at an average density of 269.2 per square mile (103.9/km^{2}). The racial makeup of the city was 97.63% White, 0.33% African American, 0.63% Native American, 0.55% Asian, 0.02% Pacific Islander, 0.23% from other races, and 0.60% from two or more races. Hispanic or Latino of any race were 0.63% of the population.

There were 3,842 households, of which 29.1% had children under the age of 18 living with them, 48.5% were married couples living together, 11.0% had a female householder with no husband present, and 37.5% were non-families. 29.3% of all households were made up of individuals, and 12.2% had someone living alone who was 65 years of age or older. The average household size was 2.30 and the average family size was 2.86.

22.4% of the population were under the age of 18, 7.6% from 18 to 24, 30.4% from 25 to 44, 23.0% from 45 to 64, and 16.7% who were 65 years of age or older. The median age was 39 years. For every 100 females, there were 91.2 males. For every 100 females age 18 and over, there were 86.1 males.

The median household income was $36,949 and the median family income was $46,632. Males had a median income of $35,016 compared with $26,850 for females. The per capita income for the city was $20,158. About 8.6% of families and 10.5% of the population were below the poverty line, including 13.3% of those under age 18 and 9.2% of those age 65 or over.
