= Peter Goutiere =

- Peter Goutiere, in 1944, wearing his CNAC uniform
- Born: Peter Joffre de Goutiere; September 28, 1914; Aligarh, Uttar Pradesh, India
- Died: January 22, 2023 (aged 108); Katonah, New York, U.S.
- Occupation: Pilot
- Spouse(s): Helen Elizabeth Brimmer (1939–1947); Dorothy Wetzel (1947); Evelyn S. Goutiere (1987–2023)
- Children: Three
- Parents: George Henry de Goutiere (father); Alice Wintel (mother)
- Relatives: Christine Goutiere Weston (sister)

Peter Joffre Goutiere (September 28, 1914 – January 22, 2023) was an American pilot who flew in North America, Africa, Asia, Europe and the Middle East. He flew over the Himalayas during World War 2, out of Shanghai during the Chinese Civil War, and out of Beirut until the Lebanese Civil War. He was a prolific public speaker, an author, and a centenarian.

== Early life ==
George Henry de Goutiere, Peter's father, in 1907

Peter Goutiere was born in Aligarh, Uttar Pradesh, India in 1914, the son of British father and American mother. He attended the American Methodist school in Kumaon Lake District. Goutiere's father was head of the English police service, while his mother later taught French.

His father died when he was a child; At 14, he was sent to live with a sister and her husband in Maine. In 1930, he tied for first place in an archery tournament.

In 1938, while a senior at Brewer High School in Bangor, Goutiere spoke on his life in India. He was elected vice-president of the senior class. He was active in drama. He graduated in 1939 and gave the school a $50 gift for a scholarship. In August, at age 24, he married Helen Elizabeth Brimmer, his high school's English teacher and drama coach. The couple had one child, David Peter, before divorcing in January 1947.

In 1940, he was part of a five-man team that won a state Skeet Shooting competition. In 1941, he was a participant in a flying club. In September 1941, he reported a fellow flier missing after they were separated in fog; his companion landed safely.

== Career ==
After the attack on Pearl Harbor, Goutiere attempted to join the Army Air Corps, only to learn that at age 27, he was too old to enlist to fight in World War 2.

In 1942, he worked for Pan Am in Africa. From 1943 to 1948, he worked for the China National Aviation Corporation flying over the Himalayas -- a route know as The Hump. Goutiere flew the route 680 times. In 1944, Goutiere was profiled for his wartime work helping transport supplies into China from India. He spoke at Bangor High School about his experience flying over the Himalayas for the Army Air Corps.

In 1947, he was operating out of Shanghai when his wife Helen was granted a divorce. He then had a brief marriage to Dorothy Wetzel, who decades later found notoriety for her role in the Watergate scandal after her marriage to CIA agent E. Howard Hunt.

Returning to the US, he flew for National Airlines out of Miami. From 1955 to 1961, he worked in the Middle East for Air Liban and flew out of a base in Beirut, Lebanon. In 1962, he was working for Ghana Airways.

He ended his career as a Federal Aviation Administration inspector, retiring in 1990 at age 76.

== Later life ==
External media
- 2015 interview with Goutiere
- Part two of 2015 interview
- Himalayan Rogue Returns by Peter J. Goutiere

In 1995, he authored Himalayan Rogue, a book about his life. He was active in "Suncoast Basha of the China-Burma-India Association". In 2005, he was featured in an article about former CIA pilots who sought to get service benefits from the agency. In 1999, a local veterans group named him "Person of the Year". In 2008, he traveled to Tibet. In 2014, Goutiere was profiled when he was re-united with an aircraft he had flown during World War 2.

According to a 2020 profile, Goutiere was reportedly associated with Hussein bin Talal, king of Jordan, and Man Singh II, Maharaja of Jaipur. According to a 2023 posthumous profile, Goutiere was a personal pilot for Chiang Kai-shek and briefly a suspect in an attempted assassination of Libyan leader Muammar Gaddafi.

== Family and death ==
Peter Goutiere died in 2023. He married four times, and was survived by wife Eveyln. In 1962, his mother Alicia died. In 1989, Goutiere was interviewed upon the death of his sister, Christine Westone, a novelist whose works were generally set in India. In 1945, she authored a book dedicated to her nephew David Peter Goutiere. In 1999, his brother Vernon died. In 2000, sister Geraldine died. In 2007, press related a story of his father and a family heir loom of a silver bowl.
