= Brewer High School (Maine) =

Location
- 79 Parkway South; Brewer, Maine 04412; United States; 44.7816°N 68.7560°W

Information
- Type: Public high school
- School district: Brewer School Department
- Principal: Brent Slowikowski
- Staff: 47.70 (FTE)
- Grades: 9-12
- Enrollment: 704 (2023–2024)
- Student to teacher ratio: 14.85
- Colors: Orange and black
- Athletics conference: KVAC/PVC
- Mascot: Brewer Witch
- Nickname: Witches
- Yearbook: Trident
- Website: www.brewerhs.org

Brewer High School is a public high school in Brewer, Maine, United States. The school uses the Penobscot Ice Arena.

== Notable alumni ==
- Richard H. Campbell, state legislator
- Howie Day, singer-songwriter
- Peter Goutiere, pilot
- Matt Pushard, baseball player
