= Cicero race riot of 1951 =

Race riot in Cicero, Illinois

- Date: July 11 – 12, 1951
- Location: Cicero, Illinois
- Caused by: Racism in response to desegregation
- Methods: Arson
- Result: $20,000 in damages

Parties
White rioters	Cicero Police Department

Number
4,000	60

The Cicero race riot of 1951 occurred July 11–12, when a mob of 4,000 whites attacked an apartment building that housed a single black family in a neighborhood in Cicero, Illinois.

== Background ==
The aftermath of World War II saw a revival of white attacks on blacks in the Chicago area, mostly on the city's South and Southwest Sides, but also in the western industrial suburb of Cicero. Aspiring African-American professionals seeking to obtain improved housing beyond the increasingly overcrowded South Side ghetto, whether in private residences or in the new public housing developments constructed by the Chicago Housing Authority, were frequently greeted by attempted arsons, bombings, and angry white mobs often numbering into the thousands.

== Backdrop ==
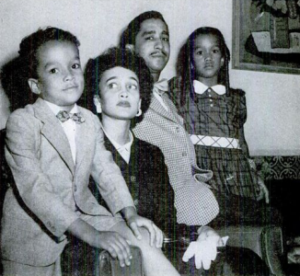
The Clark family

In early June 1951, Mrs. DeRose, who owned an apartment building at 6139–43 W. 19th Street in Cicero, got into a controversy with her tenants and was ordered to refund a portion of the rent. Afterwards, out of anger and/or profit, she rented an apartment to Harvey E. Clark Jr., an African-American World War II veteran and graduate of Fisk University, and his family in an all-white neighborhood. A high-ranking Cicero official learned that an African-American family was moving into a Cicero apartment and warned Mrs. DeRose that there would be "trouble" if he moved in. At 2:30 pm, on June 8, a moving van containing $2,000 worth of Clark's furniture was stopped by the police. The rental agent was ushered out with a drawn revolver at his back. A jeering crowd gathered and Clark was told by the police to get out or he would be arrested "for protective custody." A detective warned Clark that, "I'll bust your damned head if you don't move." At 6:00 pm, Clark was grabbed by 20 police officers. The chief of police told him, "Get out of here fast. There will be no moving into this building." Clark was hit eight times as he was pushed towards a car which was parked across the street and was shoved inside the car. The police told him, "Get out of Cicero and don't come back in town or you'll get a bullet through you." A suit was filed by the NAACP against the Cicero Police Department on June 26, and the Clark family moved in.

== Riot ==
With the Clarks now living in the apartment, word was passed along that there would be "fun" at the apartment. On July 11, 1951, at dusk, a crowd of 4,000 whites attacked the apartment building that housed the Clark family and their possessions. 60 police officers were assigned to the scene to control the rioting. Women carried stones from a nearby rock pile to bombard the Clarks' windows. Another tossed firebrands onto the window and onto the rooftop of the building which 21 family members fled before the rioting. The mob also destroyed a bathtub, woodworks, plaster, doors, windows, and set fires to the place. Most of the whites who joined in the rioting were teenagers. Firemen who rushed to the building were met with showers of bricks and stones from the mob. Sheriffs' deputies asked the firemen to turn their hoses on the rioters, who refused to do so without their lieutenant, who was unavailable. The situation appeared to be out of control and County Sheriff John E. Babbs asked Illinois Governor Adlai Stevenson to send in the Illinois National Guard. As troops arrived at the scene, the rioters fought with them. Armed with bayonets, rifle butts, and tear gas, the troops ended the riot by setting a 300-meter (328-yard) perimeter around the apartment block in which the rioting was in progress. By July 14, most of the violence had ended. When the riot was over, $20,000 in damage had been done to the building.

== Aftermath ==
The Cook County grand jury failed to indict any of the accused rioters, instead indicting Clark's attorney from the NAACP (George N. Leighton, later a federal judge; his own defense counsel would be future Justice of the Supreme Court Thurgood Marshall), the owner of the apartment building, and the owner's rental agent and lawyer on charges of inciting a riot and conspiracy to damage property. The charges were dropped after widespread criticism.

A federal grand jury then indicted four Cicero officials and three police officers on charges of violating Clark's rights in connection with the race riots after the United States Attorney General launched an investigation of the incident. Charges were dropped against the fire chief, whose firefighters refused to direct their water hoses at the rioters when requested by the police, and the town's president. The police chief and two police officers were fined a total of $2,500 (equivalent to $31,000 in 2025) for violating Clark's civil rights. The federal prosecution was hailed as a courageous achievement, since it was rare that civil rights in housing had stirred action by federal officials.

The Cicero Race Riot of 1951 lasted several nights, involved two- to five thousand white rioters, and received worldwide condemnation. It was the first race riot to be broadcast on local television. Most viewed the rioting in Cicero from their living rooms on TVs before they read it in the papers. The press reports in the 1940s Chicago housing attacks were largely ignored, but when the eruption occurred in Cicero in 1951, it brought worldwide condemnation for the first time and a dramatic climax to an era of large-scale residential change. The black population continued to increase in Chicago despite the incident, and the Chicago Housing Authority reported a decrease in the number of black families requesting police protection. Although the housing assaults did not end, they became less frequent than in the aftermath of World War II.

In an editorial dated July 14, 1951, the Chicago Tribune used their disapproval of rent control to explain why the mob's behavior should be condemned, stating "We think it was wholly indefensible, exactly as we think the similar behavior of the majority [tenants] on rent control is wholly indefensible. When majorities are right, it is not because they are majorities but because they are right. When majorities abuse their strength to impose injustice upon a minority, they are always wrong, whether the victims are an economic, a racial, a religious, or any other kind of minority."

The buildings at the center of the riots are still standing and occupied as of 2017. Harvey E. Clark Jr. died in 1998, aged 75, at his home in Swannanoa, North Carolina.

== See also ==
- List of incidents of civil unrest in the United States
- Michele Clark, a member of the Clark family who gained prominence as a reporter
