= George Soriano =

American baseball player (born 1999)

St. Louis Cardinals – No. 65
- Pitcher
- Born: March 24, 1999 (age 27); San Pedro de Macorís, Dominican Republic
- Bats: Right Throws: Right

MLB debut
- April 16, 2023, for the Miami Marlins

MLB statistics (through 2026 season)
- Win–loss record: 9–6
- Earned run average: 5.33
- Strikeouts: 183
- Stats at Baseball Reference

Teams
- Miami Marlins (2023–2025); St. Louis Cardinals (2026–present)

George Soriano (born March 24, 1999) is a Dominican professional baseball pitcher for the St. Louis Cardinals of Major League Baseball (MLB). He has previously played in MLB for the Miami Marlins. He made his MLB debut in 2023.

== Career ==
=== Miami Marlins ===
Soriano signed with the Miami Marlins as an international free agent on August 19, 2015. He made his professional debut in 2016 with the Dominican Summer League Marlins.

Soriano missed the entire 2017 season due to injury and played with the rookie-level Gulf Coast Marlins in 2018. Pitching in 11 games (and starting 3), he logged a 1.91 ERA with 36 strikeouts in 42 innings of work. He spent the 2019 season with the Single-A Clinton LumberKings, making 23 appearances (20 starts) and posting a 4–7 record and 3.91 ERA with 99 strikeouts in 119 2/3 innings pitched.

Soriano did not play in a game in 2020 due to the cancellation of the minor league season because of the COVID-19 pandemic. He returned to action in 2021 with the Single-A Jupiter Hammerheads and High-A Beloit Snappers, making 18 starts and registering a cumulative 3.43 ERA with 114 strikeouts in 89 1/3 innings of work.

Soriano split the 2022 season between the Double-A Pensacola Blue Wahoos and Triple-A Jacksonville Jumbo Shrimp. In 40 appearances (6 starts), he recorded a 2.72 ERA with 85 strikeouts and eight saves in 76 innings pitched. On November 15, 2022, the Marlins added Soriano to their 40-man roster to protect him from the Rule 5 draft. Soriano was optioned to the Triple-A Jacksonville Jumbo Shrimp to begin the 2023 season.

On April 10, 2023, Soriano was recalled and promoted to the major leagues for the first time after J. T. Chargois was placed on the injured list. He made 26 appearances for the Marlins during his rookie campaign, recording a 3.81 ERA with 52 strikeouts and one save over 52 innings of work.

Soriano pitched in 22 games for the Marlins during the 2024 season, compiling a 1–1 record and 6.75 ERA with 29 strikeouts and one save across 29 1/3 innings pitched.

On June 27, 2025, Soriano, Matt Pushard, Anderson Pilar, and Christian Roa threw a combined no-hitter for Jacksonville against the Nashville Sounds. In 29 appearances for Jacksonville, he posted a 4–1 record and 2.32 ERA with 49 strikeouts and two saves. Soriano also made 24 relief outings for the Marlins, but struggled to an 8.35 ERA with 36 strikeouts and one save over 36 2/3 innings pitched.

=== St. Louis Cardinals ===
On November 5, 2025, Soriano was claimed off waivers by the Baltimore Orioles. He was designated for assignment following the acquisition of Jhonkensy Noel on January 5, 2026. On January 9, Soriano was claimed off waivers by the Atlanta Braves. Following the acquisition of José Suárez, Atlanta designated Soriano for assignment on January 26. On January 30, he was claimed off waivers by the Washington Nationals. Soriano was designated for assignment by the Nationals on February 5. On February 10, Soriano was traded to the St. Louis Cardinals in exchange for Andre Granillo.
