= Michele Clark =

American journalist (1943–1972)

- Clark, c. 1972
- Born: June 2, 1943; Gary, Indiana, U.S.
- Died: December 8, 1972 (aged 29); Chicago, Illinois, U.S.
- Education: Grinnell College; Roosevelt University (BA); Columbia University (MA)
- Occupation: Journalist
- Years active: 1970–1972
- Known for: First African–American woman to serve as a network reporter for CBS Television.
- Notable work: WBBM-TV

Michele E. Clark (June 2, 1943 – December 8, 1972) was an American journalist. Clark was the first African–American woman to serve as a television correspondent for CBS News. As a correspondent at WBBM-TV, Clark covered the 1972 Democratic Party presidential primaries.

Clark died in the December 1972 crash of United Airlines Flight 553 at Chicago's Midway Airport, while investigating the Watergate scandal. Her death has been widely described as cutting short a promising career. Michele Clark Magnet High School in Chicago is named after her.

== Biography ==
=== Early life and education ===
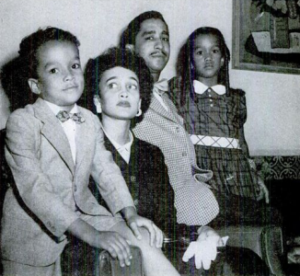
Clark as a child (furthest right), with her family

Clark was born in Gary, Indiana on June 2, 1943. Her parents were Harvey Clark Jr. and Johnetta Clark. They met while attending Fisk University, and her father served in World War II and worked as a bus driver and the manager of an appliance store. Clark had a younger brother, also named Harvey Clark, who became a reporter at WCAU. The family's decision to move into an all-white neighborhood of Cicero, Illinois sparked the Cicero race riot of 1951, of which they were the victims.

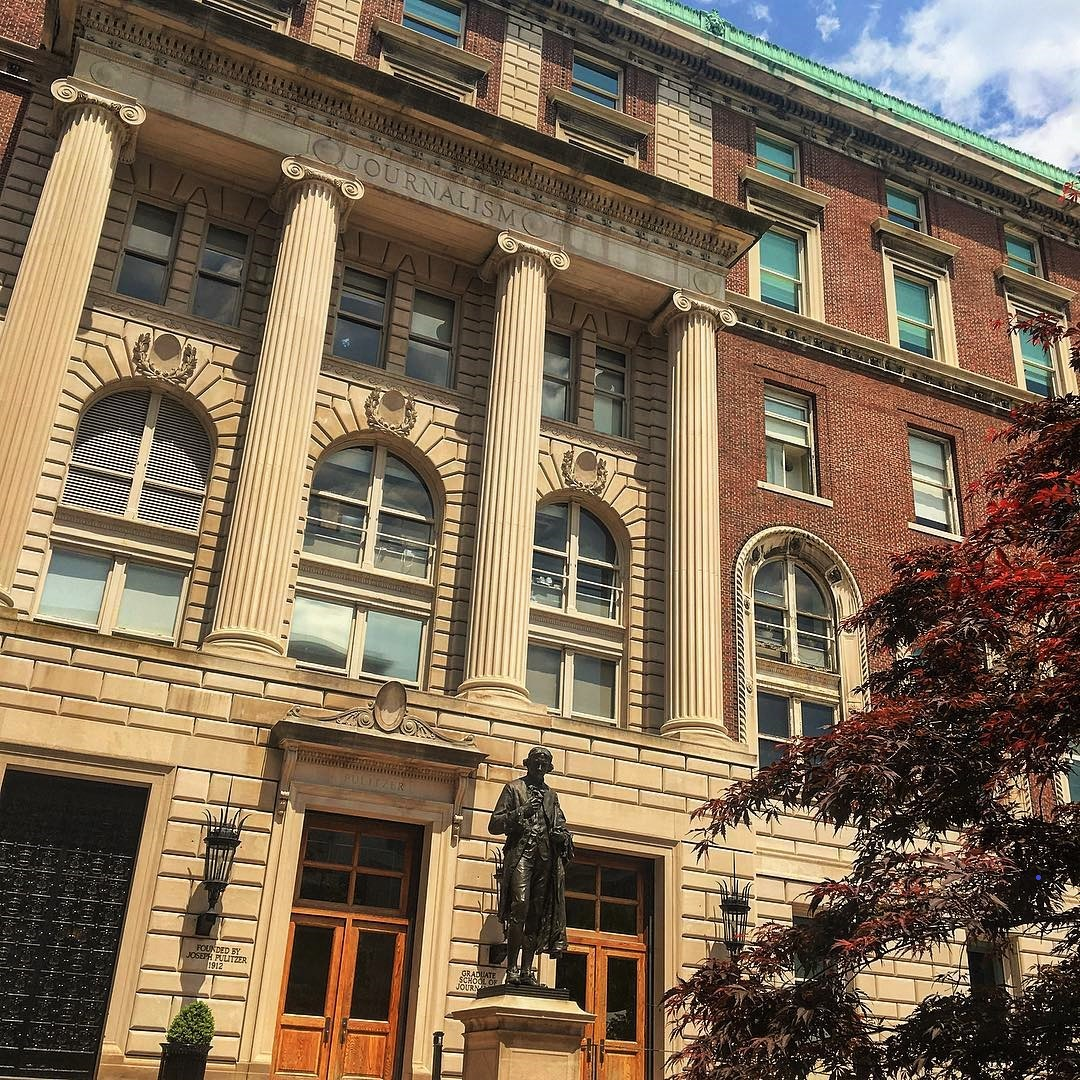
Clark graduated from the Columbia University Graduate School of Journalism, where a summer program she attended was later named after her.

Clark attended the University of Chicago Laboratory Schools, followed by Grinnell College and Roosevelt University. In 1970, Clark graduated from the Summer Program in Journalism for Members of Minority Groups there, and that program was subsequently renamed the Michele Clark Fellowship Program for Minority Journalists. Clark graduated from the Columbia University Graduate School of Journalism in 1972. Prior to the start of her career as a reporter, Clark worked at United Airlines, and as a model.

=== Career ===
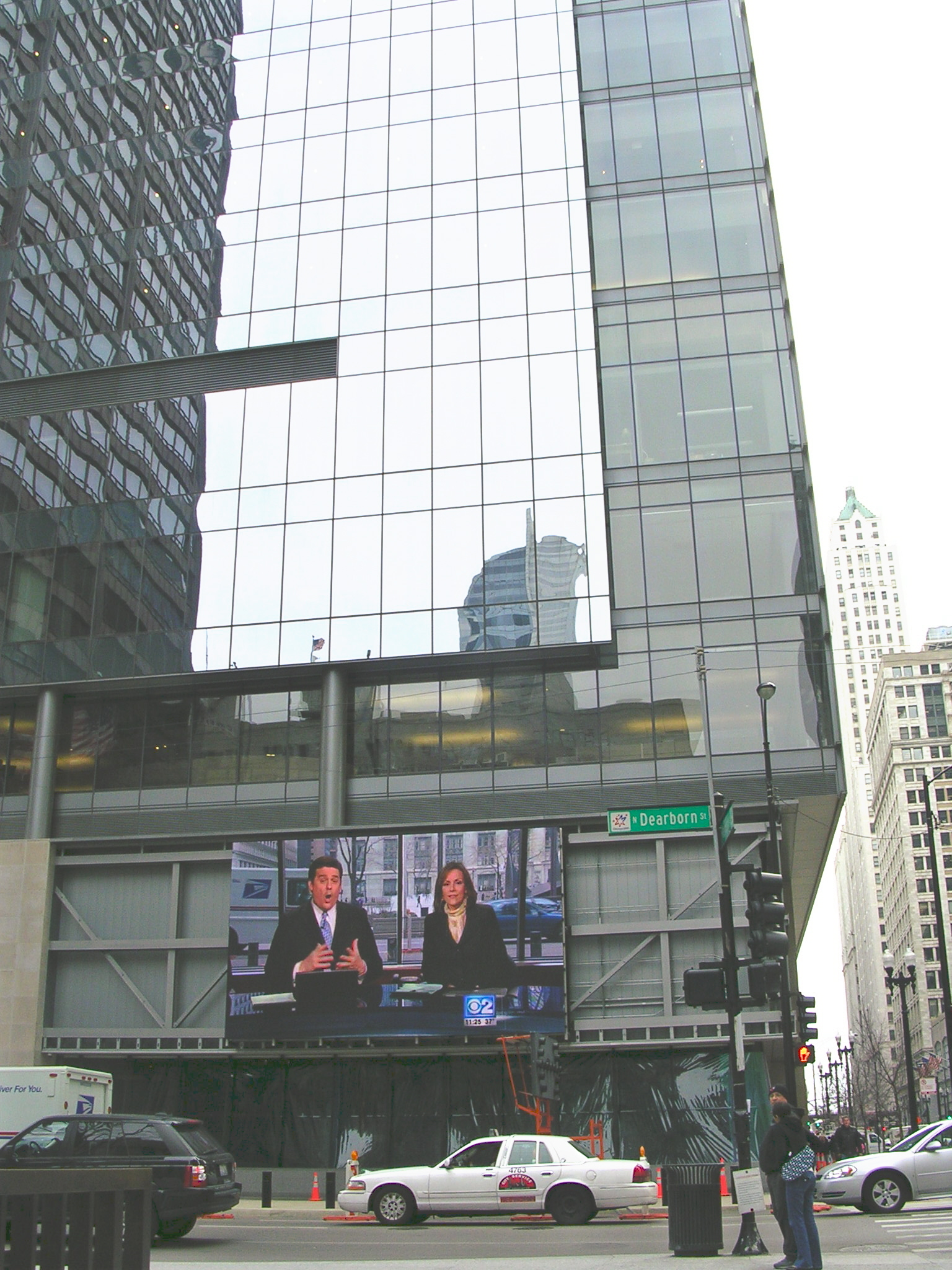
Clark worked for WBBM, a CBS station.

Clark began her journalism career at WBBM-TV, a CBS station in Chicago. She became a CBS News correspondent at a time when few women and few African Americans worked as network correspondents, and was hired at around the same time as three other women: Connie Chung, Lesley Stahl, and Sylvia Chase. Clark was the first Black woman network reporter for CBS Television. Even though she was a new reporter, Clark was assigned to cover the 1972 Democratic Party presidential primaries for CBS. This has been described as her "most prominent assignment". She was slated to become a correspondent on 60 Minutes in 1973.

== Death ==
Clark died on December 8, 1972, at the age of 29, in the crash of United Air Lines Flight 553 at Midway Airport in Chicago. At the time of her death, Clark was working on reporting related to the Watergate scandal, which was still being covered up. This has led to speculation that, if Clark had not died, she might have broken news of the Watergate scandal. Clark's presence on the flight became a feature in conspiracy theories regarding the crash of Flight 553, suggesting that the crash was related to a cover-up of Watergate.

== Recognition and legacy ==
Clark has been identified as a "star" journalist who died at the start of a promising career. Bill Kurtis recalled that at Clark's funeral, CBS executive Richard S. Salant said that Clark's death was "as if Ed Murrow had died at a young age".

Clark is the namesake of Michele Clark Magnet High School, a public magnet high school on the west side of Chicago, Illinois. The school was originally called Austin High School when it opened in 1972, but was renamed in honor of Clark in 1974.

After Clark's death, the summer program that she attended at Columbia University was renamed the Michele Clark Fellowship Program for Minority Journalists, partly in recognition of efforts she had made to keep the program running when it had run low on funds. Clark is also the namesake for the first fellowship of the Radio Television Digital News Association, the Michele Clark Fellowship. She has continued to be memorialized on CBS television.

Clark was portrayed by Prema Cruz in the 2023 HBO miniseries White House Plumbers.
