= United Air Lines Flight 553 =

1972 aviation accident in Illinois

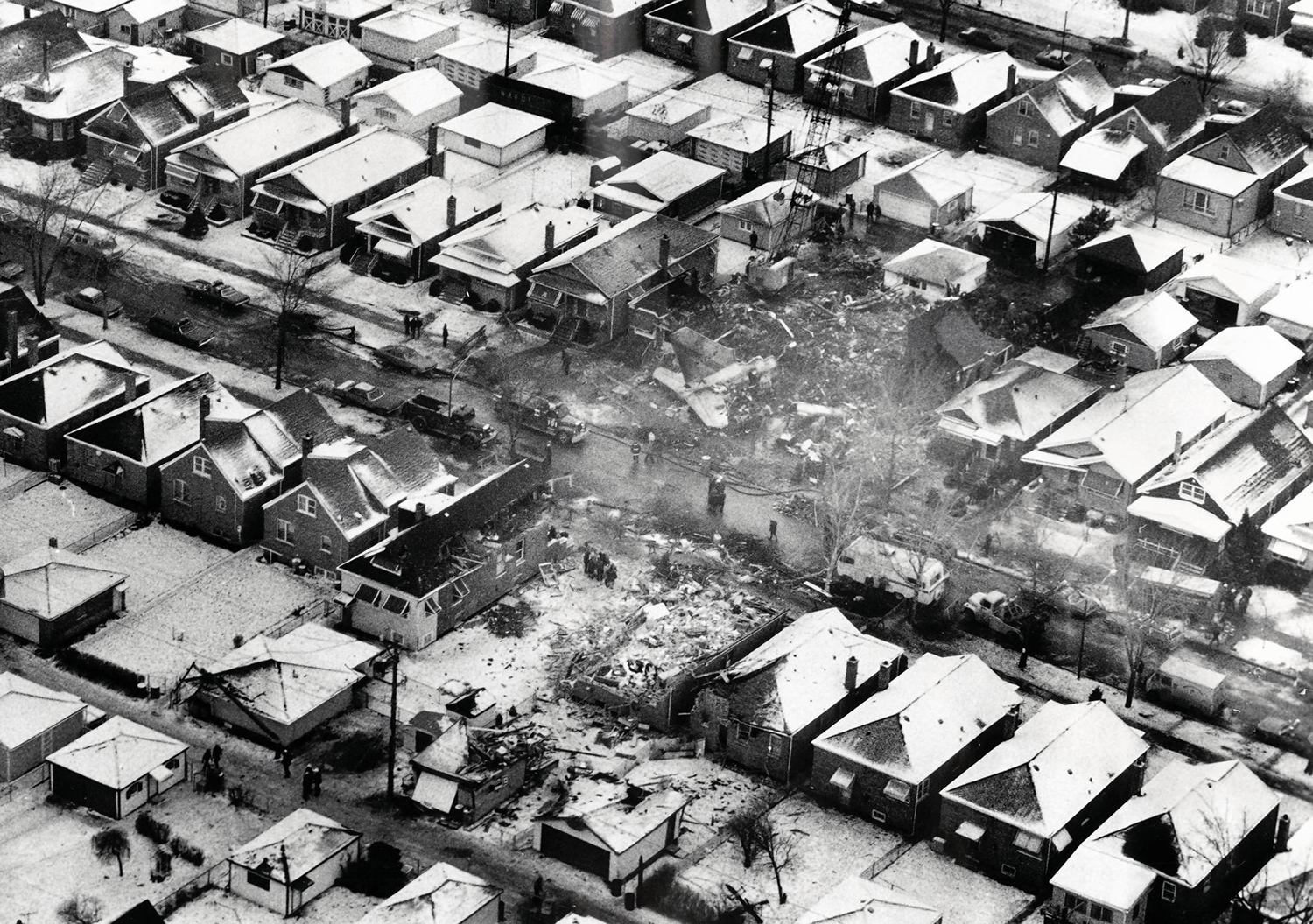
- Aerial view of the crash site

Accident
- Date: December 8, 1972
- Summary: Stall caused by pilot error and bad weather
- Site: West Lawn, Illinois. Southeast of Chicago Midway International Airport, Chicago, Illinois, United States; 41°45′55″N 87°42′58″W
- Total fatalities: 45
- Total injuries: 18

Aircraft
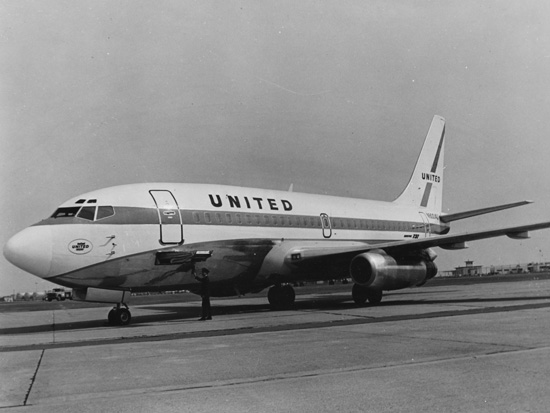
- A United Air Lines Boeing 737-222, similar to the one involved in the accident
- Aircraft type: Boeing 737-222
- Aircraft name: City of Lincoln
- Operator: United Air Lines
- IATA flight No.: UA553
- ICAO flight No.: UAL553
- Call sign: UNITED 553
- Registration: N9031U
- Flight origin: Ronald Reagan Washington National Airport, Washington, D.C., United States
- Stopover: Chicago Midway International Airport Chicago, Illinois, United States
- Destination: Eppley Airfield, Omaha, Nebraska, United States
- Occupants: 61
- Passengers: 55
- Crew: 6
- Fatalities: 43
- Injuries: 16
- Survivors: 18

Ground casualties
- Ground fatalities: 2
- Ground injuries: 2

United Air Lines Flight 553 was a scheduled domestic flight from Ronald Reagan Washington National Airport to Eppley Airfield, via Chicago Midway International Airport. On December 8, 1972, the Boeing 737-200 serving the flight, City of Lincoln registration N9031U, crashed while approaching Midway Airport. The probable cause of the crash was concluded to be the captain's failure to properly manage the flight.

The plane crashed into a residential neighborhood, destroying five houses; there was an intense ground fire. Forty-three of the 61 aboard the aircraft and two on the ground were killed. Among the passengers killed were Illinois congressman George W. Collins, CBS News correspondent Michele Clark and Dorothy Hunt, the wife of Watergate conspirator E. Howard Hunt. The crash was the first fatal accident involving a Boeing 737, which had entered airline service nearly five years earlier in February 1968 and is the second worst plane crash to happen in Midway International Airport, the other being TWA Flight 529.

== Background ==
=== Aircraft ===
United Air Lines Flight 553 was a scheduled service from Ronald Reagan Washington National Airport to Eppley Airfield, via Chicago Midway International Airport. The aircraft used for the flight was a four-year-old Boeing 737-222, City of Lincoln, registration N9031U (built in 1968).

=== Flight crew ===
The flight-deck crew consisted of Captain Wendell Lewis Whitehouse (age 44), First Officer Walter O. Coble (43), and Second Officer Barry J. Elder (31). The captain, a highly experienced pilot with approximately 18,000 flight hours to his credit, had been with the airline since 1956 and had logged more than 2,400 flight hours on the Boeing 737 cockpit. First Officer Coble had more than 10,600 flight hours (including nearly 1,700 hours on the Boeing 737) under his belt and Second Officer Elder had close to 2,700 hours, with nearly 1,200 of them on the Boeing 737.

== Accident ==
The accident occurred as the aircraft was on a northwesterly heading to land on runway 31L at Midway Airport. The area was overcast at the time: a pilot landing on that runway immediately after the accident later reported that the airport was only visible below 500–600 feet (150–180 m) AGL. Flight 553 was on instruments, cleared by air traffic control at 14:24 CST for a nonprecision approach.

The localizer approach for runway 31L used an Outer Marker Beacon (OMB) named "Kedzie", located 3.3 nmi (6.1 km; 3.8 mi) prior to the runway threshold. Under the published landing procedures, the aircraft was to maintain a minimum altitude of 1,500 feet (460 m) until it passed the OMB, at which point the flight was allowed to descend to a minimum descent altitude (MDA) of 1,040 feet (320 m). Published procedures, and pilots operating under instrument flight rules, use mean sea level (MSL) as the point of reference for measuring altitude; at Midway Airport, an altitude of 1,040 feet (320 m) MSL corresponded to an actual height above ground level (AGL) of only 429 feet (131 m).

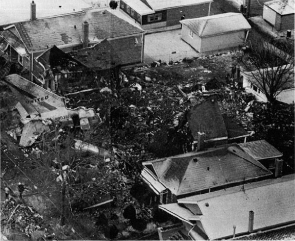
The aftermath of Flight 553

When Flight 553 reached the Kedzie OMB, the aircraft was still at an altitude of 2,200 feet (670 m) MSL, a full 700 feet (210 m) above the minimum crossing altitude of 1,500 feet (460 m) MSL, 1,160 feet (350 m) above the height at which the decision on whether to land must be finalized. Realizing the aircraft was too high, the captain extended the spoilers (speed brakes) and steepened the aircraft's descent rate to 1,550 feet (470 m) per minute (in comparison with the 1,000 feet (300 m) per minute approximate rate specified by United Air Lines for the final segment of a nonprecision approach; typical precision approach descent rates are 600–700 feet (180–210 m) per minute). The aircraft continued to descend at a rate of 1,500 feet (460 m) per minute, emerging from cloud 500 feet (150 m) above the ground, until it reached its level-off altitude at MDA. The captain leveled the plane off and increased engine power, but did not advance the throttles fully. With the spoilers still extended, thrust was not enough to maintain level flight without losing speed. The stick shaker, a stall warning device attached to the pilots' control yoke, activated 6–7 seconds after the aircraft leveled off and continued to sound as the aircraft entered an aerodynamic stall.

The aircraft struck trees and then roofs along W. 71st Street before crashing into a house at 3722 W. 70th Place, 1.89 miles (3.0 km) southeast of the runway, in a residential area of the city's West Lawn community, one and a half blocks west of Marquette Park. (41.7653°N 87.7160°W)

=== Victims ===
The three-person flight-deck crew died, along with 40 of the 55 passengers. The accident destroyed five houses and damaged three others, killing two people on the ground. Survivors credited the heroic actions of the flight attendant who called out to survivors to exit through a hole in the rear of the plane.

== Investigation ==
The National Transportation Safety Board (NTSB) was notified of the accident at 14:40 CST and immediately dispatched an investigation team to the scene. Agents of the Federal Bureau of Investigation (FBI) were on the scene about 45 minutes after the accident, before any investigators from the NTSB. (Note: Extract of letter written by John Reed, chairman of the NTSB to FBI Director William Ruckelshaus (June 5, 1973): Our investigative team assigned to this accident discovered on the day following the accident that several FBI agents had taken a number of non-typical actions relating to this accident within the first few hours following the accident. Included were: for the first time in the memory of our staff, an FBI agent went to the control tower and listened to the tower tapes before our investigators had done so; and for the-first time to our knowledge, in connection with an aircraft accident, an FBI agent interviewed witnesses to the crash, including flight attendants on the aircraft prior to the NTSB interviews. As I am sure you can understand, these actions, particularly with respect to this flight on which Mrs. E. Howard Hunt was killed, have raised innumerable questions in the minds of those with legitimate interests in ascertaining the cause of this accident. Included among those who have asked questions, for example, is the Government Activities Subcommittee of the House Government Operations Committee.) (Note: Extract of reply from William Ruckelshaus to John Reed: FBI has primary investigative jurisdiction in connection with the Destruction of Aircraft or Motor Vehicles (DAMV) Statute, Title 18, Section 32, U.S. Code, which pertains to the willful damaging, destroying or disabling of any civil aircraft in interstate, overseas or foreign air commerce. The fact that Mrs. E. Howard Hunt was aboard the plane was unknown to the FBI at the time our investigation was instituted. It has been longstanding FBI policy to immediately proceed to the scene of an airplane crash for the purpose of developing any information indicating a possible Federal violation within the investigative jurisdiction of the FBI. In all such instances liaison is immediately, established with the National Transportation Safety Board (NTSB) personnel upon their arrival at the scene. Approximately 50 FBI Agents responded to the crash scene, the first ones arriving within 45 minutes of the crash ... The FBI's investigation in this matter was terminated within 20 hours of the accident and on December 11, 1972, Mr. William L. Lamb, NTSB, was furnished with copies of the complete FBI investigation pertaining to this crash after it was determined there was apparently no violation of the DAMV or CAA Statutes.)

The flight data recorder (FDR) on board the aircraft was not functioning at the time of the accident due to a mechanical failure. Fortunately, the ARTS-III (Automated Terminal Radar Services) system at nearby O'Hare International Airport was in operation at the time of the accident, and saved recorded transponder data on magnetic tape. The tapes were analyzed extensively and compared to Boeing flight profile data to develop the course, speed, rate of descent, and altitudes of the plane as it made its approach to Chicago Midway. The system had tracked the plane from a position of 55 miles (89 km) east of its antenna site to close to the accident site.

The cockpit voice recorder (CVR) was working normally and the tape in that "black box" was relatively undamaged, which enabled the NTSB to sequence it in time with the readings of ARTS-III. The NTSB then was able to determine the power output of the engines, at any given point in time, with CVR tape sound analysis. That correlation, CVR with ARTS-III, allowed the NTSB to reconstruct the flight's performance, and to determine that the stick shaker first sounded 6 to 7 seconds after the plane leveled off at 1,000 ft (300 m) MSL (380 ft (120 m) AGL) and continued until ground impact.

The CVR showed cockpit discussion of the FDR fault and it has since been reported as fact that the crew had become distracted by it.

At 14:27, the final-descent checklist was completed and the first officer then called out "thousand feet", apparently in reference to the plane's altitude reaching 1,000 feet (300 m) MSL, a height of only 380 ft (120 m) above the ground at the eventual impact point. According to the airline's procedures, the First Officer should by then have been monitoring instruments, and calling out conformance to the specified descent profile, every 100 ft (30 m). A similar 1000 ft call and instrument check should have been made at a height above ground of 1000 ft (1000 AGL) but had been omitted. Ground impact occurred at 14:28.

The NTSB sought to understand how the rapid descent had been accomplished. From performance studies and simulator tests it was clear that the aircraft was in a high-drag configuration, rather than any of the approach configurations specified by the airline, and the Board concluded that Flight 553 had landing gear down, flaps at 30 degrees and spoilers extended to the flight detent position. The status indicator for the spoilers would then be showing green: the same indication as for spoilers retracted but ready to deploy automatically immediately on landing, potentially misleading the First Officer when executing the final-descent checklist urgently. It was thus likely that when the Captain attempted to level off he failed to immediately retract the spoilers. The aircraft lost speed, and a stall began to develop.

Coincidentally, the Air Traffic Controller decided that the separation between Flight 553 and the slower aircraft ahead of it on the approach to the runway was no longer sufficient and instructed Flight 553 to go around for a missed approach. This instruction was received on 553's radio as the aircraft's stall warning began.

The final mistake was inappropriate retraction of the flaps, from 30 degrees to 15 degrees, while the plane's airspeed was still too low and the spoilers were still extended. Flaps-15 was the correct configuration for the go-around, but not with spoilers deployed; and flap retraction is inappropriate with the stick shaker active because flap retraction increases the minimum speed for flight.

No evidence was found of sabotage or foul play. The NTSB Report stated that because of the "allegations of foul play which have been injected into the publicity surrounding this accident" it was "necessary to present certain aspects of the trauma experienced by nonsurvivors in more detail than would normally be reported". The Board's official finding of the probable cause of the accident was the captain's failure to exercise positive flight management.

The Analysis section of the Report concludes with a paragraph to "emphasize" that the accident sequence resulted from that failure, and "reiterate[d] its often-expressed concern about the apparent lack of crew coordination and cockpit discipline during nonprecision approaches". It went on to make comparison with the recent Eastern Air Lines hard landing at Fort Lauderdale and Southern Airways accident at Huntington Tri-State, and refers the reader to the Report on the Southern Airways accident, which quotes in full an FAA Bulletin raising issues of training and culture.

== Conspiracy theories ==
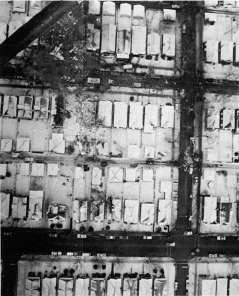
Another view of the accident site

Dorothy Hunt's death led to the accident becoming caught up in rumors and conspiracy theories related to the unfolding Watergate scandal. Hunt was carrying $10,000 in $100 bills when the plane crashed, and some alleged that this money was meant for people connected to Watergate. James McCord alleged that Hunt supplied the Watergate defendants with money for legal expenses. The FBI's appearance at the accident scene was also regarded by some as unusually fast. The autopsies found lethal doses of cyanide in the blood stream of the pilot and a few of the passengers. Some theorists speculate that this was caused by foul play; however, some of the materials on the plane such as wool and plastics release cyanide as they burn, which could account for the amount found. Skeptics of the official narrative speculated that the plane was targeted due to Hunt's presence on board, and that sabotage of the flight was covered up by government agencies. As a result, the accident became known as "the Watergate crash".

One proponent of Watergate-related theories was Sherman Skolnick, a Chicago-based private investigator, who alleged that the aircraft had been sabotaged by the CIA. (Note: "Skolnick was instantaneous in charging that the crash of United flight 533 was the result of sabotage and that there was a big Watergate connection.") On June 13, 1973, Skolnick testified at an NTSB hearing in Rosemont, Illinois, and claimed the Federal Bureau of Investigation, Columbia Broadcasting System, United Air Lines, traffic controllers at Midway, and the NTSB itself conspired in a plot to sabotage the flight because 12 of its passengers had links to Watergate. (Note: According to the Chicago Tribune, Skolnick also linked the crash to "a pipeline lobby, investment scandals in Switzerland, legislative acts in Costa Rica, and underworld dealings in stolen currency.") United Air Lines officials had asked the NTSB to hear Skolnick's version because he had frequently charged that UAL was among those attempting to suppress his explanation of events. He said that Hunt carried $2 million in traveler's checks and money orders stolen from the Committee for the Re-Election of the President, $50,000 in currency, and documents that may have led to the impeachment of President Richard Nixon. He stated a hitman — whom Nixon had placed aboard the aircraft to make sure that Hunt was killed — also died in the accident. The Chicago Tribune said that Skolnick "[knitted] scores of facts and assumptions together loosely" and "[no] documentation was produced to substantiate the charges".

The claim of CIA responsibility was echoed by Nixon's special counsel Chuck Colson in an interview with Time magazine in 1974. Nonetheless, the same article speculated that Colson was accusing the CIA of the broad Watergate conspiracy in a desperate attempt to stave off Nixon's impeachment in the scandal, and that Colson may have "lost touch with reality" as he faced a prison sentence.

== In popular culture ==
The accident, the deaths of Clark and Hunt, and elements of the conspiracy theories were featured in the 2023 HBO miniseries White House Plumbers.

== See also ==
- List of unrecovered and unusable flight recorders
