= Arctic Glacier =

American manufacturer of packaged ice

Arctic Glacier Premium Ice, LLC.
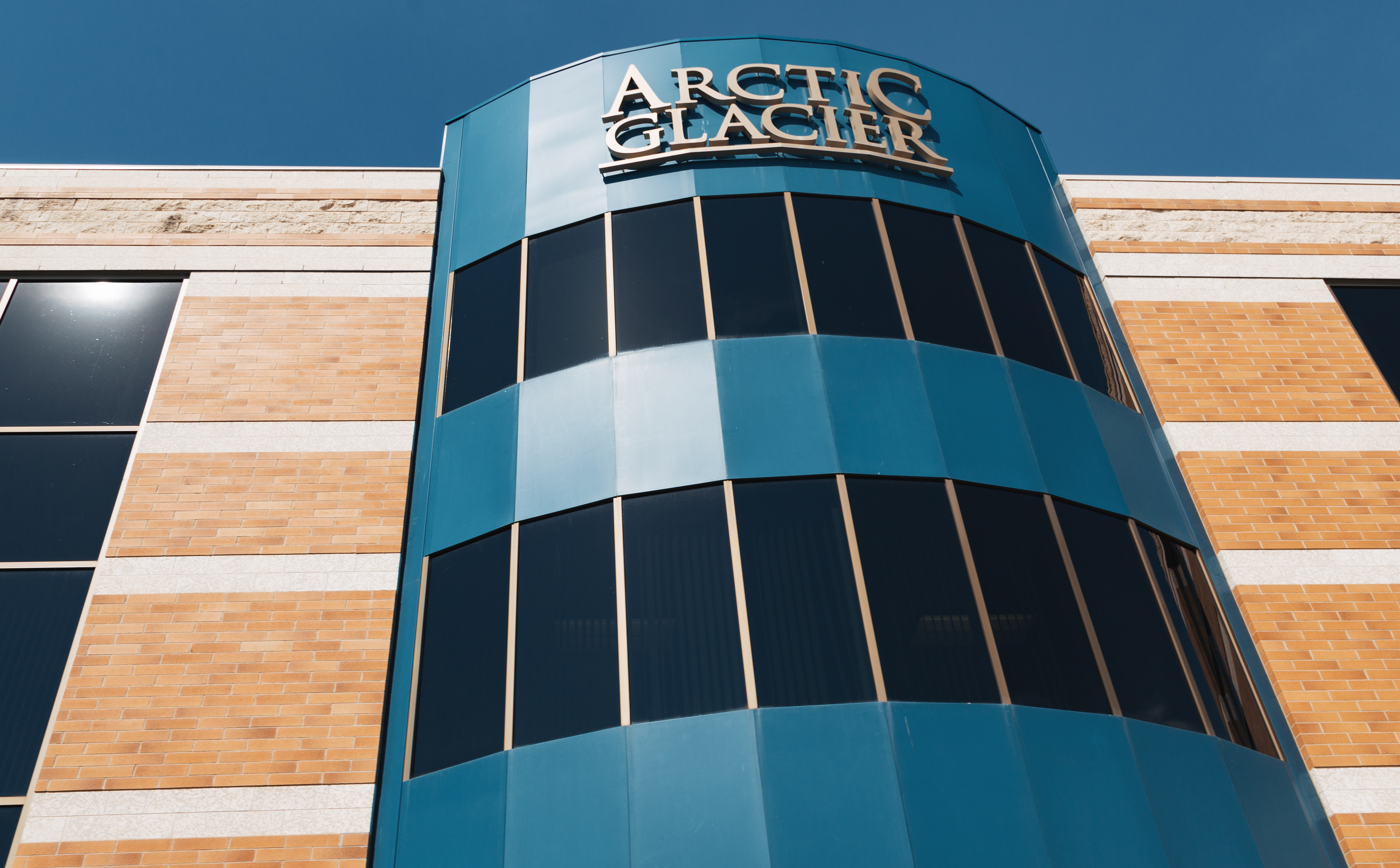
- Winnipeg corporate headquarters
- Type: Private
- Industry: Beverages – soft drinks
- Founded: 1996
- Headquarters: Bala Cynwyd, Pennsylvania (US); Winnipeg, Manitoba (Canada)
- Number of locations: 109
- Area served: North America
- Products: premium packaged ice products
- Services: Direct-to-store or -business delivery and other ice services such as snow scenes and ice sculptures
- Number of employees: 650
- Website: www.arcticglacier.com

Arctic Glacier Inc. is a manufacturer of packaged ice products and ice services in North America.

== History ==
The company was founded in 1996 and has rapidly grown to become the largest producer of ice for the Canadian market and one of the largest for the American market. The company operates over 100 production and distribution facilities, and employs more than 1,200 people year-round. Employment increases to over 2,400 employees during the summer to meet the increased seasonal demand.

In 2021, Arctic Glacier bought out Getchell Brothers, Inc. a 133-year-old Maine-based company.

The United States corporate headquarters are located in Bala Cynwyd, Pennsylvania, with its Canadian headquarters located in Winnipeg, Manitoba.
