= George Fisher =

George Fisher may refer to:

== Arts and entertainment ==
- George Fisher (actor) (1891–1960), American actor
- George Fisher (dramatist) (1909–1970), Welsh language author
- George Fisher (journalist) (1909–1987), Hollywood gossip columnist and radio personality
- George Fisher (cartoonist) (1923–2003), American political cartoonist
- George Fisher (1927–2005), American actor a.k.a. Brock Peters
- George Fisher (musician) (born 1970), American singer

== Politics ==
- George Fisher (Illinois pioneer) (died 1820), American pioneer, physician, and legislator
- George Fisher (New York politician) (1788–1861), American politician
- George P. Fisher (1817–1899), American politician in Delaware
- George Fisher (New Zealand politician) (1843–1905), New Zealand politician

== Science and academics ==
- George Fisher (scientist) (1794–1873), British Arctic scientist
- George Jackson Fisher (1825–1893), American physician, bibliophile, collector and author
- George Park Fisher (1827–1909), American theologian and historian
- George Clyde Fisher (1878–1949), curator at the American Museum of Natural History
- Gotthelf Fischer von Waldheim (1771–1853), German anatomist, entomologist and paleontologist

== Sports ==
- George Fisher (baseball) (1855–1937), American baseball player
- George E. Fisher (1869–1958), American football coach and college professor
- George J. Fisher (1871–1960), American physician and sport administrator
- Showboat Fisher (George Fisher, 1899–1994), American baseball player
- George Fisher (basketball coach) (1924–2014), American college basketball coach and administrator
- George Fisher (basketball player), American basketball coach and player
- George Fisher (footballer) (1925–2015), English footballer
- George Fisher (netball) (born 1998), English netball player

== Other people ==
- George Fisher (settler) (1795–1873), Serbian-born Mexican and American citizen
- George Fisher (bishop) (1844–1921), bishop of Southampton in the Church of England
- George M. C. Fisher (born 1940), American business manager
- George A. Fisher Jr. (born 1942), retired United States Army officer
- George Fisher (mining engineer) (1903–2007), chairman of Mount Isa Mines, Australia

== See also ==
- George Drennen Fischer (1925–2021), American activist and spokesman for the National Education Association
- George R. Fischer (1937–2016), American underwater archaeologist
- Georg Fischer (disambiguation)
