= Master list of Nixon's political opponents =

Supplemental expansion of Nixon's Enemies List

The master list of Nixon's political opponents was a secret list compiled by US president Richard Nixon's Presidential Counselor Charles Colson. It was an expansion of the original Nixon's Enemies List of 20 key people considered opponents of Nixon. In total, the expanded list contained 220 people or organizations.

The master list was compiled in mid-1971 in Charles Colson's office and sent in memorandum form to John Dean. On June 27, 1973, Dean provided to the Senate Watergate Committee this updated "master list" of political opponents. The original list had multiple sections, including a section for "Black Congressmen".

The purpose of the list was to "use the available Federal machinery to screw [their] political enemies." One such scheme involved using the Internal Revenue Service to harass people on the list.

== Response ==
Carol Channing stated that inclusion on the list was her greatest accomplishment. Talk show host and journalist Lou Gordon, who was also on the list, considered his inclusion to be a "badge of honor". Tony Randall was similarly proud, according to Jack Klugman in his memoir on Randall.

In The Great Shark Hunt (1979), Hunter S. Thompson expressed disappointment in not having been included on the list, writing "I would almost have preferred a vindictive tax audit to that kind of crippling exclusion."

Carl Djerassi's 1992 autobiography The Pill, Pigmy Chimps, and Degas' Horse stated that President Nixon awarded him the National Medal of Science when he was on the Enemies List. Djerassi attributed his inclusion to his opposition to the Vietnam War.

== Entries ==
=== Senators ===
- Howard Baker (R-TN)
- Birch Bayh (D-IN)
- Sam Ervin (D-NC)
- William Fulbright (D-AR)
- Fred R. Harris (D-OK)
- Harold Hughes (D-IA)
- Ted Kennedy (D-MA)
- George McGovern (D-SD)
- Walter Mondale (D-MN)
- Edmund Muskie (D-ME)
- Gaylord Nelson (D-WI)
- William Proxmire (D-WI)

=== Members of the House of Representatives ===
- Bella Abzug (D-NY)
- William Anderson (D-TN)
- John Brademas (D-IN)
- Robert Drinan (D-MA)
- Robert Kastenmeier (D-WI)
- Pete McCloskey (R-CA)
- Wright Patman (D-TX)

Black congressmen and congresswomen

- Shirley Chisholm (D-NY)
- Bill Clay (D-MO)
- George Collins (D-IL)
- John Conyers (D-MI)
- Ronald Dellums (D-CA)
- Charles Diggs (D-MI)
- Augustus Hawkins (D-CA)
- Ralph Metcalfe (D-IL)
- Parren Mitchell (D-MD)
- Robert Nix (D-PA)
- Charles Rangel (D-NY)
- Louis Stokes (D-OH)

=== Other politicians ===
- John Lindsay, mayor of New York City (D-NY)
- Eugene McCarthy, former U.S. senator (D-MN)
- George Wallace, governor of Alabama (D-AL)

=== Organizations ===
- Black Panthers, Huey Newton [sic]
- Brookings Institution, Lesley Gelb [sic] and others
- Business Executives Move for VN Peace. Henry E. Niles, national chairman. Vincent McGee, executive director
- Committee for an Effective Congress. Russell Hemenway
- Common Cause, John Gardner, Morton Halperin, Charles Goodell, Walter Hickel
- Congressional Black Caucus
- COPE (AFL–CIO Committee on Political Education), Alexander E Barkan
- Council for a Livable World, Bernard T. Feld, pr idem: professor of physics. MIT
- Farmers Union, NFO
- Institute for Policy Studies, Richard Barnet, Marcus Raskin
- National Economic Council, Inc.
- National Education Association, Sam M. Lambert president
- National Student Association, Charles Palmer president
- National Welfare Rights Organization, George Wiley
- Potomac Associates, William Watts
- SANE, Sanford Gottlieb
- Southern Christian Leadership, Ralph Abernathy;
- Third National Convocation on the Challenge of Building Peace, Robert V Roosa, chairman
- Businessmen's Educational Fund

=== Labor ===
- I. W. Abel, Steelworkers
- Karl Feller, president, International Union United Brewery. Flour, Cereal, Soft Drink and Distillery Workers, Cincinnati
- Harold J. Gibbons, international vice president, Teamsters
- Nathaniel Goldfinger, AFL–CIO
- A. F. Grospiron, president, Oil, Chemical Atomic Workers International Union, Denver
- Matthew Guinan, president, Transport Work. Union of America, New York City
- Paul Jennings, president, International Union Electrical, Radio & Machine Workers, Washington, D.C.
- Herman D. Kenin, vice president, AFL–CIO. D
- Lane Kirkland, secretary-treasurer. AFL–CIO
- Frederick O'Neal. president. Actors and Artists America, New York City
- William Pollock, president, Textile Workers Union of America, New York City
- Jacob Potofsky, general president, Amalgam. Clothing Workers of America, New York City
- Leonard Woodcock, president, United Auto Workers, Detroit
- Jerry Wurf, international president, American Federal, State, County and Municipal Employ Washington, D.C.

=== Media ===
- Jack Anderson, columnist, "Washington Merry-Go-Round"
- Jim Bishop, author, columnist, King Features Syndicate
- Thomas Braden, columnist, Los Angeles Times Syndicate
- D.J.R. Bruckner, Los Angeles Times Syndicate
- Marquis Childs, chief Washington correspondent, St. Louis Post-Dispatch
- James Deakin, White House correspondent, St. Louis Post-Dispatch
- James Doyle, Washington Star
- Richard Dudman, St. Louis Post-Dispatch
- Jules Duscha [sic], Washingtonian
- William Eaton, Chicago Daily News
- Rowland Evans Jr., syndicated columnist, Publishers-Hall Syndicate
- Saul Friedmann, Knight Newspapers, syndicated columnist
- Clayton Fritchey, syndicated columnist Washington correspondent. Harper's Magazine
- George Frazier, The Boston Globe
- Lou Gordon, The Detroit News columnist and television talk show host
- Katharine Graham, editor and publisher, The Washington Post
- Pete Hamill, New York Post
- Michael Harrington, author and journal member, executive committee of the Socialist Party of America
- Sydney J. Harris, columnist, drama critic and writer of "Strictly Personal", Publishers-Hall Syndicate
- Robert Healy, The Boston Globe
- William Hines Jr., journalist. science education, Chicago Sun-Times
- Stanley Karnow, foreign correspondent, The Washington Post
- Ted Knap, syndicated columnist, New York Daily News
- Erwin Knoll, The Progressive
- Morton Kondracke, Chicago Sun-Times
- Joseph Kraft, columnist, Publishers-Hall Syndicate
- James Laird, The Philadelphia Inquirer
- Max Lerner, syndicated columnist, New York Post: author, lecturer, professor (Brandeis University)
- Stanley Levey, E.W. Scripps Company
- Flora Lewis syndicated columnist on economics
- Stuart Loory, Los Angeles Times
- Mary McGrory, syndicated columnist
- Frank Mankiewicz, syndicated columnist, Los Angeles Times
- James Millstone, St. Louis Post-Dispatch
- Martin Nolan, The Boston Globe
- Ed Guthman, Los Angeles Times
- Thomas O'Neill, The Baltimore Sun
- John Pierson, The Wall Street Journal
- William Prochnau, The Seattle Times
- James Reston, The New York Times
- Carl Rowan, columnist, Publishers-Hall Syndicate
- Warren Unna, The Washington Post, National Educational Television
- Harriet Van Horne, columnist, New York Post
- Milton Viorst, reporter, author, writer
- James Wechsler, New York Post
- Tom Wicker, The New York Times
- Garry Wills, syndicated columnist, author of Nixon Agonistes
- The New York Times
- The Washington Post
- St. Louis Post-Dispatch
- Robert Manning, editor, The Atlantic Monthly
- John Osborne, The New Republic
- Richard Rovere, The New Yorker
- Robert Sherrill, The Nation
- Paul Samuelson, Newsweek
- Julian Goodman, chief executive officer, NBC
- John Macy, Jr, president, Corporation for Public Broadcasting, former Civil Service Commission
- Marvin Kalb, CBS
- Daniel Schorr, CBS
- Lem Tucker, NBC
- Sander Vanocur, NBC

=== Celebrities ===
- Carol Channing, actress
- Bill Cosby, comedian
- Jane Fonda, actress and political activist
- June Foray, voice actress
- Dick Gregory, comedian and civil rights and peace activist.
- Gene Hackman, actor
- Burt Lancaster, actor
- Steve McQueen, actor
- Joe Namath, former New York Jets Quarterback, erroneously listed as the New York Giants QB
- Paul Newman, actor
- Gregory Peck, actor
- Tony Randall, actor
- Barbra Streisand, actress and singer

=== Business people ===
- Charles B. Beneson, president, Beneson Realty Co.
- Nelson Bengston, president, Bengston & Co.
- Holmes Brown, vice president, public relations, Continental Can Co.
- Benjamin Buttenweiser, limited partner, Kuhn, Loeb & Co.
- Lawrence G. Chait, chairman Lawrence G. Chait & Co., Inc.
- Ernest R. Chanes, president, Consolidated Water Conditioning Co.
- Maxwell Dane, chairman, executive committee, Doyle, Dane & Bernbach, Inc.
- Charles H. Dyson, chairman, the Dyson-Kissner Corp.
- Norman Eisner, president, Lincoln Graphic Arts.
- Charles B. Finch, vice president, Alleghany Power System, Inc.
- Frank Heineman, president, Men's Wear International.
- George Hillman, president, Ellery Products Manufacturing Co.
- Bertram Lichtenstein, president, Delton Ltd.
- William Manealoff, president, Concord Steel Corp.
- Gerald McKee, president, McKee, Berger, Mansueto.
- Paul Milstein, president, Circle Industries Corp.
- Stewart R. Mott, Stewart R. Mott, Associates.
- Lawrence S. Phillips, president, Phillips-Van Heusen Corp.
- David Rose, chairman, Rose Associates.
- Julian Roth senior partner, Emery Roth & Sons.
- William Ruder, president, Ruder & Finn, Inc.
- Si Scharer, president, Scharer Associates, Inc.
- Alfred P. Slaner, president, Kayser-Roth Corp.
- Roger Sonnabend, chairman, Sonesta International Hotels.

=== Business additions ===
- Business Executives Move for Vietnam Peace and New National Priorities
- Morton Sweig, president, National Cleaning Contractors
- Alan V. Tishman, executive vice president, Tishman Realty & Construction Co., Inc.
- Ira D. Wallach, president, Gottesman & Co., Inc.
- George Weissman, president, Philip Morris Corp.
- Ralph Weller, president, Otis Elevator Company

=== Business ===
- Clifford Alexander Jr., member, Equal Opportunity Commission; LBJ's special assistant
- Hugh Calkins, Cleveland lawyer, member, Harvard Corp
- Ramsey Clark, partner, Weiss, Goldberg, Rifkind, Wharton & Garrison; former attorney general
- Lloyd Cutler, lawyer, Wilmer, Cutler & Pickering, Washington, D.C.
- Henry L. Kimelman, chief fund raiser for McGovern. president, Overview Group
- Raymond Lapin, former president, FNMA; corporation executive
- Hans F. Loeser, chairman, Boston Lawyers' Vietnam Committee
- Robert McNamara, president of the World Bank; former Secretary of Defense
- Hans Morgenthau, a pioneer in the field of international relations theory
- Victor Palmieri, lawyer, business consultant, real estate executive, Los Angeles
- Arnold Picker, Muskie's chief fund raiser; mayor of Golden Beach, Florida; executive vice president of United Artists; enemy number one on Nixon's Enemies List
- Robert S. Pirie, Harold Hughes' chief fund raiser: Boston lawyer
- Joseph Rosenfield, Harold Hughes' money man; retired Des Moines lawyer
- Henry Rowen, president, Rand Corp., former assistant director of budget (LBJ)
- Sargent Shriver, former US. ambassador to France; lawyer, Strasser, Spiefelberg, Fried, Frank & Kempelman, Washington, D.C.; 1972 Democratic Party Vice Presidential candidate; former director of the Peace Corps
- Theodore Sorensen, lawyer, Weiss, Goldberg, Rifkind, Wharton & Garrison, New York
- Ray Stark, Broadway producer
- Howard Stein, president and director, Dreyfus Corporation
- Milton Semer, chairman, Muskie Election Committee; lawyer, Semer and Jacobsen
- George H. Talbot, president, Charlotte Liberty Mutual Insurance Co.; headed anti-Vietnam ad
- Arthur Taylor, vice president, International Paper Company
- Jack Valenti, president, Motion Picture Association
- Paul Warnke, Muskie financial supporter, former assistant secretary of defense
- Thomas J. Watson Jr., Muskie financial supporter; chairman, IBM

=== Academics ===
- Michael Ellis DeBakey, chairman, department of surgery, Baylor College of Medicine; surgeon-in-chief, Ben Taub General Hospital, Texas
- Derek Curtis Bok, dean, Harvard Law School
- Kingman Brewster Jr., president, Yale University
- McGeorge Bundy, president, Ford Foundation
- Noam Chomsky, professor of linguistics, Massachusetts Institute of Technology
- Carl Djerassi, professor of chemistry, and co-inventor of the first oral contraceptive pill, Stanford University
- Daniel Ellsberg, professor, Massachusetts Institute of Technology.
- George Drennen Fischer, member, executive committee, National Education Association
- John Kenneth Galbraith, professor of economics, Harvard University
- Patricia Harris, educator, lawyer, former U.S. ambassador; chairman welfare committee, Urban League
- Walter Heller, regents professor of economics, University of Minnesota
- Edwin Land, inventor of instant photography
- Herbert Ley Jr., former FDA commissioner; professor of epidemiology, Harvard University
- Matthew Stanley Meselson, professor of biology, Harvard University
- Lloyd N. Morrisett, (Note: There is some amibiguity over whether "Lloyd N. Morrisett" refers to Lloyd N. Morrisett Sr. or Lloyd N. Morrisett Jr., though Morrisett Jr. has stated that he believed it to be referring to himself.) professor and associate director, education program, University of California
- Joseph Rhodes Jr., fellow, Harvard University; member, Scranton commission on Campus Unrest
- Bayard Rustin, civil rights activist; director, A. Philip Randolph Institute, New York
- David Selden, president, American Federation of Teachers
- Arthur Schlesinger Jr., professor of humanities, City University of New York
- Jeremy Stone, director, Federation of American Scientists
- Jerome Wiesner, president, Massachusetts Institute of Technology
- Samuel M. Lambert, president, National Education Association
