= George Fischer =

George Fischer may refer to:

- George Drennen Fischer (1925–2021), American activist and spokesman for the National Education Association
- George R. Fischer (1937–2016), American underwater archaeologist
- George Fischer Middle School

== See also ==
- George Fisher (disambiguation)
