= David M. Shoup =

U.S. Marine Corps General (1904–1983)

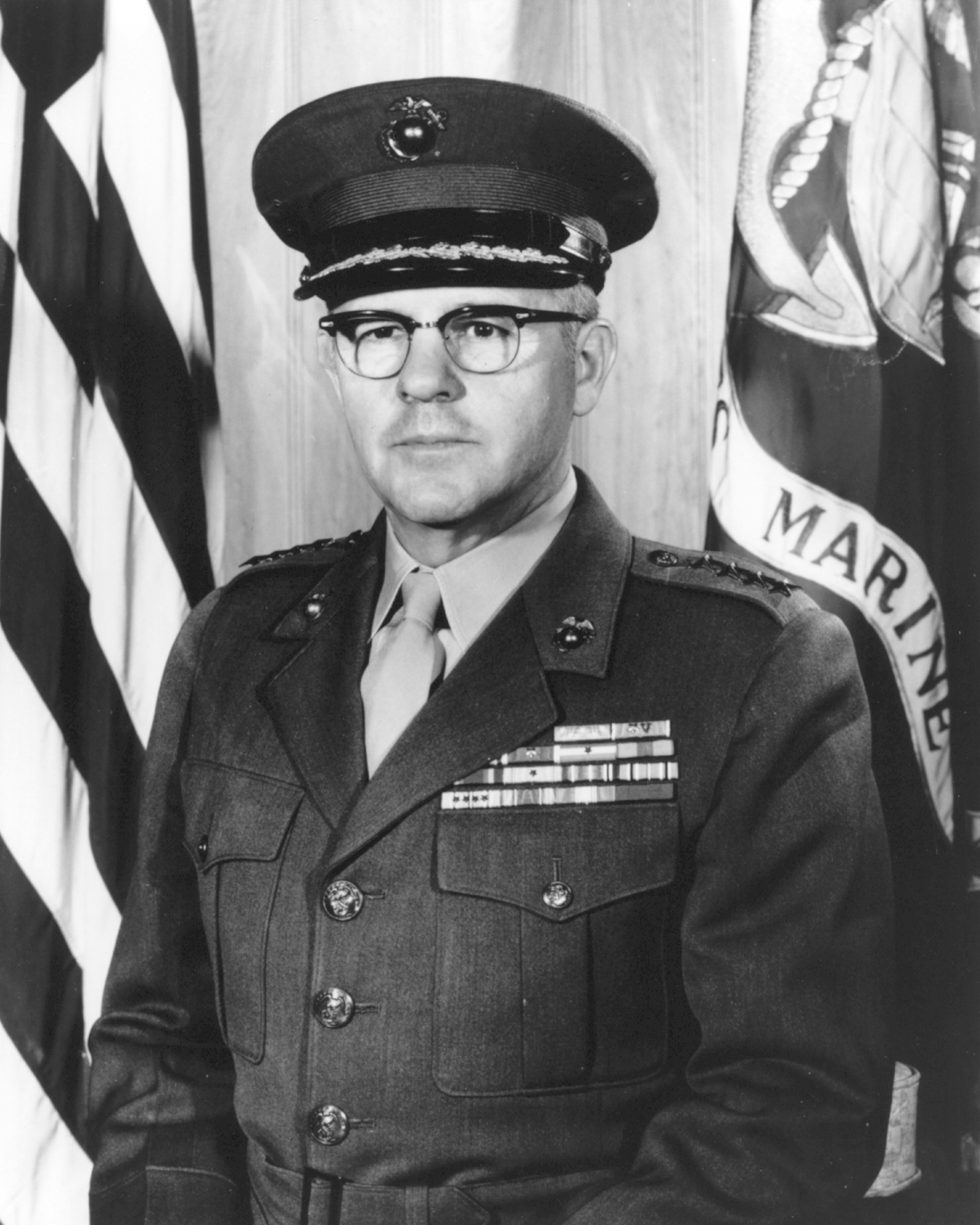
- David Monroe Shoup
- Born: December 30, 1904; Battle Ground, Indiana, U.S.
- Died: January 13, 1983 (aged 78); Arlington, Virginia, U.S.
- Burial place: Arlington National Cemetery
- Military career
- Allegiance: United States
- Branch: United States Marine Corps
- Service years: 1926–1963
- Rank: General
- Commands: Commandant of the Marine Corps; Marine Corps Recruit Depot Parris Island; 3rd Marine Division; 1st Marine Division; USMC Inspector General; The Basic School; Service Command, FMF, Pacific; 2nd Marines
- Conflicts: Chinese Civil War; World War II; Battle of Tarawa; Battle of Saipan; Battle of Tinian; Korean War; Vietnam War
- Awards: Medal of Honor; Navy Distinguished Service Medal; Legion of Merit (2); Navy and Marine Corps Commendation Medal; Purple Heart (2); Distinguished Service Order (United Kingdom)
- Other work: Anti Vietnam War activist

David Monroe Shoup (December 30, 1904, Indiana – January 13, 1983, Virginia) was a general of the United States Marine Corps who was awarded the Medal of Honor in World War II, served as the 22nd Commandant of the Marine Corps, and, after retiring, became one of the most prominent critics of the Vietnam War.

Born in Indiana to an impoverished family, Shoup joined the military for financial reasons. Rising through the ranks in the interwar era, he was twice deployed to China during the Chinese Civil War. He served in Iceland at the beginning of U.S. involvement in World War II and as a staff officer during the Pacific War. He was unexpectedly given command of the 2nd Marines and led the initial invasion of Tarawa, for which he was awarded the Medal of Honor and the British Distinguished Service Order. He served in the Marianas campaign and later became a high-level military logistics officer.

Solidifying his reputation as a hard-driving and assertive leader, Shoup rose through the senior leadership of the Marine Corps, overhauling fiscal affairs, logistics, and recruit training. He was selected as commandant by President Dwight D. Eisenhower and later served in the administration of John F. Kennedy. He reformed the Corps, emphasizing combat readiness and fiscal efficiency, against what was perceived as politicking among its officers.

Shoup opposed the military escalation in response to events such as the Cuban Missile Crisis and the Bay of Pigs invasion, but his strongest opposition was to U.S. involvement in South Vietnam. His opposition grew in strength after he retired from the military in 1963; he was strongly opposed to both the strategy of the conflict and the excessive influence of corporations and military officials upon foreign policy. His high-profile criticism later spread to include the military industrial complex and what he saw as a pervasive militarism in American culture. Historians consider Shoup's statements opposing the war to be among the most pointed and high-profile leveled by a veteran against the Vietnam War.

== Early years ==
David Monroe Shoup was born on December 30, 1904, in Battle Ground, Indiana. His family lived on a farm in Ash Grove, but moved to Covington, Indiana to live on a new farm in 1916. At age 12 he was enrolled in Covington High School, a competitive high school with an advanced curriculum. Shoup was an excellent student, maintaining high marks in French, English, physics, and history. Additionally, he was involved in several extracurricular activities, including basketball, and was class president in his senior year. He graduated in 1921. He later affectionately referred to his impoverished upbringing as that of an "Indiana plowboy." Regarded by friends as very sociable, he met Zola De Haven in his first year and later said he had been instantly attracted to her. They were both very competitive in academics and athletics, and the two dated throughout high school; they were married in 1931.

After high school, Shoup attended DePauw University, where he was one of 100 awarded the Edward Rector Scholarship, giving him full tuition. Majoring in mathematics, he joined the Delta Upsilon fraternity and maintained high marks, narrowly failing the selection criteria for Phi Beta Kappa Society. He was on the track and field and rifle teams, and also competed in the wrestling and football teams. He won the Indiana and Kentucky Amateur Athletic Union marathon in 1925. He waited tables, washed dishes and worked in a cement factory to help pay his expenses. Lack of funds compelled him to take a year off after his junior year to teach school, and his expenses were further strained when he contracted a severe case of pneumonia and incurred hospital bills. He opted to enroll in the Reserve Officers Training Corps (ROTC) to offset his living expenses, and later recalled that this was the only reason he joined the military. He graduated from DePauw in 1926.

From an early age, Shoup was molded by the progressive ideas of Indiana politicians, sympathizing with rural progressives fighting against the interests of big businesses. He developed an anti-imperialist attitude, and his skepticism about American foreign policy, influenced by his small-town background, made him an outspoken opponent of the unnecessary use of military force. He felt the use of troops for economic or imperialist consideration was wrong, a viewpoint he would carry for his entire career.

== Junior officer ==
While at a Scabbard and Blade honors society conference in New Orleans, Louisiana, Shoup heard a speech by Major General John A. Lejeune, the Commandant of the Marine Corps, offering commissions in the U.S. Marine Corps to interested officer candidates. Shortly after being commissioned as a second lieutenant in the U.S. Army Reserve in May 1926, Shoup applied, and was offered a commission in the Marine Corps. In August 1926, he resigned his commission in the army and traveled from Camp Knox, Kentucky, to Chicago, Illinois, for physical exams. On August 25, 1926, he arrived at the Marine Corps barracks at the Philadelphia Navy Yard, where he was commissioned as a second lieutenant, and commenced Marine Officers Basic School. Shoup maintained that he had never previously considered a military career and had only chosen to become a military officer for the pay. Throughout his service, he excelled in athletics and marksmanship, and during his early career he would coach recreational athletic teams in addition to his regular assignments. He quickly established himself as an assertive and demanding leader, impressing both his commanders and his subordinates. Despite his no-nonsense demeanor, those he commanded later recalled his ability to keep morale with his sense of humor. He often sported a clenched cigar, which became something of a trademark during his front-line service.

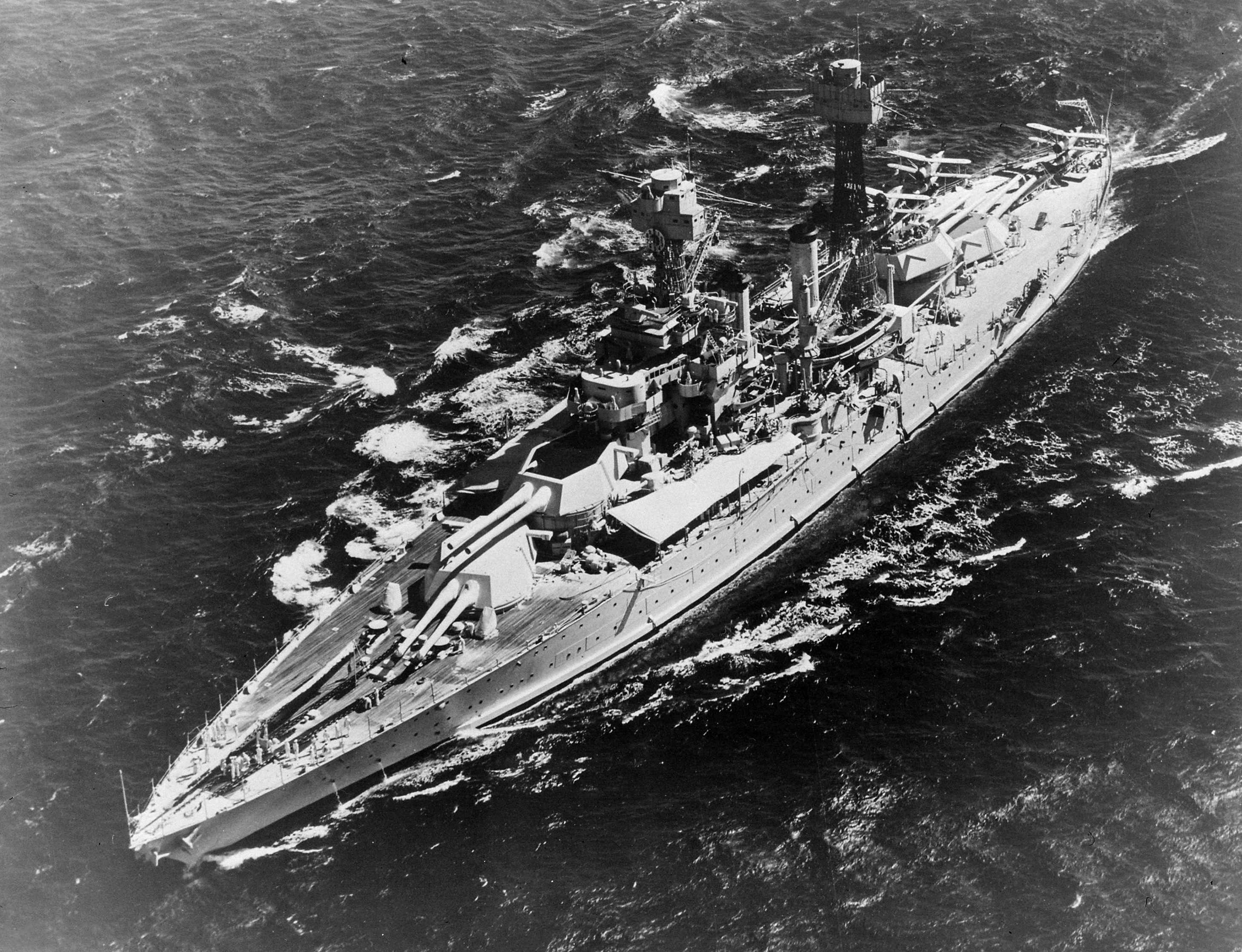
USS Maryland, on which Shoup served from 1929 to 1931

On April 1, 1927, Shoup and nine other officers were pulled from training to accompany a detachment of Marines sent to China to protect American interests during the instability of the Chinese Civil War. Embarking from San Diego with the 2nd Battalion, 10th Marines, Shoup's contingent was to play a primarily defensive role, and not engage in military action. Still, he was personally opposed to the mission, feeling that Americans in China were exploiting its people. The contingent landed in Shanghai on 10 June aboard USS Chaumont. Initially, they conducted shore patrol around American sections of the city. On July, 5 the battalion was moved to Tianjin to protect American interests there should Chinese Nationalist troops threaten them. Shoup became seriously ill there, and remained hospitalized until it was announced U.S. troops would leave. He briefly returned to Shanghai to oversee foreign troop departures with the 4th Marines, before he departed from China on December 7, 1928.

Following this assignment, Shoup returned to the United States and completed his training. He then spent short stints at Marine bases in Quantico, Virginia, Pensacola, Florida, and San Francisco, California. From June 1929 to September 1931 he served with the Marine Detachment aboard USS Maryland, where he coached the boxing and wrestling squads. Following this duty he was assigned to Marine Corps Recruit Depot San Diego. In May 1932 he was ordered to Puget Sound Navy Yard in Bremerton, Washington, where he was promoted to first lieutenant one month later. He served on temporary duty with the Civilian Conservation Corps in Idaho and New Jersey from June 1933 to May 1934, after which he returned to Bremerton.

Shoup went back to China in November 1934, again serving briefly with the 4th Marines in Shanghai. He was soon reassigned as a legation guard in Beiping, where he taught the post's pistol and rifle teams to shoot competitively. They won at least one major competition. He also had time to observe the troops of the Empire of Japan, gaining great respect for their discipline. In 1936, he came down with a serious case of pneumonia and had to be evacuated from China. His next duty was at Puget Sound Navy Yard. In October 1936, he was promoted to captain. In July 1937 he entered Junior Course, Marine Corps Schools in Quantico, which he completed in May 1938. He then served as an instructor and Plans & Training officer with Reserve Officers Class at Quantico for two years. In June 1940 he joined the 6th Marines in San Diego, and was promoted to major in April 1941.

== World War II ==
=== Staff officer ===
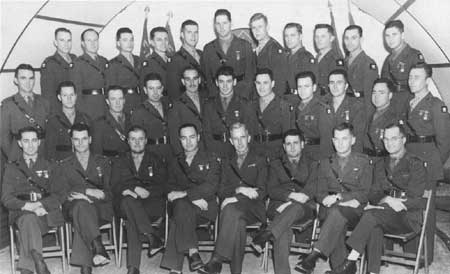
Officers of the 1st Provisional Marine Brigade pose for a photograph in Iceland in 1941.

Shoup was assigned to the 1st Provisional Marine Brigade, which was moved to Iceland in May 1941, supporting an occupation there to prevent Nazi forces from threatening it. Replacing the outgoing British 49th (West Riding) Infantry Division, the brigade continued to garrison the country for several months, and he was there with the Headquarters Company at the time of the Japanese attack on Pearl Harbor in December 1941. For his service in Iceland, he was awarded the Letter of Commendation with Commendation Ribbon. In February 1942 he was given command of the 2nd Battalion, 6th Marines. With the United States at war, 1st Provisional Marine Brigade moved to New York City, New York, in March, and was disbanded. Shoup moved with his battalion to Camp Elliott in San Diego.

In July 1942, Shoup was named as operations and training officer (then known as D-3) of the 2nd Marine Division, and he was promoted to lieutenant colonel in August 1942. The following month he accompanied the division to Wellington, New Zealand, aboard SS Matsonia and oversaw much of its training there. He was also briefly attached to the 1st Marine Division in October 1942 as an observer during the Guadalcanal campaign, then to the 43rd Infantry Division on Rendova Island during the New Georgia Campaign in June 1943. During the latter assignment, Shoup was wounded in action and evacuated. Still, from these experiences he observed amphibious warfare techniques which would be useful later in the war.

=== Tarawa ===
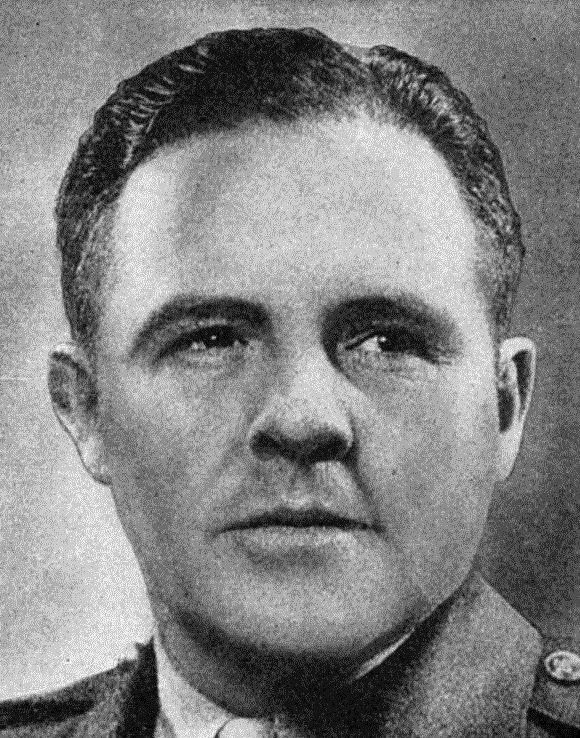
Shoup as a colonel

In mid-1943, Shoup was transferred to the staff of Major General Julian C. Smith, commander of the 2nd Marine Division, and tasked to help plan the invasion of Betio on Tarawa Atoll. Shoup's aggressive leadership style would complement the offensive strategy his superiors were seeking in taking the atoll. He was tasked with drawing up initial plans, designating the landing beaches on Betio for the 2nd Marine Division, and overseeing some rehearsals at Efate. However, after Colonel William W. Marshall, commander of the 2nd Marines, suffered a nervous breakdown before the invasion, Smith promoted Shoup to colonel and gave him command of the regiment in spite of Shoup's lack of combat experience.

The invasion commenced on November 20, 1943, when Shoup disembarked from the transport USS Zeilin. His force met heavy resistance on the beaches. His LVT was disabled by shore fire, and he had to proceed without transportation. As he was wading ashore at around 11:00, he was struck by shrapnel in the legs and received a grazing wound from a bullet in the neck. In spite of these wounds, he rallied Marines around him and led them ashore to join the initial assault waves, who had been in action for over two hours by then. He was able to coordinate the troops on the beaches and organize them as they began to push inland against an anticipated Japanese counterattack. He continuously organized aggressive attacks on the defenders, and was noted for his bravery and vigour during the conflict. On the second day of the attack, he ordered an advance inland by the remnants of the 1st and 2nd Battalions of the 2nd Marines. By the afternoon, Shoup was confident the Marines were winning the battle, and reinforcements began to arrive in force. At 16:00 on November, 21, he composed a lengthy situation report to division headquarters on USS Maryland culminating in the phrase, "Combat efficiency: We are winning." That night, Shoup was relieved by Colonel Merritt A. Edson, the division's chief of staff, who commanded the landed troops of the 2nd Marine Division pending the arrival ashore of Julian Smith on November 22. Six years later, Shoup made a cameo appearance in the movie Sands of Iwo Jima reprising his actions that first night on Tarawa, although he had originally been brought onto the movie as a technical advisor.

For his leadership during the assault and the push inland Shoup was awarded the Medal of Honor and the British Distinguished Service Order. For his role in planning the invasion he was awarded the Legion of Merit with "V" device. He also was awarded the Purple Heart for the combat wounds he suffered during the course of the campaign. Ten years after the assault, Shoup remarked of the operation, "there was never a doubt in the minds of those ashore what the final outcome of the battle for Tarawa would be. There was for some seventy-six hours, however, considerable haggling with the enemy over the exact price we would have to pay." In 1968, he returned to Tarawa to dedicate a memorial to the battle and to the American and Japanese troops who had died there.

=== Subsequent wartime service ===
In December 1943, Shoup became chief of staff of the 2nd Marine Division, which was then refitting and training in Hawaii for the upcoming invasion of the Marianas in June. Shoup performed well as a staff officer, assisting in the planning for the battles for Saipan and Tinian. Though a divisional staff officer, he still managed to find occasion to be forward in the fighting. In one instance on Saipan he became trapped in a forward observer post with fellow officer Wallace M. Greene. Greene later recalled in the midst of the Japanese attack Shoup remained impressively calm. Shoup was awarded a second Legion of Merit with "V" device for his work in this campaign. At the end of operations on the Mariana Islands, Shoup returned to the United States in October 1944. He served as a logistics officer in the Division of Plans and Policies at Marine Headquarters in Washington, D.C. He remained at this post for the rest of the war.

== Cold War era ==
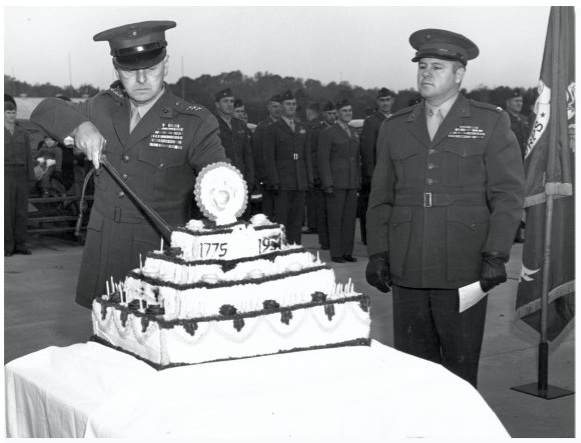
Shoup (right), then commander of The Basic School, looks on as Lieutenant General Franklin A. Hart cuts the Marine Corps birthday cake in 1951.

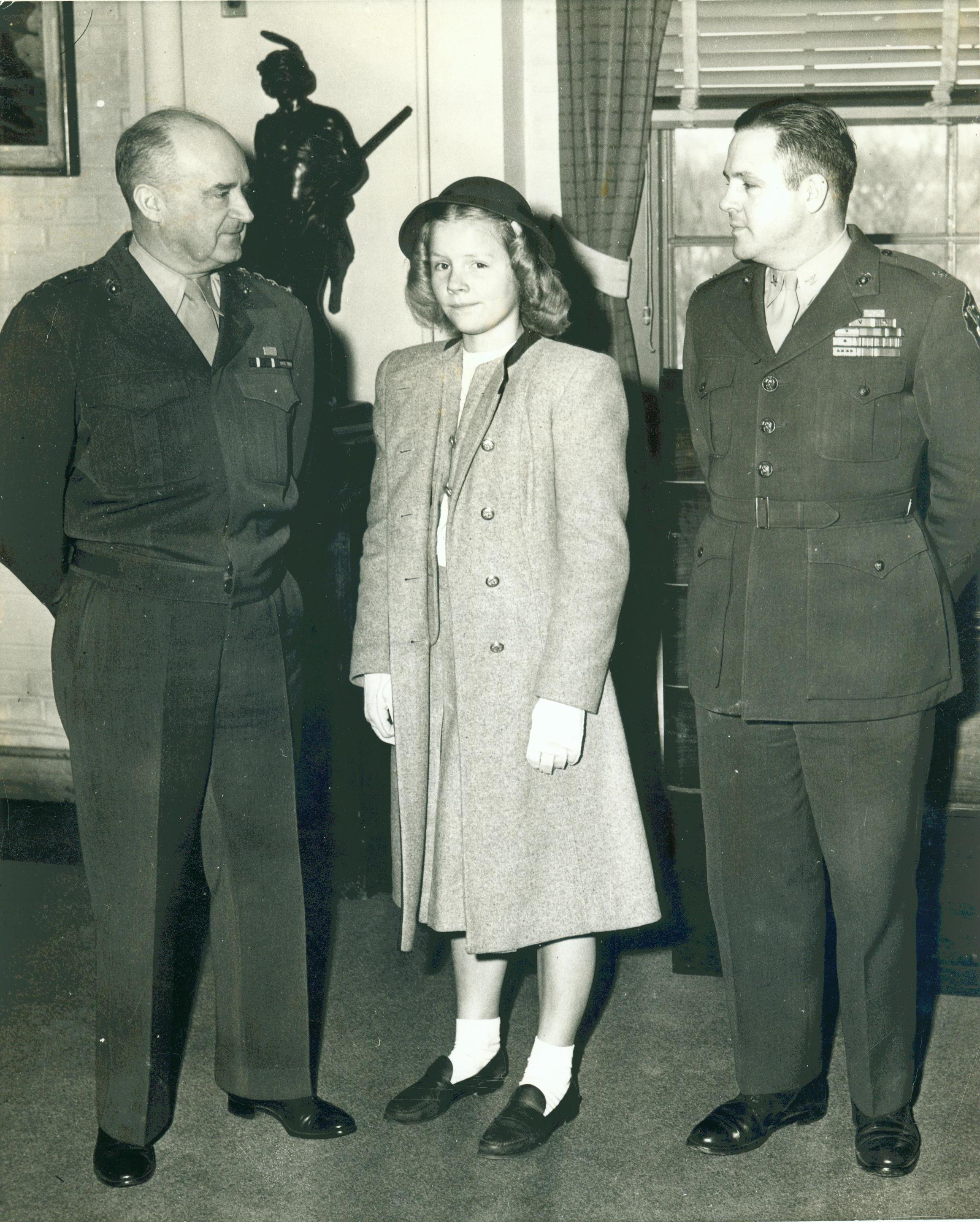
Shoup (right) with Commandant Alexander A. Vandegrift during the presentation of Medal of Honor to daughter of Alexander Bonnyman Jr., who was killed during the Battle of Tarawa, January 1947.

In August 1947, Shoup became commanding officer, Service Command, Fleet Marine Force, Pacific. In June 1949, he was assigned to the 1st Marine Division at Camp Pendleton as its chief of staff. In July 1950, he was transferred to Quantico where he served as commanding officer of the Basic School.

In April 1952, Shoup became Assistant Fiscal Director in the Office of the Fiscal Director, Headquarters Marine Corps. In this capacity, Shoup served under Major General William P. T. Hill, the Quartermaster General. Shoup was ordered by the Marine Corps Commandant General Lemuel C. Shepherd to establish a new fiscal office independent of Hill's authority. Shoup and Hill clashed frequently, but Shoup was nonetheless able to establish a new, independent Fiscal Division. He was promoted to brigadier general in April 1953, and in July he became Fiscal Director of the Marine Corps. He was involved in fiscal strategy hearings before the U.S. Congress, and established a programming system where officers researched and thought out programs before bringing them to Congress. This idea met with resistance from Marine leaders who favored going to Hill to figure out the details of programs. While serving in this capacity, he was promoted to major general in September 1955.

Shoup began a brief assignment as inspector general for recruit training in May 1956 after being ordered to do so by Commandant Randolph M. Pate following the Ribbon Creek incident, which involved the accidental drowning of six recruits during a training march. As Marine leaders were investigating, they favored Shoup's recommendation of not covering up the incident. He supported an overhaul of recruit training for the Marine Corps in response.

Following this, he served as Inspector General of the Marine Corps from September 1956 until May 1957. He returned to Camp Pendleton in June to become commanding general of the 1st Marine Division. He became commanding general of the 3rd Marine Division on Okinawa in March 1958. Following his return to the United States in May 1959, he served as commanding general of Marine Corps Recruit Depot Parris Island, until October 1959. During this time, he also served as president of the 2nd Marine Division Association.

== Commandant of the Marine Corps ==
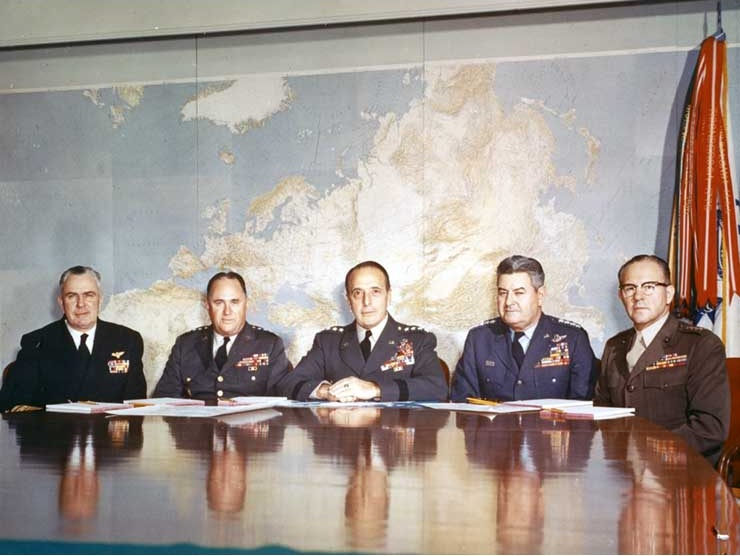
Shoup (right) with the other Joint Chiefs of Staff, 1961

While still a major general, Shoup was unexpectedly nominated to become Commandant of the Marine Corps by President Dwight D. Eisenhower at the behest of Secretary of Defense Thomas S. Gates Jr. To prepare for this duty he was promoted to lieutenant general on November 2, 1959, and briefly assigned duties as chief of staff, Headquarters Marine Corps. He was elevated to general on January 1, 1960, upon assuming the post as the 22nd Commandant of the Marine Corps. He would later serve under the administration of John F. Kennedy from 1961 to 1963, and the administration of Lyndon B. Johnson in 1963.

=== Leadership overhaul ===
By 1959, Gates and other officials viewed the Corps as fraught with internal squabbling and alienated from the other services. Because of this condition, combined with the reputation gained from the Ribbon Creek incident, it was decided that Pate needed to be replaced. Gates believed Shoup was a strong leader who could steer the Corps in the right direction. Shoup was selected over five lieutenant generals and four major generals senior to him in rank. Lieutenant General Merrill B. Twining was considered the likely appointee to the position; Lieutenant Generals Edward Pollock and Vernon E. Megee also aspired to the position of commandant. Twining openly vied for the position and retired immediately after Shoup was selected, reportedly in protest, as did several other officers. Shoup emphasized military readiness, training, and inter-service cooperation, which differed from the political climate of the time. He rapidly gained a reputation as being extremely demanding and critical of poor performance, especially by Marine generals and leaders. He was sometimes blunt in his criticism of what he saw as poorly performing officers, to the extent that some considered him a bully.

Eisenhower favored Shoup because he feared other officers spent too much time in political affairs, and felt Shoup would reduce the influence of the military industrial complex. Immediately after his appointment, Shoup sought to place new officers in key positions, in an attempt to overhaul the leadership of the Marine Corps. He and Pate disagreed over some of the new appointments, as Shoup transferred many senior officers and encouraged others to retire. Shoup later wrote he felt the Joint Chiefs of Staff had an undue weight in the direction of military strategy. He also sought to curtail politicking by lower-level Marine officers seeking career advancement.

=== Budget strategy ===
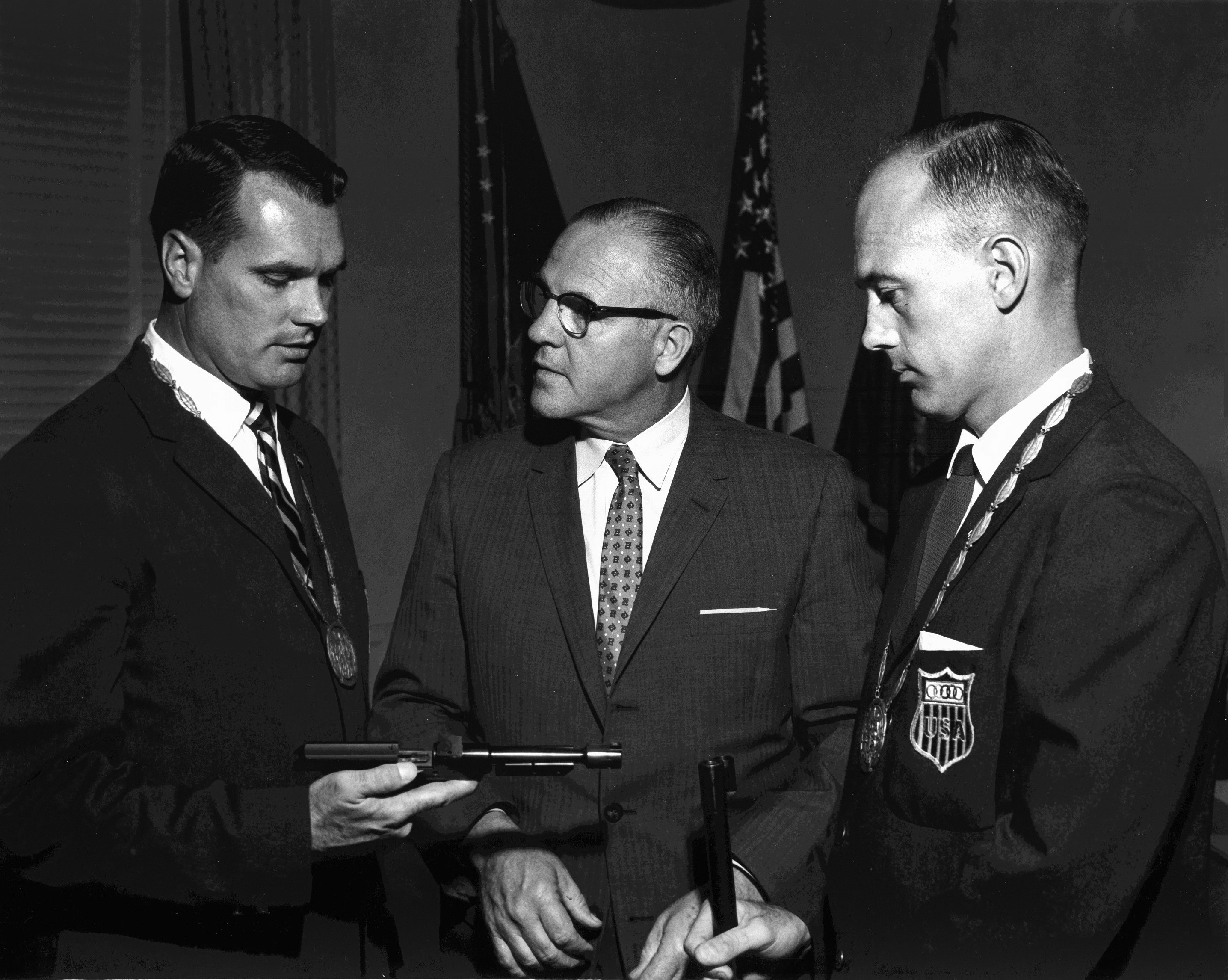
Shoup (center) congratulates Marines William McMillan and James Enoch Hill, who had won medals in the 1960 Summer Olympics.

During the first year of Shoup's service as commandant, he served under the Eisenhower administration, in which military budget policy was dominated by the "New Look" policy, under which a strong nuclear deterrent was favored over conventional warfare forces. Eisenhower focused on containment without entangling the United States in proxy wars such as the Korean War. The result of this was spending cuts and force reductions within the Marine Corps. The 1960 election of Kennedy ushered in a major change in military strategy with the adoption of the "Flexible Response" strategy, which saw a return to conventional military forces as a deterrent to nuclear war. Under the Kennedy administration there was increased civilian participation in defense policy-building, and the new secretary of defense, Robert McNamara, sought more inter-service cooperation.

Shoup favored a more frugal approach to the military budget, feeling the military was too susceptible to influence from large corporations arguing for expensive and unnecessary programs. As the Kennedy administration brought more emphasis on conventional warfare, Shoup sought to use increased funds to improve military logistics. He is credited with formulating an entirely new system of financial management, supply, and inventory management. He also created a new Data Processing Division to centralize the data processing functions of several combat service support branches.

=== Cold War conflicts ===
Shoup's outlook on Cold War conflicts was greatly influenced by his upbringing, and he was frequently an opponent of military action against the Soviet Union. He refused to fall into what he referred to as the "hate the Communists movement," indicating he would fight them if required by circumstances, but avoided undue prejudice. When U.S. Senator Strom Thurmond criticized the military for not training its troops about communism, Shoup regarded the criticism as interference. He appealed to Secretary of the Navy Fred Korth, and the matter was dropped. At the behest of the Kennedy administration, Shoup integrated counterinsurgency warfare into combat doctrine. Though he was not in favor of the idea, he appointed Major General Victor H. Krulak as an adviser on counterinsurgency.

Shoup opposed military action against Cuba, warning against any attempt to intervene militarily against Fidel Castro. He was initially not involved or aware of the plans for the Bay of Pigs invasion. He was asked by the Central Intelligence Agency (CIA) to furnish an officer, but became furious when he learned the CIA was requisitioning Marine supplies without his permission. He finally learned the intent of the CIA when the officer, Colonel Jack Hawkins, contacted him on the night of the invasion, pleading with him to appeal to Kennedy for air support. Following the failure of the operation, the Joint Chiefs of Staff were blamed, which Shoup thought was unfair, as they had not been aware of the early planning.

Shoup later warned against an armed response during the Cuban Missile Crisis, noting how difficult it would be to invade the country. Still, he prepared a team of Marines to invade Cuba should it be necessary. He and the other Joint Chiefs unanimously recommended a quick airstrike to knock out the missiles once they were discovered there. Kennedy subsequently sought Shoup's advice in evaluating the implications of the Partial Nuclear Test Ban Treaty. While his position in the Joint Chiefs of Staff was intended to be limited, he had gained Kennedy's confidence and was often called on for private consultations. Shoup supported the test ban, seeing it as a deterrent to nuclear war.

Shoup was strongly opposed to military intervention in Indochina from the beginning. In 1961, when the Pathet Lao threatened the American-backed government of Laos, he rejected calls for armed intervention. He deployed Task Unit Shufly to South Vietnam in 1962 only because he was ordered to, and cautioned against further involvement in South Vietnam, which he toured in October 1962. He opposed the Strategic Hamlet program, as well as efforts to train the Army of the Republic of Vietnam. He opposed any plans for combat in Vietnam, and later said "every responsible military man to my knowledge" was against the war as well. Shoup's staunch opposition to involvement there had a great impact on Kennedy, who, before his assassination on November 22, 1963, indicated that he wanted to end U.S. involvement in South Vietnam, seeing it as an internal struggle.

While Eisenhower appreciated Shoup's fiscal experience and apolitical outlook, Shoup was called upon most often by Kennedy. With Kennedy's relations with the Joint Chiefs of Staff strained, particularly following the Cuban Missile Crisis, he called upon Shoup privately for many consultations. Shoup's biographer Howard Jablon wrote that Shoup was Kennedy's favorite general. In turn, Shoup was the most supportive of Kennedy of all of the Joint Chiefs of Staff. Kennedy had requested Shoup to serve a second term as commandant in 1963, but Shoup declined in order to make way for the promotion of other Marine generals.

== Later life and opposition to the Vietnam War ==
Retiring from the military in December 1963, Shoup took a job at a life insurance company, but remained influential in the administration. Johnson considered taking Shoup as an adviser on a February 1964 trip to South Vietnam, but did not, either because he never made the invitation or because Shoup declined. Johnson appointed Shoup to the National Advisory Commission on Selective Service in early 1966. It disbanded on January 1, 1967, after submitting a report.

Shoup was unable to directly influence the Johnson administration, which expanded U.S. involvement in the Vietnam War. He became increasingly wary of what he felt was undue influence by the CIA and big businesses on foreign policy. In 1964 during the debate over the Gulf of Tonkin Resolution, Senator Wayne Morse wanted to call Shoup to testify against the measure, but was blocked by Senator J. William Fulbright. On May 14, 1966, Shoup began publicly attacking the policy in a speech delivered to community college students at Los Angeles Pierce College in Woodland Hills, California, for their World Affairs Day.

I believe that if we had and would keep our dirty, bloody, dollar-soaked fingers out of the business of these nations so full of depressed, exploited people, they will arrive at a solution of their own—and if unfortunately their revolution must be of the violent type because the "haves" refuse to share with the "have-nots" by any peaceful method, at least what they get will be their own, and not the American style, which they above all don't want crammed down their throats by Americans.

The forum was relatively small and initially received little publicity, but in February 1967 Shoup submitted the text of the speech to Senator Rupert Vance Hartke, who entered it into the Congressional Record. The speech grew in popularity, and Shoup did an interview for ABC News where he elaborated that, while he was not a pacifist, he felt the war was "not worth the life or limb of a single American." He remained firmly opposed to the involvement in Vietnam for the rest of his life.

Although other retired high-ranking officers, including Lieutenant General James Gavin and General Matthew Ridgway, joined Shoup in this, it was Shoup's pointed criticisms that regularly made the front pages of newspapers, because they went beyond the war to American government, business and military leadership. He feared the conflict had endangered the nation's historical identity, and argued increasing the troop levels in Vietnam would only aggravate the strategic problems there. Historian Robert Buzzanco noted that Shoup may have been the most vocal former military member to oppose the war.

Shoup argued that among the Vietnamese forces involved in the civil war there were nationalists opposed to foreign military intervention. He opposed many of the strategies associated with troop escalation, notably the air campaign over North Vietnam, which he saw as an aggressive measure causing civilian casualties that could draw the People's Republic of China or the Soviet Union into the conflict. He also feared that other American interests, including the economy, were suffering due to U.S. involvement in the war and that the U.S. was losing prestige internationally.

Shoup's opposition to the war only increased over time; he initially pushed for a negotiated settlement, but later supported a unilateral pullout from the country. As the Vietnamization strategy took effect and the U.S. increased its air operations, he remained opposed to any strategy that risked a nuclear war with China or the Soviet Union. His criticism attracted more press as the war became a stalemate. It also became highly publicized through discourse among the anti-war movement.

In 1968, in testimony before Congress, Shoup made many of the same points as he had in his 1966 speech, saying he felt opposition to the war had likely increased since then. In April 1969, along with retired Colonel James Donovan, he broadened his criticism to national security policy. In an article published in Atlantic Monthly, he accused America of becoming militaristic and aggressive, a country that was ready to "execute military contingency plans and to seek military solutions to problems of political disorder and potential Communist threats in areas of our interest." He said that anticommunism had given way to a new, aggressive defense establishment in the United States.

In a book titled Militarism U.S.A. (1970), Shoup and Donovan elaborated their criticisms. Shoup said the country was seeking military solutions to issues that could be resolved politically. He accused military leaders of propagating the war for their own career advancement, and accused the veterans group Veterans of Foreign Wars of propagandizing for the armed forces establishment. Shoup blamed the American education system for what he saw as discouraging independent thought and stressing obedience.

Shoup joined the Business Executives Move for Vietnam Peace. By 1971, Shoup publicly endorsed the anti-war veteran group Vietnam Veterans Against the War. As Vietnamization had reduced the visibility of the anti-war movement, and Shoup's criticism was not as prominent in the public arena. Fulbright and other senators urged the White House to listen to his criticisms, but Shoup's broader critique of American society and militarism was seen as more extreme than other officers who had simply criticized the strategy of the war.

Shoup's opposition to the war garnered resentment from many of the other officers in the Marine Corps, and was met with criticism that he was becoming mentally unfit or was treasonous in his actions. He was sharply criticized by journalist and former Marine Robert Heinl in several articles of the Detroit News where Heinl said Shoup was "going sour." General Rathvon M. Tompkins, one of Shoup's close friends, stopped speaking to him for several years. By December 1967, he had lost favor with the Johnson administration, his activities were monitored by the Federal Bureau of Investigation, and his patriotism was called into question in the media.

After 1971, Shoup's speaking and writing diminished, and he faded from the public eye after the U.S. military withdrawal from Vietnam in 1973. After the war, he stayed out of the public spotlight. He suffered from illness late in life, and he died on 13 January 1983 in Alexandria, Virginia. He was buried in section 7-A of Arlington National Cemetery. One of Shoup's service dress uniforms is on display at the armory of the Artillery Company of Newport in Newport, Rhode Island.

== Medal of Honor citation ==
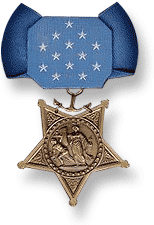

Rank and organization: Colonel, U.S. Marine Corps, commanding officer of all Marine Corps troops on Betio Island, Tarawa Atoll, and Gilbert Islands, from 20 to 22 November 1943.

The President of the United States takes pride in presenting the MEDAL OF HONOR to COLONEL DAVID M. SHOUP
UNITED STATES MARINE CORPS for service as set forth in the following CITATION:

For conspicuous gallantry and intrepidity at the risk of his life above and beyond the call of duty as commanding officer of all Marine Corps troops in action against enemy Japanese forces on Betio Island, Tarawa Atoll, Gilbert Islands, from 20 to 22 November 1943. Although severely shocked by an exploding enemy shell soon after landing at the pier and suffering from a serious, painful leg wound which had become infected, Col. Shoup fearlessly exposed himself to the terrific and relentless artillery, machine gun, and rifle fire from hostile shore emplacements. Rallying his hesitant troops by his own inspiring heroism, he gallantly led them across the fringing reefs to charge the heavily fortified island and reinforce our hard-pressed, thinly held lines. Upon arrival on shore, he assumed command of all landed troops and, working without rest under constant, withering enemy fire during the next 2 days, conducted smashing attacks against unbelievably strong and fanatically defended Japanese positions despite innumerable obstacles and heavy casualties. By his brilliant leadership, daring tactics, and selfless devotion to duty, Col. Shoup was largely responsible for the final decisive defeat of the enemy, and his indomitable fighting spirit reflects great credit upon the U.S. Naval Service.

== Awards and Decorations ==
he received the following decorations:

1st row	Medal of Honor	Navy Distinguished Service Medal	Legion of Merit with "V" Device and 5/16 inch star
2nd row	Purple Heart with 5/16 inch star	Navy Commendation Medal	Combat Action Ribbon Retroactively Awarded, 1999
3rd row	Navy Presidential Unit Citation with 1 Service star	Marine Corps Expeditionary Medal	Yangtze Service Medal
4th row	American Defense Service Medal with 'Base' clasp	American Campaign Medal	Asiatic-Pacific Campaign Medal with 4 Campaign stars
5th row	European-African-Middle Eastern Campaign Medal	World War II Victory Medal	National Defense Service Medal with 1 Service star

Distinguished Service Order

United Kingdom

== Other Honors ==
The Arleigh Burke-class destroyer USS Shoup (DDG-86) was named for Shoup in 1999

== See also ==
- List of Medal of Honor recipients for World War II

== Notes ==
=== References ===
- Alexander, Joseph H. (1993), Across the Reef: The Marine Assault of Tarawa, Ann Arbor, Michigan: University of Michigan Library, ISBN 978-1-4819-9936-6
- Anderson, David L. (2000), The Human Tradition in the Vietnam Era, Lanham, Maryland: Rowman & Littlefield, ISBN 978-0-8420-2763-2
- Banning, William (1988), Heritage Years: 2nd Marine Division Commemorative Anthology, 1940–1949, New York City, New York: Turner Publishing Company, ISBN 978-0-938021-58-2
- Douglass, James W. (2004), JFK and the Unspeakable: Why He Died and Why It Matters, New York City, New York: Touchstone Books, ISBN 978-1-4391-9388-4
- Jablon, Howard (2005), David M. Shoup: A Warrior Against War, Lanham, Maryland: Rowman & Littlefield, ISBN 978-0-7425-4487-1
- Mikaelian, Allen (2003), Medal of Honor: Profiles of America's Military Heroes From the Civil War to the Present, New York City, New York: Hyperion Books, ISBN 978-0-7868-8576-3
- Millett, Allan Reed; Shulimson, Jack (2004), Commandants of the Marine Corps, Annapolis, Maryland: Naval Institute Press, ISBN 978-0-87021-012-9
- Rogers, Daniel E. "Combat Leadership amid Chaos." Naval History 32, 6 (December 2018), 12–17 (concerning Shoup at Tarawa).
- Schlosser, Eric (2013), Command and Control: Nuclear Weapons, the Damascus Accident, and the Illusion of Safety, London, United Kingdom: Penguin Group, ISBN 978-1-59420-227-8
- Simmons, Edwin H. (2003), The United States Marines: A History, Annapolis, Maryland: Naval Institute Press, ISBN 978-1-55750-868-3
- Tucker, Spencer (2011), The Encyclopedia of the Vietnam War: A Political, Social, and Military History, Santa Barbara, California: ABC-CLIO, ISBN 978-1-85109-960-3

Military offices
Preceded by Randolph M. Pate	Commandant of the Marine Corps; 1960–1963	Succeeded by Wallace M. Greene Jr.
