= AFL–CIO Department of Research =

The AFL–CIO Department of Research performed research to support the political, economic, and legislative goals of the AFL–CIO. While many of the member unions of the AFL–CIO had their own research departments, the national Department of Research focused on providing data and analysis to support the national organization's policy positions. (Despite its name, the Department of Research was not one of the AFL–CIO's constitutionally-mandated trade and industrial departments (groups of member unions with common interests, such as the Building and Construction Trades Department).)

== History ==
The Department of Research was established in 1955 with the merger of the American Federation of Labor and the Congress of Industrial Organizations into the AFL–CIO; previously, both organizations had operated separate research departments.

As described in a 1962 article by then-head Stanley H. Ruttenberg, the national headquarters' Department of Research was responsible for "reporting and analyzing developments in economics, collective bargaining and some allied subjects for AFL–CIO officers, committees, departments, and affiliates." In 1962, the department consisted of eleven staff members (8 professional and 3 "semi-professional"), each of whom was assigned to one or more areas of specialty. Staff provided data and analysis to support the AFL–CIO's policy positions, and also represented these policy decisions to other government, public, and private groups associated with organized labor. They worked in close cooperation with the legislative staff.

In 1981, the name of the department was changed to the Economic Research Department.

== Personnel ==
Stanley Ruttenberg served as the Director of Research from 1955 to 1963, when he was appointed special assistant to the secretary of labor by Lyndon B. Johnson. He was succeeded by Nathaniel Goldfinger, who was Director from 1963 until his death in July 1976. Upon Goldfinger's death, Rudy Oswald became the Director.

Frank Fernbach served as an economist with the department from 1856 to 1962, and as assistant director starting in 1962.
