= Millstone (disambiguation) =

A millstone is a stone used in gristmills, for grinding wheat or other grains.

Millstone may also refer to:

== Media ==
- "Millstone", a song on Brand New's 2006 album The Devil and God Are Raging Inside Me
- "Millstone", a song on Eisley's 2013 album Currents
- The Millstone (novel), a novel by Margaret Drabble

== Places ==
- Millstone Nuclear Power Plant, the only nuclear power generation site in Connecticut
- Millstone River, a 38.6-mile-long (62.1-kilometer) tributary of the Raritan River in central New Jersey
- Millstone Township, New Jersey, a township in Monmouth County, New Jersey, United States
- Millstone, Mercer County, New Jersey, an unincorporated community located within East Windsor Township in Mercer County, New Jersey, United States
- Millstone, New Jersey, a borough in Somerset County, New Jersey, United States
- Millstone Township, Pennsylvania, a township in Elk County, Pennsylvania, United States

== Other ==
- Battle of Millstone, battle during the American Revolution
- James Millstone (1930–1992), American journalist and editor
- Millstone Coffee, a brand of coffee sold in the US
- Millstone Grit, any of a number of coarse-grained sandstones of Carboniferous age which occur in the British Isles
- Millstone Hill, a fully steerable dish antenna

== See also ==
- Grindstone, a round sharpening stone used for grinding or sharpening ferrous tools
