= The Cougar (newspaper) =

Student newspaper at the University of Houston

- The September 27, 2007 issue of The Daily Cougar.
- Type: Student newspaper
- Format: Tabloid
- Owner: Department of Student Publications (Independent student organization)
- Editor-in-chief: Gauraangi Gupta
- Founded: 1928
- Political alignment: Independent
- Headquarters: 4465 University Dr. Room N221, SC North; University of Houston; Houston, TX 77204
- Circulation: ~12,000 Bi-weekly
- Website: thedailycougar.com

The Cougar is a weekly newspaper run entirely by students at the University of Houston.

In publication since April 6, 1928, The Cougar was originally named The Cougar but was renamed The Daily Cougar and again renamed The Cougar in the fall of 2014 when the print edition turned weekly. The Cougar operates as a student-managed, school-funded forum for the university community.

The Cougar publishes on Wednesday during the school year, but stories are added daily to its website presence.

== History ==
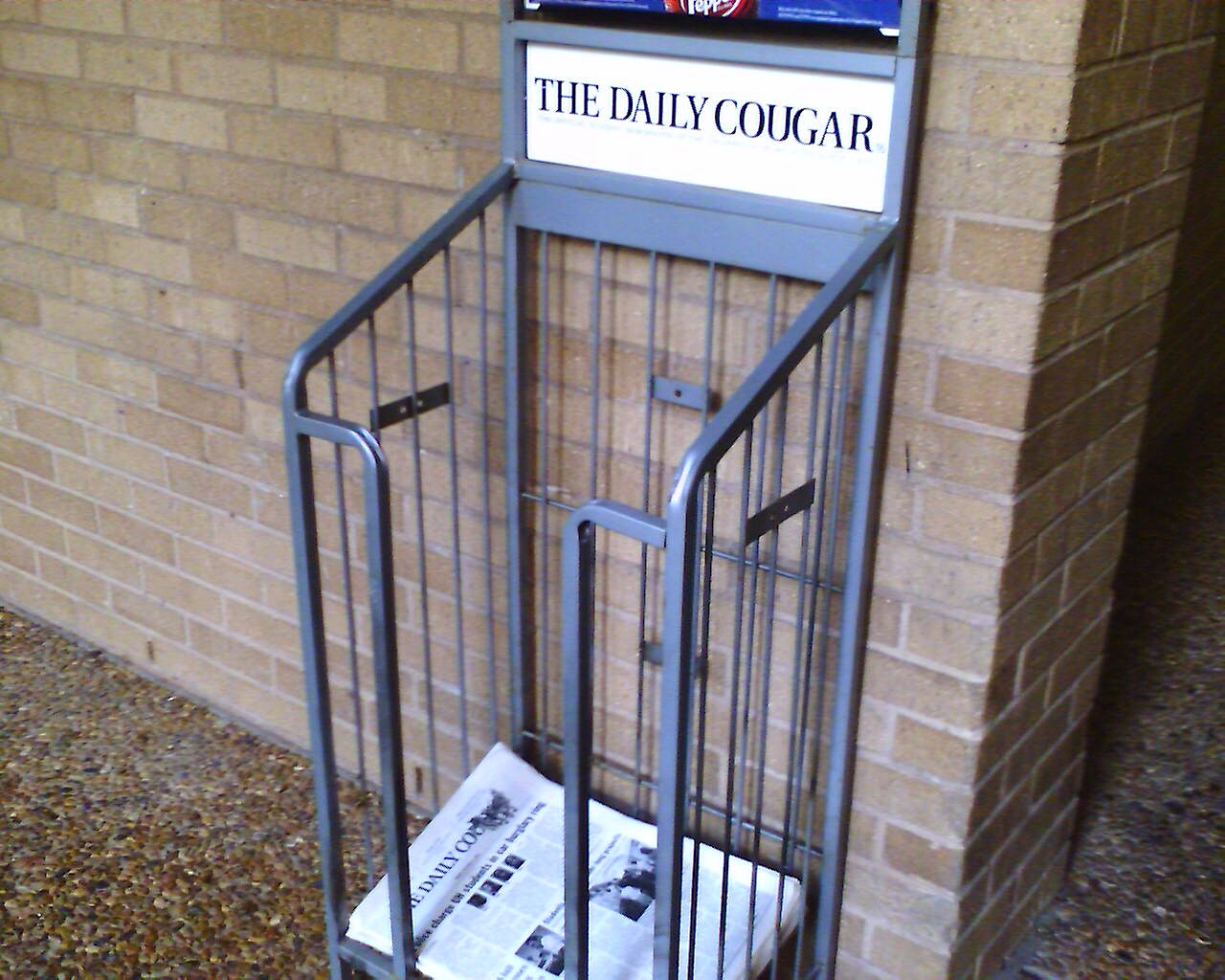
A Daily Cougar distribution stand on the University of Houston campus

The newspaper was founded in 1928 by University of Houston students as The Cougar. By the 1950s, circulation had increased to 6,800. In 1965, the paper began a press run of four days a week with a release schedule of Tuesday through Friday. On March 27, 1978, the newspaper added Mondays to its release schedule, and was renamed to The Daily Cougar.

As of 2003, The Cougar was Houston's second largest English-language daily newspaper, with a circulation of nearly 12,000 and a readership approaching 40,000.

== Awards ==
- 2016:
  - Associated Collegiate Press Newspaper Pacemaker Award Winner
- 2016:
  - Houston Press Club 2016 Lone Star Awards - Best Student Newspaper winner
- 2004:
  - Columbia Scholastic Press Association Gold Circle Award - certificate of merit, Single Page Color Photo Layout
  - Columbia Scholastic Press Association Gold Circle Award - certificate of merit, Tabloid Feature Page Design for Newspapers
  - Columbia Scholastic Press Association Gold Circle Award - first place, General Feature in Newspapers
- 2002:
- 2001:
  - Columbia Scholastic Press Association Gold Circle Award - first place, Newspaper Tabloid Overall Design
- 1999:
  - Associated Collegiate Press Newspaper of the Year - third place
- 1996:
  - Columbia Scholastic Press Association - Gold medalist, spring 1996
  - Columbia Scholastic Press Association - Gold medalist, fall 1995
- 1994:
  - Columbia Scholastic Press Association - medalist, fall 1994
  - Columbia Scholastic Press Association - medalist, spring 1994
- 1993:
  - Society of Professional Journalists Region 8 Mark of Excellence Awards, first place, Feature Writing
  - Society of Professional Journalists Region 8 Mark of Excellence Awards, third place, In-Depth Reporting
- 1992:
  - Columbia Scholastic Press Association - first place, fall 1992
  - Columbia Scholastic Press Association medalist, spring 1992
  - Columbia Scholastic Press Association Gold Circle Award - first place, Page One Design
  - Columbia Scholastic Press Association Gold Circle Award - second place, Editorial Writing
- 1991:
  - Associated Collegiate Press - first class honor rating, 1991-1992

== Notable alumni ==
- Dan Cook
- Saul Friedman
- Jack Valenti
- Welcome W. Wilson, Sr.
- Donald Barthelme
- Adrees Latif - 2008 Pulitzer Prize
