= Georg Fischer =

Georg Fischer may refer to:

- Georg Fischer (skier) (born 1960), West German cross-country skier and biathlete
- Georg Fischer (politician), German politician
- Georg Fischer (company), a Swiss manufacturing company

== See also ==
- George Fischer (disambiguation)
- George Fisher (disambiguation)
