= Duscha =

Duscha is a German-language surname of Slavic origin (Polish dusza="soul"). Notable people with the surname include:

- Ina Duscha (born 1935), Austrian film actress
- Julius Duscha (1924–2015), American journalist
