= Russell D. Hemenway =

American political activist (1925–2014)

- Hemenway in 1978
- Born: March 24, 1925 or March 25, 1925 (Note: Sources vary on the exact date of his birth. His 2014 obituaries in The Washington Post and the Daily Freeman give the date as March 24 and March 25, respectively.); Leominster, Massachusetts
- Died: February 14, 2014 (aged 88); Rhinebeck, New York
- Education: Dartmouth College; Institut d'études politiques de Paris
- Organization(s): National Committee for an Effective Congress; Fund for Peace
- Known for: Political activism
- Political party: Democratic Party
- Board member of: National Security Archive; The Fund for Constitutional Government
- Spouse: Catherine Casey (married 1951–1999)

Russell D. Hemenway (March 24 or 25, 1925 – January 30, 2014) was an American political activist. He is most well-known for his activities with the National Committee for an Effective Congress, a political action committee that he served as the national director of from 1966 until his death. As the head of that organization for almost 50 years, he supported liberal and progressive candidates for United States Congress and advocated for campaign finance reform. He was also involved in other nonprofit organizations, serving as the chairman of the board for both The Fund for Constitutional Government and the National Security Archive and a trustee for the Fund for Peace. Concerning his political impact, journalist Michael Tomasky said that he was "one of the great unheralded liberal operatives of the last 50 years in American politics".

== Early history ==
Russell D. Hemenway was born on either March 24 or 25, 1925, in Leominster, Massachusetts, to Alan E. Hemenway and Bess Hemenway, a White Anglo-Saxon Protestant family. He had one brother and one sister. He enrolled at Dartmouth College, but as a freshman, he was drafted into the United States Navy. During World War II, he was stationed aboard the USS Pittsburgh. Following the war, he returned to Dartmouth, graduating in 1949. Following this, he continued his education at the Institut d'études politiques de Paris. Following his education, he worked for the United States Foreign Service, which saw him travel to both France and Greece. While living in Paris, he became friends with several influential authors, including Harold L. Humes, Norman Mailer, Peter Matthiessen, and George Plimpton. Between 1951 and 1953, he was stationed in Athens, where he evaluated postwar economic recovery efforts in the country.

== Political activism ==
While working with the Foreign Service in Paris, Hemenway met American politician Adlai Stevenson II, a member of the Democratic Party who would later serve as the party's nominee for president in the 1952 and 1956 presidential elections, who recommended that he become involved in politics. Hemenway, acting on Stevenson's advice, became politically active upon returning to the United States. He took up residence in New York City in the mid-1950s, where he worked as an investment broker and became active in local Democratic Party politics. Also during this time, he served as the director of the local offices of the state's department of commerce. His first foray into political activism began when he joined the Lexington Democratic Club, a reform organization opposed to the dominant faction of the city's Democratic Party. Within the club, he helped find candidates who could challenge those supported by Tammany Hall. He eventually became the president of this club and was later elected to serve as the executive director for the New York Committee for Democratic Voters, another reform group. During this time, Hemenway became a critic of the radical right, largely opposed to the politics of Senator Joseph McCarthy. In 1963, he attended the March on Washington.

During the 1960s, Hemenway served on the campaigns of several Democratic politicians seeking their party's nomination for the presidency. During the 1960 Democratic Party presidential primaries, he campaigned for Stevenson, who was at the time seeking a third nomination. However, the nomination was ultimately won by John F. Kennedy. Years later, in 1968, he was an early supporter of Senator Eugene McCarthy, though Vice President Hubert Humphrey ultimately won that year's Democratic Party presidential primaries. During that election, Hemenway was a guest at the Ambassador Hotel in Los Angeles when Democratic presidential candidate Robert F. Kennedy was assassinated in the hotel.

=== National Committee for an Effective Congress ===
In 1966, Hemenway moved from New York City to Washington, D.C. to become the director of the National Committee for an Effective Congress (NCEC). The NCEC is a liberal political action committee (PAC) that had been established by Eleanor Roosevelt in 1948 to counter the rise of the radical right in American politics, promoting liberal and progressive candidates for United States Congress. Several year's prior to becoming the PAC's leader, Hemenway had been Roosevelt's chaperone during the 1960 Democratic National Convention.

Under his leadership, the group advocated for campaign finance reform and for the creation of the Federal Election Commission, which was established in 1971. During the 1970s, the group developed new strategies for targeting, and over the course of his leadership, Hemenway served as an advisor for thousands of political candidates. The NCEC was a major supporter of the Federal Election Campaign Act, which was first brought before Congress in 1971. The act sought to regulate federal campaign finance by requiring certain disclosures. Multiple sources attribute the passage of the act to the efforts of both Hemenway and the NCEC, with the Daily Freeman calling Hemenway "the father of campaign finance disclosure reform in the early 70's".

By 1976, the NCEC was so influential in politics that the National Observer called them "perhaps the most powerful political force in this country". As director of the NCEC, Hemenway was a vocal critic of the Vietnam War and President Richard Nixon, prompting Charles Colson, an advisor to the president, to add him to Nixon's list of political opponents.

=== Later political activity ===
In 1978, Hemenway was a candidate for a seat in the United States House of Representatives representing New York's 18th congressional district. The seat had previously been held by Democrat Ed Koch, who vacated it to become mayor of New York City. Running as a Democrat, he vied for the party's nomination against fellow political activists Bella Abzug and Allard K. Lowenstein. Abzug ultimately won the party's nomination, though she lost the general election to Republican Bill Green.

By the 2010s, in addition to his leadership of the NCEC, he was also a chairman of the board for both the National Security Archive (an independent research institute at George Washington University) and The Fund for Constitutional Government, an anti-corruption group founded by philanthropist Stewart Rawlings Mott. He was also a trustee for the Fund for Peace, which had been an initial fiscal sponsor of the archive. In 2014, Tomasky called Hemenway "one of the great behind-the-scenes politicos of our time" and "one of the great unheralded liberal operatives of the last 50 years in American politics".

== Personal life and death ==
In 1951, while in Paris, he married Catherine Casey. The two would remain married until her death in 1999. The couple had a daughter and a son, and by the 2010s, Hemenway had several grandchildren. Hemenway maintained residences in both Rhinebeck, New York, and Manhattan.

Hemenway died on January 30, 2014, at his home in Rhinebeck. His family did not make his cause of death public. At the time of his death, he was still serving as the national director for the NCEC, as well as chairman of the board for the National Security Archive. A memorial service was held at Saint Thomas Church in Manhattan on February 14.

== Bibliography ==
- Hemenway, Russell D. (1975). "Reforming the Political Money Game". In Hiebert, Ray E.; Jones, Robert F.; Lorenz, John d'Arc; Lotito, Ernest A. (eds.). The Political Image Merchants: Strategies for the Seventies. Washington, D.C.: Acropolis Books. pp. 137–139. ISBN 978-0-87491-157-2. OCLC 1121014.

== Sources ==
- Bernstein, Adam (January 31, 2014). "Russell D. Hemenway, legislative reformer, dies at 88". The Washington Post. ISSN 0190-8286. OCLC 2269358. Archived from the original on June 1, 2020.
- Blanton, Tom (February 14, 2014). "Russell Hemenway: An Appreciation". National Security Archive. Archived from the original on July 7, 2024.
- Carroll, Maurice (February 16, 1978). "Green Thanks Voters for Victory But Mrs. Abzug Isn't Conceding". The New York Times. p. 10. ISSN 0362-4331. OCLC 1645522. Archived from the original on May 16, 2025.
- "Russell D. Hemenway". Daily Freeman. 21st Century Media. February 8, 2014. Archived from the original on May 6, 2025.
- Martin, Douglas (February 5, 2014). "Russell Hemenway, Champion of Reformist Politics, Dies at 88". The New York Times. ISSN 1553-8095. OCLC 1645522. Archived from the original on June 23, 2024.
- "Remembering National Director Russell Hemenway". National Committee for an Effective Congress. December 30, 2014. Archived from the original on January 21, 2025.
- "Burden to Seek Koch House Seat". The New York Times. January 12, 1978. p. 3. ISSN 0362-4331. OCLC 1645522. Archived from the original on May 16, 2025.
- Romano, Lois (May 19, 1983). "Liberal Survivors' Soirée". The Washington Post. ISSN 0190-8286. OCLC 2269358. Archived from the original on August 28, 2017.
- Tomasky, Michael (March 3, 2014). "The Great Russ Hemenway". The Daily Beast. IAC Inc. Archived from the original on August 13, 2020.
