= Sahar Habib Ghazi =

Multimedia journalist, editor and podcaster

Sahar Habib Ghazi is a media strategist, trainer and a journalist. She was the Managing Editor at Global Voices from 2014 to 2018 and she was a 2011 John S. Knight Journalism Fellow at Stanford University. She has spent over 15 years leading teams in national and international broadcast and digital newsrooms. Ghazi has worked as a journalist in Pakistan where she helped launch the country's first English language TV channel DawnNews and produced a TV series on US-Pakistan relations, called the Disposable Ally.

== Education ==
Ghazi holds a degree in Economics and Political Science from the University of Michigan.

She attended Stanford University in 2010-2011 as a Knight Journalism Fellow.

== Career ==
Ghazi served as the Managing Editor of Global Voices, an international and multilingual community of bloggers, journalists, translators, academics, and human rights activists, from 2012. At GV her focus was on creating "strategies to facilitate and support our unique, borderless community and completely virtual newsroom' and helping to 'craft editorial and social media policies, plan special coverage and manage partnerships'.

In November 2015, she joined the Governing Board of Pakistani media development non-profit organisation, Media Matters for Democracy.

Ghazi's work as a journalist started in Pakistan, where she covered worked for a number of broadcast newsrooms, including Geo News. In 2006, she helped launch the country's first English-language TV station Dawn News.

In 2009, Ghazi produced a TV series on US-Pakistan relations, called the Disposable Ally.

In 2011, Ghazi was a Knight Journalism Fellow at Stanford University and a managing editor, where she explored creating citizen-generated content for mainstream media in Pakistan. There she also trained herself in design thinking, leadership and entrepreneurship.

Ghazi's work has appeared in multiple national and international journalistic outlets including The New York Times, Dawn, Dawn News TV and Geo News TV.

== Awards ==
Ghazi was a Stanford JSK Journalism fellow in 2010-2011, where she studied entrepreneurship, human-centered design, and innovation in journalism. As a Knight Fellow, she worked on a project to "bridge Pakistan's digital divide by using online communities to produce crowd-sourced reporting that is then syndicated to broadcast outlets, which are the primary source of news in Pakistan", which culminated as Hosh Media, a website that aimed to create "a space in Pakistan’s mainstream media for young bloggers and online activists".

Ghazi served on the three-member jury of the first-ever Pakistan Data Journalism Awards contest in 2019.
