= James Deakin (journalist) =

American journalist

James Deakin (1929-2007) was an American journalist and TV host.

== Biography ==
Deakin was born in St. Louis and received his degree from Washington University in St. Louis. In 1951, he joined the St. Louis Post-Dispatch and worked as a white house correspondent. In 1954, he was appointed to the Washington Bureau during the Eisenhower administration. Deakin studied and reported the administrations of John F. Kennedy, Lyndon Johnson and Richard Nixon. From 1958 to 1980, Deakin covered the White House. In 1981, he retired from The Post-Dispatch and ended up teaching courses in journalism at George Washington University until 1987.

== Publications ==
He wrote a critical report about lobbying and Lyndon B. Johnson entitled "Lyndon Johnson's Credibility Gap." He was also critical of the Nixon Administration, which landed him on the master list of Nixon political opponents. One of his most well-known book was "Straight Stuff: The Reporters, The White House and the Truth".

== Family ==
Deakin was married to his wife Doris and together they had a son named David, and two grandsons.

== Sources ==
- Staff report (February 17, 2005). Deakin delivers talk on Nixon Administration. The Missouri Miner
