= Warren Unna =

American journalist

Warren W. Unna (September 14, 1923 – February 9, 2017) was an American journalist.

A 1943 graduate of the University of California (Berkeley) in international relations, he joined the San Francisco Chronicle. He joined The Washington Post in 1952. His work as a reporter for The Washington Post landed him on the master list of Nixon political opponents.

He was later Post bureau chief in New Delhi (1965–1967). In 1971 he joined the Calcutta-based The Statesman as its Washington-based correspondent, working in that role for some two decades.

He retired to Mitchellville, Maryland, and died in February 2017 at the age of 93.
