= Lawrence G. Chait =

- Born: June 27, 1917
- Died: July 18, 1997 (aged 80); Croydon, New Hampshire, U.S.
- Occupation: Advertising executive
- Known for: Pioneering mail order and direct marketing
- Spouse: Sylvia Levine Chait (died 1996)
- Children: 3

Lawrence G. Chait (June 27, 1917 – July 18, 1997) was an American advertising executive and a pioneer in mail order and direct marketing. He served as the chairman of Lawrence G. Chait & Co., Inc., and was President of the Direct Marketing Club of New York. His political activities landed him on the master list of Nixon's political opponents.

== Early life and education ==
Lawrence G. Chait was born in Scranton, Pennsylvania, on June 27, 1917. He served as a Merchant Marine during World War II.

== Personal life ==
Chait died of a heart attack on July 18, 1997. He married his wife, Sylvia Levine Chait, in 1938. They had two daughters, Martha L. Berlin and Pamela A. Chait, and a son, George Chait.

== Publications ==
- Building Business by Mail, 1977
- Chait, L. (1968). An Executive Looks At—Marketing in the Money Card Society. California Management Review
