= Ralph Weller =

Ralph A. Weller (8 September 1921 – March 30, 1995) was president of Otis Elevator Company. His political views and activism landed him on the master list of Nixon political opponents.

During his tenure at the helm of Otis, Weller gained prominence as a business statesman/trade expansionist through his leadership in various programs sponsored by the National Association of Manufacturers (NAM) International Economic Affairs Committee. For example, in November 1974 Weller co-chaired the NAM's Industrial Mission to the Mid-East- The project mission visited Iran, Saudi Arabia, Kuwait, Egypt and Algeria- with twelve chief executives representing a diverse cross-section of US industrial and agricultural corporations. The mission's findings were published by NAM and helped strengthen US business presence in the region through expanded trade and investment

He was president of Otis when United Technologies waged a stock buyout in 1975.

He graduated from Virginia Military Institute and Harvard Business School.
