= Erwin Knoll =

American journalist (1931–1994)

Erwin Knoll (1931 – November 2, 1994) was an American journalist who was editor of The Progressive from 1973 to 1994.

== Early life ==
Knoll was born in Austria, into a Jewish family, and as a child fled from the Nazis. He later came to New York City as a refugee. As a student journalist, Knoll got into highly controversial debates with conservatives. He became a U.S. citizen in 1946.

== Career ==
Knoll began his journalistic career working with The Washington Post, and from 1963 to 1968 was the White House Correspondent for the Newhouse National News Service.

Knoll's work landed him on Richard Nixon's master list of political opponents.

Knoll joined The Progressive as Washington editor in 1968. He became editor of the magazine five years later, moving to Madison, Wisconsin, where the magazine was based. He remained editor for 21 years, until his death in 1994. Knoll described the magazine as the "ecumenical journal of the American left".

Knoll was well known as "a celebrated and outspoken defender of free speech and a staunch opponent of militarism". In 1979, soon after Knoll took over The Progressive, the magazine became the first publication to be ordered not to print an article by a federal court due to national security. The article was titled "The H-Bomb Secret, How We Got It – Why We're Telling It". Judge Robert W. Warren of the U.S. District Court in Milwaukee enjoined publication, but the U.S. Department of Justice dropped the action after a local newspaper, the Madison Press Connection, "printed a letter that the Government said also contained secret information about the bomb".

Speaking to the House of Delegates of the American Bar Association in Chicago in January 1982, Attorney General William French Smith referred to the epigram "Everything you read in the newspapers is absolutely true except for the rare story of which you happen to have firsthand knowledge" as "Knoll's law of media accuracy". The adage is similar to what has later been referred to as the "Gell-Mann amnesia effect".

Knoll was against the Strategic Defense Initiative, arguing in 1983 that the Reagan Administration's assertion that SDI could be the "key to a decent, humane and peaceful future" was "to tell the biggest lie".

In the 1980s, Knoll also regularly appeared on the TV program The MacNeil Lehrer Newshour.

Knoll caused some controversy by opposing the First Gulf War.

== Death ==
Knoll died at the age of 63 on November 2, 1994, in his sleep, following a heart attack, at his home in Madison, Wisconsin.
