= Raymond Lapin =

American mortgage banking executive

- Born: Raymond H. "Ray" Lapin; 13 February 1919
- Died: 2 April 1986 (aged 67)

Raymond H. Lapin (13 February 1919 – 2 April 1986) was an American mortgage banking executive known as the father of the secondary mortgage market. He served under President Lyndon B. Johnson as creator and first president of the Government National Mortgage Association (GINNIE MAE) and the Federal National Mortgage Association (Fannie Mae) from 1967 to 1969.

Lapin earned his bachelor's degree from University of California at Berkeley in 1942 and MBA from University of Chicago in 1954. He founded Bankers Mortgage Co. in 1954, which was sold to Transamerica Corporation in 1963.

Because of his connections with Johnson, he made the master list of Nixon political opponents.

Lapin died of complications from heart disease at Marin General Hospital in Greenbrae, California.
