= Robert Sherrill =

American investigative journalist (1924–2014)

- Born: December 24, 1924; Frogtown, Georgia, U.S.
- Died: August 19, 2014 (aged 89); Tallahassee, Florida, U.S.
- Education: University of Texas at Austin
- Occupation: Investigative journalist

Robert Glenn Sherrill (December 24, 1924 – August 19, 2014) was an American investigative journalist and longtime contributor to The Nation, Texas Observer, and many other magazines over the years including Playboy, the New Republic and the New York Times Magazine.

== Early life ==
Sherrill was born in Frogtown, Georgia, and served on a merchant ship off Japan at the end of World War II. He was educated at the University of Texas at Austin.

== Career ==
Sherrill taught English at schools including Texas A&M University. A lasting influence was the Syracuse University philosopher Thomas Vernor Smith who preached a commitment to public service.

Sherrill was a reporter for the Miami Herald, the Austin American-Statesman, and the weekly Texas Observer. In 1968, he signed the "Writers and Editors War Tax Protest" pledge, vowing to refuse tax payments in protest against the Vietnam War. As the Washington Correspondent and then Corporations Correspondent for The Nation, his efforts landed him on the master list of Nixon's political opponents. He also worked for I. F. Stone as a staff writer for his weekly, but soon parted ways.

The Secret Service banned him from the White House for "posing a physical threat to the president".

"During Lyndon Johnson’s presidency, the Secret Service denied clearance to Robert Sherrill, a reporter for The Nation who had gotten into physical fights with government officials."

In his later years, Sherrill principally wrote reviews of books about politics and corporate greed, and two reviews antagonized the gay community. In his review of Nicholas von Hoffman's biography of Roy Cohn, Citizen Cohn, he showed no sympathy for Cohn's death from AIDS and in his 1982 favorable review of God's Bullies, he said he preferred to call the author "queer" rather than use the author's own description of himself as "gay." That caused an outcry, Sherrill did not apologize and added "I grew up thinking the word [gay] meant happy. For a group to seize the word and apply it to themselves is somewhat grotesque."

Sherrill's 1987 article for The New York Times Magazine, "Can Miami Save Itself", caused a firestorm of factual challenges by Miami officials and Cuban Americans, prompting a 304-word Editor's Note from The New York Times.

Sherrill authored several books on politics and society, including his Hubert Humphrey biography The Drugstore Liberal (1968), Military Justice Is To Justice as Military Music Is To Music (1970), The Saturday Night Special (1973), The Last Kennedy (1976) and The Oil Follies of 1970-1980: How the Petroleum Industry Stole the Show (And Much More Besides) (1983). His biography of Lyndon Johnson, The Accidental President had a run on the best seller list. He also wrote Gothic Politics in the Deep South and the textbook Why They Call it Politics: A Guide to America's Government.

== Court case ==
A decision in 1977 by the United States Court of Appeals for the District of Columbia Circuit with regard to a civil suit filed by Sherrill against the U.S. Secret Service said that to ensure due process the revocation of a White House press pass must be accompanied by a written decision. It reads, in part:

"[...D]enial of a White House press pass to a bona fide journalist violates the first amendment unless it furthers a compelling governmental interest identified by narrowly and specifically drawn standards. [....A]ppellants must publish or otherwise make publicly known the actual standard employed in determining whether an otherwise eligible journalist will obtain a White House press pass. [...N]otice, opportunity to rebut, and a written decision are required because the denial of a pass potentially infringes upon first amendment guarantees. Such impairment of this interest cannot be permitted to occur in the absence of adequate procedural due process."

== Personal life and death ==
Sherrill resided in Washington, D.C., and he retired in Tallahassee, Florida. He died in Tallahassee on August 19, 2014.
