= National Convocation on the Challenge of Building Peace =

American anti-war organization

The National Convocation on the Challenge of Building Peace was an American organization formed in the late 1960s in response to the Vietnam War. The organization made the master list of Nixon political opponents. The first meeting, sponsored by the Fund for Education in World Order, was held on March 5, 1969, in New York City. They held their second meeting in 1970 in New York City, and had annual meetings beginning in 1986.

== Convocations ==
- 1st: New York Hilton Hotel, New York City, New York, March 1969
- 2nd: New York Hilton Hotel, New York City, New York, April 29–30, 1970
- 3rd: Hotel Americana, New York City, New York, October 1971
