= Robert Healy (journalist) =

American journalist

Robert L. Healy (July 2, 1925 – June 5, 2010) was an American journalist. He was born in Boston, Massachusetts.

== Career ==
In the early 1940s, Healy started his career as a copy boy working for The Boston Globe and eventually worked his way up to becoming the executive editor. He worked as an editor from 1969 to 1979. His responsibility included helping with the paper's daily operation. He was also the Washington Bureau Chief of The Boston Globe. Healy was a World War II veteran and covered the Vietnam War. His work landed him on the master list of Nixon political opponents. Healy also wrote a column for many years called, Political Circuit.

Healy was credited for disarming Sirhan Sirhan with kicking the gun out of his hands shortly after the assassination of Robert F. Kennedy.

In 1962, Healy nearly ended Edward M. Kennedy's first United States Senate campaign. Healy released information that the candidate was expelled as an undergraduate from Harvard for cheating on an exam.

== Awards and honors ==
Healy was a part of a team with The Boston Globe that won its first Pulitzer Prize for Public Service. They won the prize from their work on the Boston Municipal Court Judge Francis X. Morrissey's nomination to federal bench.

== Family ==
Healy's father worked for The Boston Globe for over 50 years as a mailer. Healy was married to Janet Rush, and they had 8 children and 17 grandchildren. However, that marriage ended in a divorce. He later wed Mary Healy, and they were married for 32 years.

== Death ==
Healy died from a stroke on June 5, 2010, at his home in Jupiter, Florida. He was 84.

== Sources ==
- Staff report (June 19, 1996). Interview with Robert Healy Frontline
