= William Hines (journalist) =

American journalist (1916–2005)

William M. Hines (September 11, 1916 – February 28, 2005) was an American journalist. According to his Washington Post obituary, he was considered "the godfather of NASA space reporting."

He attended Guilford College but left for a job at the Chattanooga Times. He served as a first lieutenant in the United States Army during World War II. He worked briefly in The Pentagon's information office before joining the Washington Star as a reporter and later becoming Sunday editor.

His critical coverage of the Apollo 1 fire in 1967 led to reforms at NASA. His Washington reporting landed him on the master list of Nixon political opponents.

He left the Star in 1968 for the Chicago Daily News and later became Washington bureau chief of the Chicago Sun-Times. He retired from the Sun-Times in 1989.
