= Sydney J. Harris =

American journalist (1917–1986)

Sydney J. Harris (September 14, 1917 – December 7, 1986) was an American journalist for the Chicago Daily News and, later, the Chicago Sun-Times. He wrote 11 books and his weekday column, "Strictly Personal", was syndicated in approximately 200 newspapers throughout the United States and Canada. He also wrote an aperiodic feature called "Things I Learned En Route to Looking Up Other Things".

== Biography ==
Sydney Justin Harris was born in London, but his family moved to the United States when he was five years old. Harris grew up in Chicago, where he spent the rest of his life. He attended high school with Saul Bellow, who was his lifelong friend. In 1934, at age 17, Harris began his newspaper career with the Chicago Herald and Examiner. He became a drama critic (1941) and a columnist for the Chicago Daily News (1944). He held those positions until the paper's demise in 1978 and continued to write his column for its sister paper, the Chicago Sun-Times, until his death in 1986.

Harris's politics were considered liberal and his work landed him on the master list of Nixon political opponents. He spoke in favor of women's rights and civil rights. His last column was an essay against capital punishment.

Harris often used aphorisms in his writings, such as this excerpt from Pieces of Eight (1982): "Superior people are only those who let it be discovered by others; the need to make it evident forfeits the very virtue they aspire to." And this from Clearing the Ground (1986): "Terrorism is what we call the violence of the weak, and we condemn it; war is what we call the violence of the strong, and we glorify it."

He was also a drama critic, teacher, and lecturer, and he received numerous honorary doctorates during his career, including from Villa Maria College, Shimer College, and Lenoir Rhyne College. In 1980–1982 he was the visiting scholar at Lenoir-Rhyne College in North Carolina. For many years he was a member of the Usage Panel of the American Heritage Dictionary. He was recognized with awards from organizations including the American Civil Liberties Union, the National Conference of Christians and Jews, and the Chicago Newspaper Guild. In later years, he divided his time between Chicago and Door County, Wisconsin. Harris was married twice, and fathered five children. He died at age 69 of complications following heart bypass surgery.

== Bibliography ==
=== Collected columns ===
- Strictly Personal (1953)
- Majority of One (1957)
- Last Things First (1961)
- On the Contrary (1964)
- Leaving the Surface (1968)
- For the Time Being (1972)
- The Best of Sydney J. Harris (1975)
- Pieces of Eight (1982)
- Clearing the Ground (1986)
- How to Keep Air Clean

=== Other books ===
- The Authentic Person: Dealing with Dilemma (1972)
- Winners and Losers (1973)
- Would You Believe? (1979)
