= Potomac Associates =

- Industry: Economic and Legal Consulting
- Headquarters: Falls Church, Virginia, United States
- Website: www.adr-intl.com/potomac/p.htm

Potomac Associates is an American consortium of four independent non-partisan consulting firms engaged in research and policy consulting on substantive economic and legal issues in international trade, foreign investment, and economic development. They also work to further trade capacity building in developing countries, especially in the areas of trade policy analysis and economic modeling.

The four entities are:

- ADR International Ltd.
- James L. Kenworthy, Esq.
- Larson Global Consulting
- VORSIM.

They were on the master list of Nixon political opponents because of polling and public opinion work they did.
