= Nelson Bengston =

Nelson Bengston (August 29, 1905 – December 4, 1986) was an American businessman whose political views and actions in the civil rights movement landed him on the master list of Nixon political opponents. He was president of Bengston & Co., and a member of Business Executives Move for Vietnam Peace. He was also Treasurer of Amnesty International USA and member of the NAACP and several other progressive organizations. He worked for the Treasury selling War Bonds during World War II, and was Finance Director of Sidney Hillman's National Citizens Political Action Committee during the 1944 presidential election campaign.
