= Stanley Levey =

American journalist

Stanley Victor Levey (December 22, 1914 – March 5, 1971) was an American journalist. He covered labor and business news for the New York Times, CBS News and Scripps-Howard Newspapers. His work landed him on the master list of Nixon political opponents.

Levey was born into a Jewish family in Oneonta, New York, to Abe and Mildred (Benes) Levey, who were both born to Polish immigrant parents. His father was a clothing salesman. He earned his undergraduate and master's degrees at the University of Rochester. He died at George Washington University Hospital in Washington, D.C., several months after suffering a heart attack.
