= William J. Eaton =

American journalist

William J. Eaton (December 9, 1930 – August 23, 2005) was an American journalist.

He won the Pulitzer Prize in 1970 for his Chicago Daily News coverage of the confirmation battle over Clement Haynsworth, an unsuccessful Richard Nixon nominee for the Supreme Court of the United States. This landed him on the master list of Nixon political opponents.

In 1980, he shared the Gerald Loeb Award for Large Newspapers for his reporting on the U.S. energy crisis.

From 1984 to 1988, Eaton was chief of the Moscow bureau of the Los Angeles Times. He retired in 1994, then became curator of the Hubert H. Humphrey Fellows journalism program at the University of Maryland. He was a past president of the National Press Club.
