= John Pierson (journalist) =

American journalist (1937–2018)

John Pierson (March 17, 1937 – November 18, 2018) was an American journalist.

His work while at The Wall Street Journal earned him a place on the master list of Nixon political opponents. Pierson's articles detailed White House efforts to manipulate press coverage of Nixon.
