= Clayton Fritchey =

American journalist

Clayton Fritchey (June 30, 1904 — January 23, 2001) was an American journalist who spent many years in public service.

== Early life ==
Clayton Fritchey was born in 1904 in Bellefontaine, Ohio. At the age of 2 he moved to Baltimore.

== Career ==
His reporting career began at age 19 and by age 21 he had become the managing editor of The Baltimore Post. The New York Times in their obituary for Fritchey noted the exciting stories he wrote for the Cleveland Press, detailing the exploits of Eliot Ness, who was brought into Cleveland as its public safety director to help clean up corruption in the police department.

During his time in New Orleans as editor of the New Orleans Item, he defended an editorial that stated "Louisiana legislators 'have about as much independence as trained seals'". The Louisiana legislature convened a committee to investigate if they had been "disrespected" by Mr. Fritchey.

He was editor of the New Orleans Item when George C. Marshall asked him to become the Assistant Secretary of Public Affairs in 1950. He served as Assistant to the Secretary of Defense and Director of the Office of Public Information, Dept. of Defense, 1950–52; Assistant to the President of the United States, 1952 (President Harry Truman); and Deputy Chairman of the Democratic National Committee, 1953-57. During that time Fritchey was also the chief editor for The Democratic Digest, the monthly publication of the Democratic National Committee along with managing editor Sam Brightman and senior editor Philip M. Stern.

Fritchey served as presidential candidate Adlai Stevenson's press secretary in the 1952 and 1956. Stevenson later called upon Fritchey to serve at the United Nations as director of public affairs for the United States Mission to the United Nations. He served at that post from 1961 until Stevenson died in 1965.

In later years he was a nationally syndicated columnist. Fritchey made the master list of Nixon political opponents.

Clayton Fritchey was active in the circles of Washington's power and politics. The New York Times noted in 1981 that he introduced Jimmy Carter in 1976 to the Washington political intellectuals at his home at an event that had many in that circle attending including Sol Linowitz and Senator Gaylord Nelson. The Times also noted that Jimmy Carter did not build on these contacts.

== Personal ==
In 1975, he married Mary Ellis "Polly" (née Knowles) Wisner ( Pensacola - July 9, 2002, Georgetown), a Washington, D.C. socialite and Georgetown hostess whose first husband Frank Wisner was close friends with The Washington Post publisher Philip Graham and his wife Katharine Graham.
