= Saul Friedman =

American political journalist (1929–2010)

- Born: March 4, 1929; Brooklyn, New York
- Died: December 24, 2010 (aged 81); Edgewater, Maryland, USA
- Education: University of Houston
- Occupations: Political journalist, educator
- Spouse: Evelyn Friedman
- Children: Lise Friedman Spiegel, Leslie Kriewald

Saul Friedman (March 4, 1929 – December 24, 2010) was an American political journalist and educator. He won a Pulitzer Prize in 1968.

== Career ==
Friedman graduated from the University of Houston with a degree in philosophy in 1956. During his career, he wrote for the Houston Chronicle, the Detroit Free Press, The Atlantic, Newsday, and for Knight Ridder newspapers. He won a 1963 Nieman Fellowship. His work landed him on the master list of Nixon political opponents. He was one member of a team that covered the 1967 Detroit riot for the Detroit Free Press. Next year they shared the Pulitzer Prize in Local General or Spot News Reporting (a predecessor of the Breaking News Pulitzer), citing "both the brilliance of its detailed spot news staff work and its swift and accurate investigation into the underlying causes of the tragedy."

Friedman also taught national and foreign affairs reporting at the Columbia University Graduate School of Journalism for a year. In 1985, Friedman and his family moved to Edgewater, Maryland, where Friedman worked as a White House correspondent. Friedman began working for Newsday, although he left to spend five months in South Africa teaching journalists. After his return, Friedman wrote a weekly column called "Gray Matters" that covered issues affecting older people. After working there for more than twenty years, he quit Newsday in October 2009 over its decision to charge for its web content. He began publishing his column in November 2009 in Time Goes By, a blog.

== Death ==
Friedman died of stomach cancer on December 24, 2010.
