= John S. Knight Journalism Fellowships at Stanford =

- Formation: 1966
- Location: Palo Alto, California, United States of America
- Director: Dawn E. Garcia
- Parent organization: Stanford University
- Website: jsk.stanford.edu
- Formerly called: Professional Journalism Fellowships Program at Stanford University (1966–1984)

The John S. Knight Journalism Fellowships at Stanford is a paid 9-month journalism fellowship at Stanford University. It is one of 20 such programs available in the US for working journalists. It is connected to the School of Humanities and Sciences.

The fellowship, which is awarded to up to 20 journalists each year, is open to professional journalists with a minimum of five years of experience. Acceptance is based on the applicants' ability to "identify and articulate a challenge in journalism that they want to work on addressing." According to the program, "We expect them to arrive in the program with more questions than answers and we seek people who are eager to experiment and to change course based on what they learn along the way."

== History ==
The program began in 1966 as the Professional Journalism Fellowships Program at Stanford University. Julius Duscha was associated director from 1966 to 1968.

In 1984 it was named after the American newspaper publisher and editor John S. Knight, following a large donation from the Knight Foundation to permanently endow the fellowships.

Beginning with the 2009–10 fellowship year, the program placed a new emphasis on journalistic innovation, entrepreneurship and leadership. In 2014, it received a further $1.8 million grant from the Knight Foundation to fund a technology resource curriculum and programs to support its alumni in initiatives which they formulated during their fellowships.

== Notable alumni ==
Several of the program's alumni have received major journalism awards. Among past JSK fellows who have received the Pulitzer Prize are Daniel Golden, Eileen Welsome, and Susan Faludi.
