= Business Executives Move for Vietnam Peace =

American anti-war organization

Business Executives Move for Vietnam Peace (BEM) was an organization opposed to the Vietnam War.

In September 1967 a group of nearly one thousand businessmen formed a national committee opposing United States participation in the Vietnam War. Henry E. Niles, board chairman of Baltimore Life Insurance Company, founded the national group.

In 1971, the Chicago Business Executives Move for Vietnam Peace honored Joan Baez with an award for her anti-war work.

Their work landed them on the master list of Nixon political opponents.

Although a non-partisan group, BEM voted to endorse all candidates supporting an end to the Vietnam War. The group became inactive after the war.
