= Julius Duscha =

American journalist

- Born: November 4, 1924; United States
- Died: July 2, 2015 (aged 90)
- Education: University of Minnesota; American University
- Occupation: journalist
- Notable credit(s): St. Paul Pioneer Press and Dispatch; Congressional Quarterly; The Machinist; Washington Post
- Spouse(s): Priscilla Ann McBride (m. 1946; d. 1992) Suzanne Van Den Heurk (m. 1997)
- Children: Fred C., Steven D., Suzanne, and Sally Jean

Julius Duscha (November 4, 1924 – July 2, 2015) was an American journalist.

He attended the University of Minnesota and began his career in 1943 at the St. Paul Pioneer Press and Dispatch.

Duscha moved to Washington, D.C., in 1947 and worked for Congressional Quarterly, the Democratic National Committee, Labor's League for Political Education of the old American Federation of Labor and The Machinist, a newspaper published by the International Association of Machinists. He is a graduate of American University.

From 1954 to 1958 he wrote for the Lindsay-Schaub Newspapers of Decatur, Illinois. While working in Illinois, Duscha was awarded a Nieman Fellowship at Harvard University for the 1955–56 academic year.

From 1958 to 1966 Duscha worked for the Washington Post as an editorial writer, a reporter and a national correspondent specializing in political coverage.

Duscha was associate director of the Professional Journalism Fellowships Program at Stanford University from 1966 to 1968. He headed the Washington Journalism Center from 1968 to 1990. He also served on the board of trustees of Science Service, now known as Society for Science & the Public, from 1971 to 1985.

He wrote a syndicated column on public affairs and has contributed to New York Times Sunday Magazine, The Washingtonian, Harper's and The Atlantic. His published books include Taxpayer's Hayride: The Farm Problem; From the New Deal to the Billie Sol Estes Case, and Arms, Money and Politics.

His work landed him on the Master list of Nixon's political opponents. Duscha died on July 2, 2015, aged 90.

== Personal life ==
Duscha married Priscilla Ann McBride in 1946. (d. 1992) Their four children are Fred C., Steven D., Suzanne, and Sally Jean. He was later remarried to Suzanne Van Den Heurk in 1997.
