= George Jackson Fisher =

George Jackson Fisher (November 27, 1825 - February 3, 1893) was an American surgeon, writer, bibliophile and collector.

== Biography ==
Fisher was born in North Castle, New York. After study at the University of Buffalo, he attended the New York University Medical School, where he graduated in 1849. In 1851 he moved to what is now Ossining, New York. He was medical attendant at the state prison in Sing Sing from 1853 to 1854, United States examining physician of the Seventh Brigade of the New York State National Guard from 1853 to 1873, president of the New York State Medical Society in 1874, and a delegate to the 1876 International Medical Congress. He was the defendant in a noted suit for slander (Wm. P. Woodcock Jr., M.D. versus George Jackson Fisher, both of Sing Sing; September 1873).

He assembled a library of over 4000 volumes, taking a particular interest in anatomy and monstrosities. He brought together 500 portraits (donated to the Johns Hopkins Hospital Library) and 450 medals.

== Works ==
He succeeded Dr. Samuel D. Gross as the contributor of a "History of Surgery" to the International Encyclopædia of Surgery, and published:

- On the Animal Substances Employed as Medicines by the Ancients (1862)
- Diploteratology: an Essay on Compound Human Monsters (1866)
- Are Malformations or Monstrosities of the Foetus in Utero Ever Produced by the Power of Maternal Emotion? (1870)
- A Brief History of the Discovery of the Circulation of the Blood (1877)
- Teratology (1875)
- Sketches of Some of the Old Masters of Anatomy, Medicine, and Surgery (1880–83)
