= George E. Fisher =

American football coach and professor

Biographical details
- Born: January 17, 1869; Snyder County, Pennsylvania, U.S.
- Died: June 11, 1958 (aged 89); Dallastown, Pennsylvania, U.S.
- Education: Susquehanna (1888); Bucknell (1891); Illinois Wesleyan (1905)

Coaching career (HC unless noted)
- 1896: Susquehanna

George Elmer Fisher (January 17, 1869 – June 11, 1958) was an American college football coach and college professor. He served as the head football coach at Susquehanna University, his alma mater, in 1896. Fisher was a professor at Susquehanna for 50 years and is credited with starting the school's intercollegiate athletic program.
