= National Committee for an Effective Congress =

American political action committee (1948-)

The National Committee for an Effective Congress (NCEC) is a political action committee founded by Eleanor Roosevelt in 1948. It is one of America's most politically active independent liberal groups, pooling contributions from across the country to help elect progressive candidates to Congress. The NCEC backs candidates who support freedom of choice, separation of church and state, gun control, equal rights, and environmental protection.

It worked closely with Democrats to have congressional district lines redrawn to their advantage following the 2000 census. NCEC spokespersons have decried the lack of turnover in Congress, even as both parties' redistricting efforts have been criticized for protecting incumbents.

The NCEC provides voter-research resources to progressive political campaigns throughout the United States. The NCEC provides targeting information from the precinct to the state level. This includes party turnout, census data, racial breakdown, estimates of swing voters and voter turnout, and many other pieces of data. This is traditionally used by many campaigns for targeting volunteer and paid Canvass efforts, as well as mail and phone programs.

== Services ==
The NCEC defines its services as the following:

1. Electoral precinct targeting
2. Demographic precinct targeting
3. Voter profile analysis
4. Get-out-the-vote plans
5. Candidate scheduling plans
6. Media market analyses
7. Polling sample selections
8. Vote goal analyses

== See also ==
- Russell D. Hemenway, the NCEC's national director from 1966 to 2014
