= James Millstone =

American journalist

James C. Millstone (January 16, 1930 – June 25, 1992) was an American journalist and editor.

== Career ==
Millstone was an editor and former Washington correspondent of The St. Louis Post-Dispatch. He started working for The Post-Dispatch in 1956. In the 60s, he began covering Washington. In 1971, he returned to St. Louis and worked as an editor, eventually working his way up to becoming a senior assistant managing editor.

== Family ==
Millstone was married to his wife Pat W. Millstone and together they had a daughter named Sacha and three sons named Jason, Colin, and Jeremy. He was the son of Hilda Millstone. He also had two grandchildren.

== Death ==
Millstone died on June 25, 1992, at his home in University City, Missouri, at the age of 62. The cause of his death was from brain cancer.

== Awards and honors ==
As an assistant managing editor of the St. Louis Post-Dispatch, his work landed him on the master list of Nixon political opponents.

== Court case ==
He sued Fireman's Fund Insurance Company, who refused him auto insurance after an elderly neighbor reported him to police in retaliation for having Vietnam War protestors as guests. Because the investigating agency made no attempt to double-check, Millstone won a landmark court judgment of $40,000 from the firm.

== Sources ==
- Staff report (July 18, 1977). Striking Back At the Super Snoops. Time magazine
- Mention of James Millstone's death
