= Robert Buzzanco =

American historian

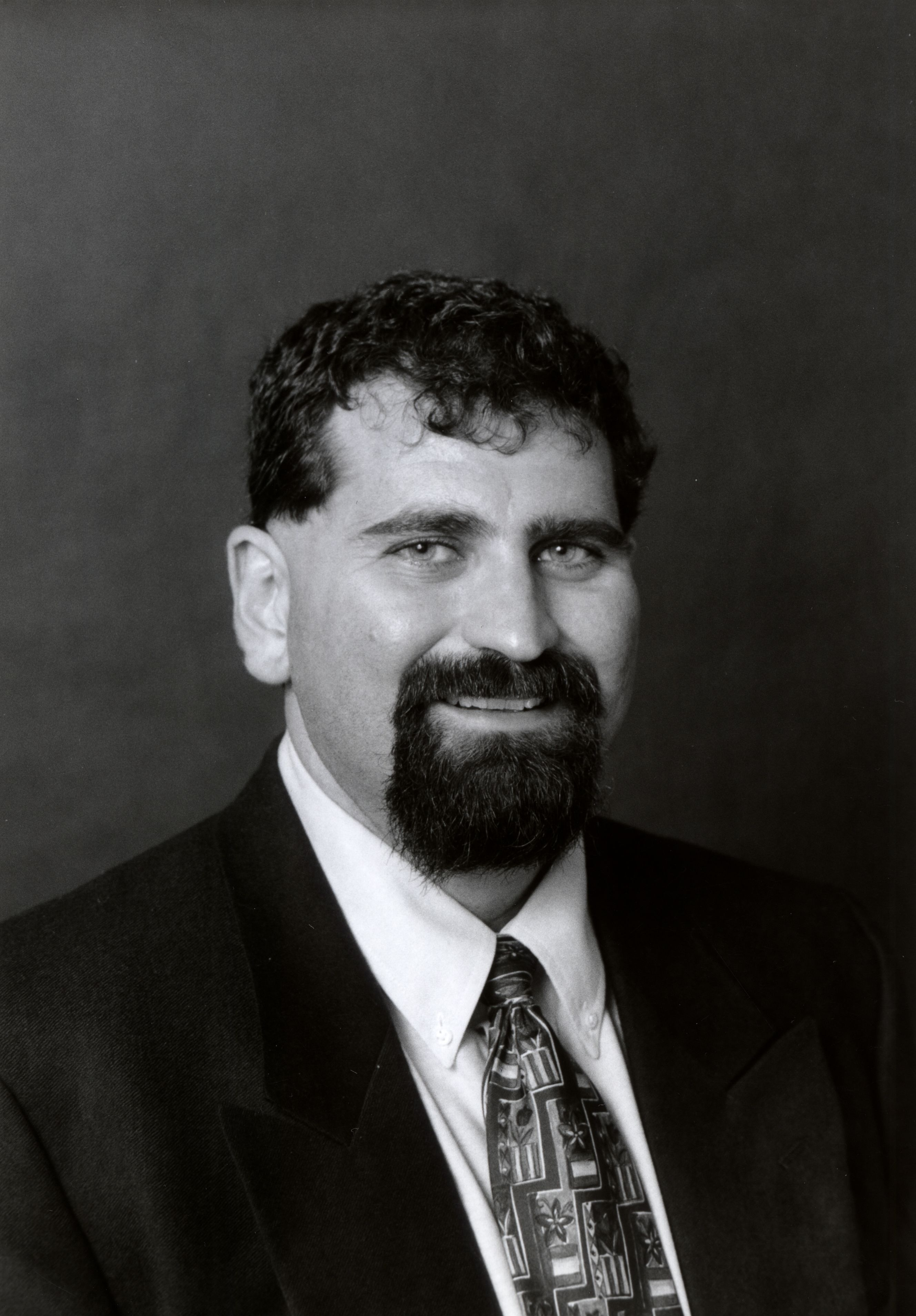
Robert Buzzanco

Robert Buzzanco is a scholar of 20th century U.S. history and diplomatic history. He is also an author focusing on the Vietnam War and aligns with the "orthodox" historiographical school. Buzzanco received his Ph.D. from The Ohio State University and currently teaches at the University of Houston. Buzzanco has lectured at national conferences on the Second Gulf War, globalization and the influence of the industrial military complex. Among his many other professional activities, he has served as the Chair of the Stuart L. Bernath Lecture Prize Committee for Society of Historians of American Foreign Relations. Buzzanco has also contributed to national newspapers and magazines such as the Baltimore Sun, Houston Chronicle and Newsday magazine. He has been interviewed or cited by various international media such as the BBC, NPR, the Financial Times, Al-Jazeerra and the Islamic News Network.

== Education ==
- The Ohio State University. Ph.D. in history, 1993; M.A. in history, 1984.
- Ohio Wesleyan University. B.A. in History and Philosophy, 1982.

== Teaching ==
Buzzanco teaches a variety of courses in U.S. history, including, at the undergraduate level, both halves of the survey, the history of the Vietnam War, America in the 1960s, and U.S. foreign policy, as well as a new course in 2004 titled "War, Globalization and Terror". He has also taught graduate courses on the Vietnam War, post-1945 U.S. history, and U.S. foreign relations ("Empire, War, and Diplomacy"), as well as numerous research seminars. Buzzanco has been the advisor on many dissertation thesis committees. He currently teaches at the University of Houston, in Houston, Texas.

== Research ==
Buzzanco is the author or editor of three books, and he has written more than twenty articles that have appeared in scholarly publications and major newspapers. His current works include a manuscript on culture and politics for Oxford's VSI series, as well as his continuing work on the political economy of the 1960s and the impact of the Vietnam War on the U.S. economy.

== Selected publications ==
- Buzzanco, Robert (1996). Masters of War: Military Dissent and Politics in the Vietnam Era. Cambridge University Press. ISBN 978-0521599405. Recipient of Stuart L. Bernath Prize, awarded by Society of Historians of American Foreign Relations. Chapter on Tet Offensive excerpted in Robert McMahon, ed, Major Problems in the History of the Vietnam War, 3d edition.
- Young, Marilyn B.; Buzzanco, Robert, eds. (2006). A Companion to the Vietnam War. Wiley-Blackwell. p. 528. ISBN 978-1405149839.. A collection of essays on Vietnam in the "Blackwell Companion Series.”
- "The Politics of Escalation in Vietnam during the Johnson Years", in Young, Marilyn B.; Buzzanco, Robert, eds. (2006). A Companion to the Vietnam War. Wiley-Blackwell. p. 528. ISBN 978-1405149839.
- Buzzanco, Robert (1999). Vietnam and the Transformation of American Life. Blackwell Publishers. p. 276. ISBN 978-1577180944.
- "Anti-Imperialism" in Encyclopedia of American Foreign Relations, 2002
- "How Did Iraq and the United States Become Enemies", History News Network, 28 October 2002.
- "The United States and Vietnam, 1950-1968: Capitalism, Communism, and Containment", in Empire and Revolution: The United States and the Third World since 1945, edited by Peter L. Hahn and Mary Ann Heiss, pp. 94–120 (The Ohio State University Press 2001). (Excerpted in Dennis Merrill and Thomas Paterson, eds. Major Problems in American Foreign Relations, volume II, 6th edition).
