= The Fund for Constitutional Government =

- Formation: 1974
- Headquarters: Washington, D.C., U.S.
- President: Anne Zill
- Website: www.fcgonline.org

The Fund for Constitutional Government (FCG) is an American, non-profit organization dedicated to promoting democracy, government, and corporate transparency, fair economies, and efforts against corruption and climate change. The fund is based at Capitol Hill and works to bring to light instances of corruption with large public impact.

Founded in 1974, its stated mission is to "awaken the American public's concern about the Constitution and to stimulate interest in monitoring how government conducts its business." The organization was founded by Stewart Rawlings Mott, an heir to the General Motors fortune. It is a fiscal sponsor of Transparency International in the United States.
