= Nathaniel Goldfinger =

Nathaniel Goldfinger was born on August 20, 1916 in the Bronx, New York City, and continued his New York residency throughout the majority of his early adult life. He graduated from City College of New York in 1938, earning a Bachelor's degree in Social Science. The Bronx native would then spend his graduate study at New York University and The New School for Social Research. He went on to devote his adult life working with labor organizations and even serve as the director of National Bureau of Economic Research. Goldfinger was also appointed the presidency of the Industrial Relations Research Association, and attained membership at the executive committee of the Joint Council on Economic Education. However, his most notable position was his directorship of the AFL–CIO Department of Research(1963), where he served for thirteen years before his death in 1976. His work even famously landed him on the master list of Nixon political opponents, a bipartisan index uncovered during the Watergate hearings of 1973.

As for his personal life, Goldfinger was married to Betty Gordes, who died in 2014. They had two daughters together, Judith and Ruth. Nathaniel Goldfinger died on Thursday, July 22, 1976, following a persistent illness. He was 59 years old.

== Political Influence ==
Nathaniel Goldfinger was a liberal democrat, who focused mainly on both labor union organizations, and educating the American people on basic research and economic processes/practices. Goldfinger found himself vocally opposed to the liberal economists of the 1960s, believing there were unfair and uneducated criticisms against unions. Goldfinger believed unions to be the heart of a nation, balancing economic power against big corporations and playing an essential role in public policy. Goldfinger believed that the liberal economists of the Kennedy/Johnson Administration had grown idle when dealing with conversations surrounding labor unions, specifically their handling of the minimum wage. He would emphasize the country’s ignorant pushback at union organizations’ pursuit for a higher minimum wage, attempting to shut down the myth during the time that higher minimum wages led to higher consumer prices. Goldfinger was also extremely opposed to Right-to-work law’s, viewing them as an anti-union policy aimed at diminishing union power. He believed these laws to be misleading and deceitful, providing no guarantee of employment and rather prohibiting union security agreements. In his journal article published in 1958, “The controversy over trade union membership in the United States”, Goldfinger emphasizes that employers typically accept union security to avoid poor labor relations, even citing that in government-run elections (1947-1951), 91% of workers voted in favor of union security. Goldfinger continued his career defending union organizations and their rights to strike, negotiate and protest. The latter part of his career was met with a strenuous relationship with the labor movement, not only due for his defense of labor unions, but also his outspoken criticism against multinational corporations and protectionism; making him a divisive figure amongst fellow liberal economists– such as George Meany, who was the Nation’s most powerful voice for civil and labor rights in the 1960s. Goldfinger viewed the existence of multinational corporations and the act of foreign sourcing less as an economic disadvantage, and more as a misuse of distribution– allocating benefits to company profits instead of lower consumer prices.

== Stance on Economics ==
Nathaniel Goldfinger would deem most of America’s hardships as a result of a lack of economic education, believing that basic economics should be taught to the masses. He felt that the population's thirst for misinformation and reliance on myths were undeniably holding the country back. And though he was critical of the liberal administrations at the time, Goldfinger did find common ground with former president John F. Kennedy’s forward thinking ideas. Particularly, mentioning his Yale address of 1962 in his 1965-published article titled, “Economic Education for the Second Half of the Twentieth Century”. Kennedy’s address saw the former president plead to the American people to move on with the past, challenging the youth to “move on from the reassuring repetition of stale phrases”(Kennedy), and to be a generation unafraid to confront the harsh realities of a nation.

== Impact ==
His legacy lives on, mainly through his former foundation, The Goldfinger Memorial Fund for Labor Research at the George Meany Center for Labor Studies. The fund, along with Goldfinger’s records, were transferred to the University of Maryland’s research department in 2013. Immediately following his death in 1976, Goldfinger’s family requested that contributions should go to the financing of the former fund, highlighting a focus to maintain the values of Goldfinger (such as education and research), even after his death.
