= George R. Fischer =

American underwater archaeologist

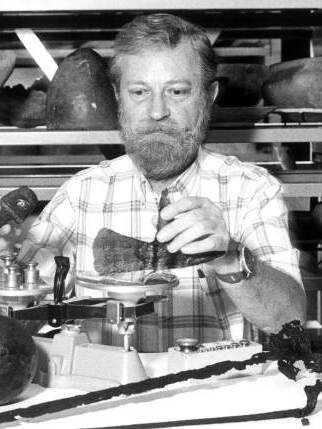
Fischer in 1985

George Robert Fischer (May 4, 1937 – May 29, 2016) was an American underwater archaeologist, considered the founding father of the field in the National Park Service. A native Californian, he did undergraduate and graduate work at Stanford University, and began his career with the National Park Service in 1959, which included assignments in six parks, the Washington, D.C. Office, and the Southeast Archaeological Center from which he retired in 1988. He began teaching courses in underwater archaeology at Florida State University in 1974 and co-instructed inter-disciplinary courses in scientific diving techniques. After retirement from the NPS his FSU activities were expanded and his assistance helped shape the university's program in underwater archaeology.

Fischer was a true pioneer in the field of underwater archaeology and his students are now professors in the U.S. and abroad, serve as state, federal, and territorial archaeologists, direct non-profit research organizations, and work in the private sector. He founded and oversaw the underwater archaeology program for the National Park Service in 1968, and was involved with many of the early shipwreck excavations that are now required reading in introductory textbooks (such as the 1554 Padre Island galleons, 1733 galleon San Jose, 1622 galleon Rosario, 1748 British warship HMS Fowey, 1865 steamboat Bertrand). Fischer taught, as a volunteer at no cost to the university, for almost 30 years at Florida State University, which enabled their underwater archaeology program and introduced hundreds of students to this field.

== Personal life ==
Fischer was born in Susanville, Lassen County, to George August Fischer, a forester with the United States Forest Service, and Ruth Robertson Fischer, a school teacher. He was raised in various small towns in northern California, including Alturus, Quincy and Tulelake. While in Tulelake, his mother taught school children at the Tule Lake War Relocation Center, and found it more convenient to bring young George along and teach him with the interned Japanese children. Fischer soon distinguished himself as the only Caucasian child that was hurling stones at the guards during recess.

He met his wife, Nancy (Jane) George Fischer while attending Stanford and they were married on June 20, 1961. They had a son while Fischer was stationed at Montezuma Castle National Monument in Arizona. They lived in Tallahassee, Florida during his career with the Southeast Archeological Center and Florida State University and after his retirement.

He died in Tallahassee, Florida, on May 29, 2016.

== Education ==
Fischer attended Stanford University, performing his Undergraduate work from 1955 to 1960 and earning his Bachelor of Arts in Anthropology, with minor concentrations in English and Geology. He continued with graduate school at Stanford from 1960–62 and has completed all requirements for his Master of Arts in Anthropology except thesis. Fischer dabbled part-time as a special student at Florida State University from 1972 to 1973 while employed at the Southeast Archaeological Center.

== Employment ==
George Fischer was employed with the National Park Service from 1959 to 1988, starting as a seasonal Park Ranger and archaeologist from 1959 to 1962 in Mesa Verde National Park and Wupatki National Monument. In 1962 he became a full-time employee with the NPS as Park Archaeologist at Montezuma Castle National Monument, and in 1964 he took a position as the Park Archaeologist at Ocmulgee National Monument. In 1966 Fischer moved on to become a Staff Archaeologist at the Division of Archaeology and Anthropology for the NPS in Washington, D.C. There Fischer performed general archaeological resource management and research and was able to pursue interests in underwater archaeology.

1972 saw Fischer transferring to Tallahassee to take a position as a Research Archaeologist at the Southeast Archaeological Center, and that institution's close association with the Florida State University Department of Anthropology led to Fischer's work with archaeology faculty and students there. Upon his retirement from the NPS in 1988, Fischer became a Courtesy Assistant Professor for the Department of Anthropology. During his tenure at Florida State, he served as an instructor of underwater archaeology courses, lectured on topics relating to underwater archaeology for courses in historical archaeology, public archaeology, and Southeast colonial history, and assisted or co-instructed courses in scientific diving techniques and project management through the Academic Diving Program. Fischer's instruction and mentoring capacities lessened in the late 1990s as he shifted more into retirement mode.

== Archaeological achievements ==
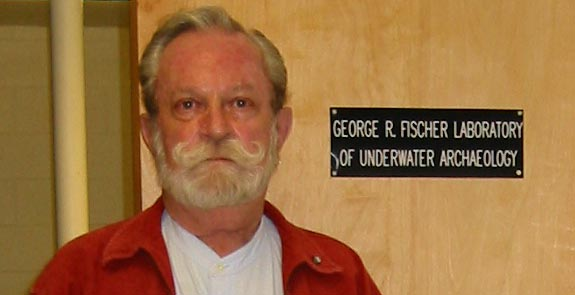
George R. Fischer at his namesake laboratory at Florida State University

George Fischer served as principal investigator on field projects undertaken through his Park Service and FSU career in two areas of Gulf Islands National Seashore; Castillo de San Marcos, Fort Jefferson, and Fort Matanzas National Monuments in Florida; and Fort Frederica National Monument in Georgia. Projects in Florida outside the National Park System included investigations at Fort Picolata, St. John's County; a survey for HMS Fox (1799) at St. George Island; a survey of Ballast Cove, Dog Island; an underwater survey of Wakulla Springs; a project involving applications of underwater archaeological techniques to crime scene investigation for the Florida Department of Law Enforcement; and several investigations of shipwreck sites in Mobile Bay. He also taught portions of workshops that the Academic Diving Program has sponsored for outside agencies.

=== Montezuma Well ===
In the earliest underwater archaeological investigations by the Park Service (October, 1968), Fischer directed a survey and testing of Montezuma Well, Montezuma Castle National Monument, Arizona.

=== Steamboat Bertrand ===
From July to September, 1969, Fischer served as field coordinator on the excavation of the 19th century steamboat Bertrand at Desoto National Wildlife Refuge on the Missouri River near Blair, Nebraska. Over 200,000 items were excavated from the wreck, whole objects in incredible condition, still packed in the original crates, with the names of the manufacturers, shippers and consignees; all dated to the morning of April 1, 1865. This opened his eyes to the "time capsule" nature of historic shipwreck sites, allowing one to see a specific day and an event caught in time, rather than working with fragments of artifacts and historical trash.

=== Padre Island National Seashore ===
In 1970 George Fischer headed up what came to be one of the first serious underwater archaeology investigations by National Park Service starting with a terrestrial metal detector survey and preliminary assessment of underwater archaeological resources at Padre Island National Seashore in Texas. Preliminary research led to an underwater archaeological survey of 1554 Spanish Plate Fleet wrecks there, and excavation of the Galleon San Esteban, sponsored by Texas Antiquities Committee.

=== Fort Jefferson ===
Fort Jefferson is a US Third System Fort 70 miles west of Key West in the Gulf of Mexico, and is the largest brick masonry fortification in the western hemisphere. In the late 1960s and early 1970s Fischer led evaluations of underwater archaeological resources, limited underwater archaeological survey and excavations, and extensive underwater archaeological survey and testing activities. The 1969 work marked the first extensive shipwreck survey by the NPS on park property, noting more than 20 sites. He also participated with staff of Earth Satellite Corporation in a remote sensing survey for historic shipwreck sites, and assisted in analysis of data. Work was conducted at Fort Jefferson in 1981 and 1982 in partnership with Florida State University.

=== 1622 galleon Rosario ===
In the summer of 1981 and 1982 Fischer directed underwater archaeological investigations of what is considered the wreck of the Nuestra Señora del Rosario of the 1622 Spanish fleet, as well as an unidentified patache of the same fleet. This investigation revealed what could represent one of the pataches that was sent to salvage the Rosario less than a month after the hurricane that sank it, possibly documenting the speed with which the Spanish salvaged their own wrecks.

=== HMS Fowey ===
HMS Fowey was a fifth rate British warship, carrying 44 guns and over 200 men, captained by a descendant of Sir Francis Drake's brother. It had scored victories over French and Spanish ships in battle, but was lost on a reef at what is now known as the Legare Anchorage in Biscayne National Park in 1748. The sunken vessel became the subject of an ownership dispute with a part-time treasure salvor who presumed that it was part of the Spanish treasure fleet. Through legal conflicts and systematic surveys and archaeological investigations of the 1980s and 1990s, Fischer and his staff from the Park Service and students from Florida State University not only identified the sunken vessel but won a legal battle that effectively changed how Admiralty law was applied to submerged shipwreck sites. The court found that the National Historic Preservation Act of 1966 was to be applied to submerged shipwreck sites as it is to historic sites on land, no longer allowing plundering by individuals using marine salvage and Admiralty law to profiteer from the non-archaeological salvage of a historic shipwreck in National Park grounds. This activity is seen by many of his colleagues and former students as George Fischer's defining act.

=== Advisory Council on Underwater Archaeology ===
Fischer was also a founding member of the Advisory Council on Underwater Archaeology, an international committee of the Society for Historical Archaeology that provides advice and assistance to governments, institutions, and individuals on matters relating to the field. He currently holds emeritus status.

=== FSU ADP ===
During the period of Fischer's tenure as a courtesy professor the FSU Coastal and Marine Laboratory's Academic Diving Program, established in 1975, grew to one of the largest and most active diving research, support, and training programs in the United States. The Marine Lab and Academic Diving Program traditionally supports the research diving needs of faculty and students from many departments, as well as several outside agencies, including the Florida Geological Survey and the US Environmental Protection Agency. Fischer assisted or co-instructed courses in scientific diving techniques and project management through the Florida State University Academic Diving Program from 1976 through his retirement from the Park Service in 1988, and continued as a co-instructor until 2002. His input and continuity over three decades was instrumental in the expansion and ongoing development of this program.

=== Publications ===
- George Fischer, with primary author and former student Russell K. Skowronek, authored the book HMS Fowey Lost and Found: Being the Discovery, Excavation, and Identification of a British Man-of-War Lost off the Cape of Florida in 1748, published by the University Press of Florida on January 26, 2009.
- Fischer, George R. (1975) A Survey of the Offshore Lands of Gulf Islands National Seashore, Florida. International Journal of Nautical Archaeology 3(2):338-339.
- Fischer, George R. (1975) "Archeological Assessment of Biscayne National Monument." Southeast Archeological Center, National Park Service, Tallahassee, Florida.
- Fischer, George R. (1980) "Interim Report: Underwater Archeological Survey of Legare Anchorage, Biscayne National Park." Southeast Archeological Center, National Park Service, Tallahassee, Florida.
- Fischer, George R. and Richard E. Johnson (1982) "Fort Jefferson National Monument Overview, Research Design, and Scope of Work, Investigations of Site FOJE-UW-9 (8MO83)." Southeast Archeological Center, National Park Service, Tallahassee, Florida.
- Skowronek, Russell K., Richard E. Johnson, Richard H. Vernon and George R. Fischer (1987) "The Legare Anchorage Shipwreck Site-Grave of HMS Fowey". International Journal of Nautical Archaeology 16(4):313-324.
- Fischer, George R. and Philip R. Gerrell (1990) An Underwater Archaeological Assessment of Cultural Resources Located at the Edward Ball Wakulla Springs State Park (8WA24), Florida. In Underwater Archaeology Proceedings from the Society for Historical Archaeology Conference, edited by Toni Carrell, pp. 125–128. Society for Historical Archaeology, Tucson, Arizona.
- McLean, Cecil W. and George R. Fischer (1991) Investigation of the Civil War Blockade Runner Ivanhoe. Florida State University Department of Anthropology.
- Fischer, George R. (1993) The Conference on Underwater Archaeology and The Advisory Council on Underwater Archaeology: A Brief History. In Underwater Archaeology Proceedings from the Society for Historical Archaeology Conference, edited by Shelli O. Smith, pp. 2–6. Society for Historical Archaeology, Kansas City, Missouri.
- Fischer, George R. (1999) The History of Underwater Archaeology at Florida State University: a Retrospective of the Past and a Look to the Future. In Underwater Archaeology Proceedings from the Society for Historical Archaeology Conference, edited by Adrian A. Neidinger and Matthew A. Russell, pp. 80–84. Society for Historical Archaeology, Salt Lake City, Utah.

== Awards and honors ==
- The Department of Anthropology at Florida State University dedicated its George R. Fischer Laboratory of Underwater Archaeology to Fischer (see photograph at top of page).
- LAMP and the St. Augustine Lighthouse awarded Fischer a Lifetime Achievement award, for his "many contributions to the field of underwater archaeology, and to the education of this and future generations of underwater archaeologists" on March 21, 2007.
- In March 2007, LAMP announced during the first annual Northeast Florida Symposium on Underwater Archaeology that Fischer had donated his personal library to LAMP, to form the core of a first-class research library, the George R. Fischer Library of Maritime Archaeology.
- A session of papers in honor of Fischer was presented at the 41st annual Conference on Historical and Underwater Archaeology held in Albuquerque, New Mexico on January 10, 2008.
- On January 8, 2010, at the 43rd annual Conference on Historical and Underwater Archaeology at Amelia Island in Northeast Florida, Fischer was presented with the Society for Historical Archaeology's Award of Merit "for his many contributions to the development of underwater archaeology and for his exemplary service on the Advisory Council on Underwater Archaeology."
