= George Drennen Fischer =

American activist (1925–2021)

George Drennan Fischer (November 29, 1925 – October 11, 2021) was an American activist and spokesman for the National Education Association.

In 1968, he signed the "Writers and Editors War Tax Protest" pledge, vowing to refuse tax payments in protest against the Vietnam War.

He presented the Statement on Comprehensive Preschool Education and Child Day Care Act of 1969 before the Select Subcommittee on Education, February 27, 1970.

He also published on the state of Native American education with Walter Mondale.

His actions got him placed on the master list of Nixon political opponents.
