= Strain =

Strain may refer to:

== Science and technology ==
- Strain (biology), variants of biological organisms
- Strain (chemistry), a chemical stress of a molecule
- Strain (general relativity), measure of spacetime stretching in linearized gravity
- Strain (injury), an injury to a muscle
- Strain (mechanics), a measure of deformation
- Filtration, separating fluids from solids by passing through a filter
- Percolation, of fluids through porous materials
- Psychological stress

== Other uses ==
- straining, in cooking, by a strainer or sieve.
- Strain, a term in contract bridge

== Proper names ==
- Strain (surname)

=== Arts and media ===
- Strain (manga), 1996
- Strain (music), phrases of a piece
- Strain (album), 2004, by Flesh Field
- Strain: Strategic Armored Infantry, a 2006 anime
- Strain (film), a 2020 Nigerian drama

=== Places ===
- Strain, Arkansas, US, an unincorporated community
- Strain, Missouri, US, an unincorporated community

== See also ==
- Overwork
- S Train (disambiguation)
- Strain theory (disambiguation)
- Strainer
- The Strain (disambiguation)
- Stressor
