= John Strain =

John Strain may refer to:

- John Strain (bishop), Roman Catholic clergyman
- John Strain (mathematician), professor of mathematics
- John Paul Strain, American artist
