= Thomas O'Shea =

Thomas O'Shea may refer to:

- Thomas E. O'Shea (1895–1918), United States Army corporal and Medal of Honor recipient
- Thomas O'Shea (bishop) (1870–1954), Roman Catholic Archbishop of Wellington
- Thomas H. O'Shea (1898–1962), Irish revolutionary
