= Matthew Guinan =

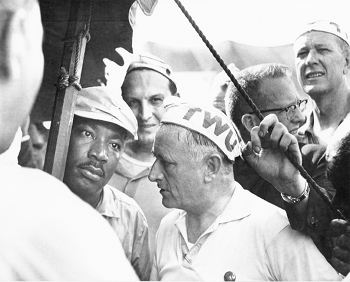
TWU Executive Vice-president Matthew Guinan conferring with Martin Luther King Jr. on the march from Selma to Montgomery

Matthew "Ted" Guinan (October 14, 1910 – March 22, 1995) was an Irish labor organizer and a founding member of Transport Workers Union of America (TWU). He held many high ranking positions in the union including International President.

Born in County Offaly, Ireland, he immigrated in 1929. He took a job as a trolley operator in 1933. In 1943, after six years as an unpaid volunteer organizer, he became a full-time organizer for TWU Local 100. Guinan was elected as International Executive Vice President in 1952. Then International Secretary Treasurer in 1956, he was re-elected in 1961 and 1965.

He was heavily involved in negotiating the 40-hour work week for public bus workers in 1951. The same rights were won for private bus owners in 1953 after a 29-day strike. Following a bitter New York City transit strike in 1966 Guinan and other leaders spent nine days in jail after refusing to call it off.

President Mike Quill died at age 60, and Guinan succeeded his longtime friend. Guinan held the post of International President until his retirement on May 1, 1979.

== Political activism ==
Guinan walked with Martin Luther King Jr. in the 1965 Selma to Montgomery marches in Alabama, and he committed the union's resources of money and manpower to the cause for equality.

As an AFL-CIO Vice President, he served on their Civil Rights Committee. His activism landed him on the master list of Nixon political opponents.

Cardinal John Joseph O'Connor presided over Guinan's 1995 funeral at St. Patrick's Cathedral, New York.

Trade union offices
Preceded by Michael J. Quill	President of the Transport Workers Union of America; 1966–1979	Succeeded by William G. Lindner
