= 42nd Street Shuttle =

New York City Subway shuttle service

- 42nd Street Shuttle

- 42nd Street Shuttle train of R62A cars entering Grand Central.

- Northern end: Times Square
- Southern end: Grand Central
- Stations: 2
- Rolling stock: R62A (Rolling stock assignments subject to change)
- Depot: Livonia Yard
- Started service: August 1, 1918; 108 years ago

IRT 42nd Street Line

Overview
- Status: Open
- Owner: City of New York
- Locale: Midtown Manhattan
- Termini: Times Square; Grand Central
- Stations: 2

Service
- Type: Rapid transit
- System: New York City Subway
- Operator: New York City Transit Authority
- Rolling stock: R62A
- Daily ridership: 100,000

History
- Opened: October 27, 1904; 122 years ago

Technical
- Line length: 0.44 miles (0.71 km)
- Num of tracks: 2 (formerly 4)
- Character: Underground
- Track gauge: 4 ft 8 1/2 in (1,435 mm) standard gauge
- Electrification: Third rail, 625 V DC

The 42nd Street Shuttle is a New York City Subway shuttle train service that operates in Manhattan. The shuttle is sometimes referred to as the Grand Central/Times Square Shuttle, since these are the only two stations it serves. The shuttle operates at all times except late nights, with trains running on two tracks underneath 42nd Street between Times Square and Grand Central; for many decades, three tracks had been in service until a major renovation was begun in 2019 reducing it to two tracks. With two stations, it is the shortest regular service in the system by number of stops, running about 2,402 feet (732 m) in 90 seconds as of 2005. The shuttle is used by over 100,000 passengers every day, and by up to 10,200 passengers per hour during rush hours.

The 42nd Street Shuttle was constructed and operated by the Interborough Rapid Transit Company (IRT) and is part of the A Division of New York City Transit as of 2024. The shuttle tracks opened in 1904 as part of the city's first subway. The original subway line ran north from City Hall on what is now the IRT Lexington Avenue Line to 42nd Street, from where it turned west to run across 42nd Street. At Broadway, the line turned north, proceeding to 145th Street on what is now the IRT Broadway–Seventh Avenue Line. This operation continued until 1918, when construction on the Lexington Avenue Line north of 42nd Street, and on the Broadway–Seventh Avenue Line south of 42nd Street was completed. One trunk would run via the new Lexington Avenue Line down Park Avenue, and the other trunk would run via the new Seventh Avenue Line up Broadway. The section in the middle, via 42nd Street, was converted into shuttle operation.

Through the 20th century, various attempts to convert, replace, or extend the shuttle have failed. The proposals have included conveyor-belt systems, as well as reconstruction of connections to the Broadway–Seventh Avenue and Lexington Avenue lines. One of the shuttle's trains was outfitted with automatic train operation on a trial basis in 1962, although the trial ended after a fire in 1964. A major reconstruction of the shuttle took place between 2019 and 2022. The reconstruction allowed trains to be lengthened to six cars while also expanding both shuttle stations' capacity, and brought the shuttle into compliance with the Americans with Disabilities Act of 1990.

The shuttle does not operate overnight, and each of the shuttle tracks in operation at any given time is independent of the other. Its route bullet is colored dark gray on route signs, station signs, and rolling stock with the letter "S" on the official subway map.

== History ==
=== Creation and early years ===
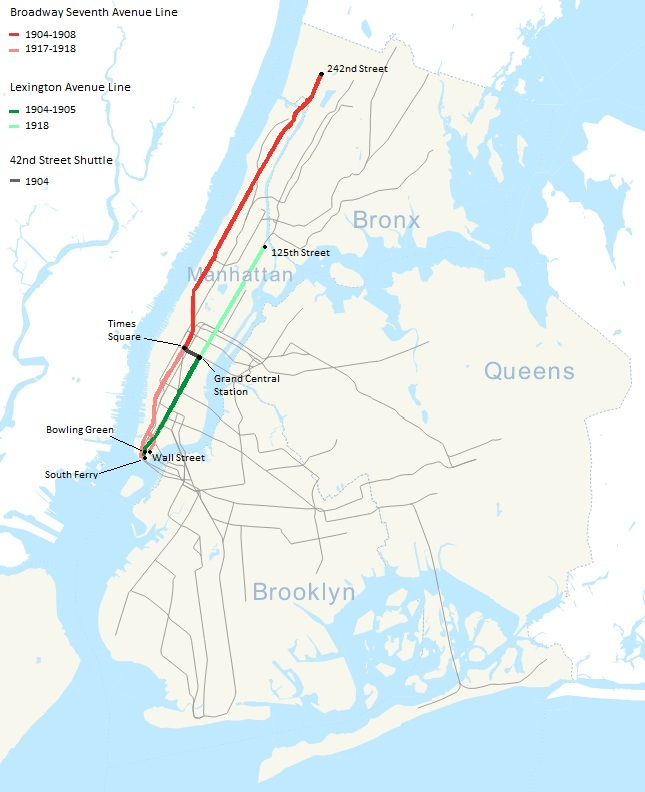
A view of the H system

The subway through which the shuttle runs was opened on October 27, 1904, by the Interborough Rapid Transit Company (IRT), the first day of subway service in Manhattan. The current shuttle line was part of the first IRT subway line, which ran north to 145th Street via Broadway and south to City Hall via Park Avenue and Lafayette Street. The 42nd Street section of the line connected Broadway at Times Square, on the west, to Park Avenue at Grand Central Terminal, on the east. At the Times Square end of this segment, the line curved sharply to the north under One Times Square, swinging northeast under Seventh Avenue before shifting under Broadway. The platforms at Times Square are located on this curve. Like the rest of the Original Subway, the line was built with a vertical clearance of 13 feet (4.0 m), and a total width of 49 feet (15 m). The maximum grade of the line is 1.0 percent between Sixth Avenue and Broadway. In 1910, the platforms at the two stations were extended.

In 1913, the IRT, the Brooklyn Rapid Transit, and the city agreed to the Dual System of Rapid Transit to expand the city's transportation. As part of the agreement, the existing IRT subway would be split into two north–south lines and a shuttle along 42nd Street. The section of the line south of Grand Central–42nd Street would be connected to a newly constructed line stretching from 41st Street and Park Avenue to the Bronx, running via Lexington Avenue, while the section of the line north of Times Square–42nd Street would be connected to a newly constructed line heading south under Seventh Avenue. The section along 42nd Street was left as a shuttle to connect the new East Side and West Side Lines.

The new Lexington Avenue route curved off of the old line at 41st Street and ran underneath private property to reach Lexington Avenue at 43rd Street with a new Grand Central station located in the diagonal segment. Since there was 400 feet between the eastern end of the original line's station and the new Lexington Avenue Line station, a new shuttle station was to be built near the Lexington Avenue Line station. The construction of the narrow island platform station required building two new trackways extending east under 42nd Street. The two-track layout was expected to provide ample capacity for the shuttle. On August 1, 1918, the Dual System's "H system" was put into service, with through trains over the IRT Lexington Avenue Line and IRT Broadway–Seventh Avenue Line, and only shuttle trains under 42nd Street. The station was not ready in time, and therefore wooden flooring was temporarily laid over sections of the trackways at Times Square and Grand Central. The shuttle was heavily used, and the crowding conditions were so bad that the shuttle was ordered closed the next day by the Public Service Commission.

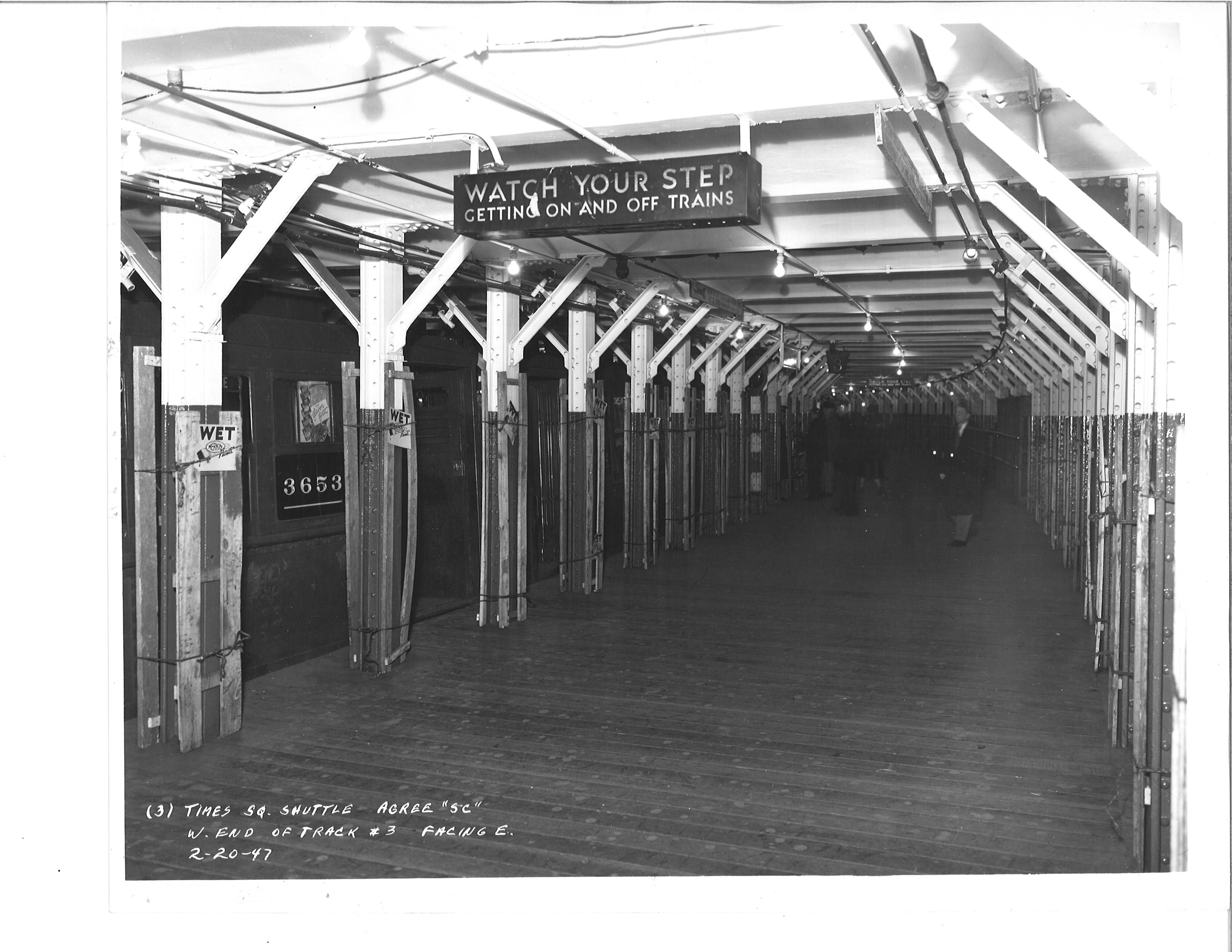
View of the wooden platform at Times Square over track 2 in 1947

The new, unused trackways of the planned station were covered with flooring and turned into a passageway between the Shuttle and Lexington Avenue stations. The shuttle reopened on September 28, 1918, with improved passageways and platforms. Track 2 at the Grand Central station was covered over by a wooden platform. A New York Times columnist later said that former southbound express track 2 was still usable for the first few hours of the shuttle's operation, but the wooden platform was placed over that track later the same day to allow shuttles to use former northbound express track 3, due to high demand for the shuttles on the former local tracks, numbered 1 and 4. On the walls of the stations, black bands (at Times Square) and green bands (at Grand Central) were painted to guide passengers to the shuttle platforms. The shuttle was meant to be "temporary," and by 1922, there were proposals for the shuttle to be replaced by a moving sidewalk.

On March 14, 1927, the extension of the IRT Flushing Line from Fifth Avenue to Times Square under 41st Street was completed and opened for operation. The extension was expected to significantly reduce overcrowding on the shuttle, and on its first night of operation, it reduced shuttle ridership by 50%. Crowding was expected to be reduced further as riders became familiar with the extension. In 1921, of the 100,000 daily shuttle riders, 25,000 transferred to the Flushing Line (then called the Queensboro subway). Originally, plans for the Flushing Line called for the use of two of the four tracks between Times Square and Grand Central for the new line, and the other two for shuttle service.

=== Proposed improvements ===
Throughout the history of the shuttle there have been proposals to improve service on the line and to extend the line both to the east and to the west. However, it is not feasible to extend the line in either direction, as the line is at the same level as the tracks of the Broadway–Seventh Avenue Line and those of the Lexington Avenue Line. There have been several proposals to replace the line with moving walkways or conveyor belts. In 1923, H.S. Putnam proposed to replace the shuttle with an endless moving platform system. There would have been three platforms with speeds of 3 miles per hour (4.8 km/h), 6 miles per hour (9.7 km/h) and 9 miles per hour (14 km/h). The fastest platform was to have been installed with seats. Even though the plan was supported by the Chief Engineer of the New York City Rapid Transit Commission, it was not adopted. In 1930, Charles E. Smith, vice president of the New York, New Haven and Hartford Railroad, proposed allowing trains from the Broadway–Seventh Avenue and Lexington Avenue Lines to use the shuttle tracks for through service, as well as discontinuing shuttle service. This also was not carried out.

On February 12, 1946, work began to double the width of the passageway connecting the shuttle platforms at Grand Central and the main mezzanine over the Lexington Avenue Line platforms. As part of the work, the wooden passenger walkway, which had an average width of 15 feet (4.6 m) was replaced by a 37 feet (11 m) wide passageway with concrete flooring. This walkway had been "temporary" when it was put into place in August 1918. The new 350 feet (110 m)-long passageway covered most of the trackways used by downtown trains of the Original Subway prior to 1918. The iron railings along the planked walkway were removed. The project cost $45,800 and was intended to ease congestion. As part of the project, the upper passageway was moved to within fare control to allow passengers to go between the subway mezzanine and the entrance to Grand Central Terminal at the shuttle without paying a fare. This was accomplished by moving the turnstiles at the eastern end of the passageway. In March, members of the Metallic Lathers Union Local 46 sought to halt construction on the project, which was 80 percent complete, as the union objected to having the work done by city employees who made less than union workers. The rebuilt passageway opened on March 18, 1946.

On June 21, 1949, William Reid, the Chairman of the New York City Board of Transportation, announced that his capital budget request for 1950 would include $3.5 million to improve the shuttle for the first time since it was created. As part of the project, double platforms would have been constructed at both ends of the shuttle, the abandoned track 2 would have been removed, and switches would have been installed on track 3 to allow trains to pull into either platform on either track 1 or track 3. In addition, the shuttle would have been extended 200 feet (61 m) to the east to shorten transfers to the Lexington Avenue Line. Chairman Reid also stated that he would look for ways to improve service for riders before any funding arrived, noting that a way was needed to get riders to the proper platform before the car doors closed. While there were lights giving the number of the platform for the next train, they did not give passengers enough time to get to the train before their doors closed.

On October 28, 1953, the Transport Workers Union (TWU) asserted that it was impossible for its members to follow the schedule of the shuttle, which called for a train every two minutes during rush hours. Its president, Michael Quill, said that if the New York City Transit Authority took action against train crews skipping scheduled runs, there would be unrest among the TWU's members.

Between 1948 and 1951, the Stephens–Adamson Manufacturing Company and the Goodyear Tire and Rubber Company proposed that the shuttle be replaced by a pedestrian conveyor system called "Carveyor". The "Carveyor" would have consisted of a set of wheelless cars running on conveyor belts. They would have run slowly–at speeds of 1.5 miles per hour (2.4 km/h)–in stations and would have run more quickly–at speeds of 15 miles per hour (24 km/h)–between stations. 12 cars would move along the conveyor belt, and each car would have held 12 seated and 5 standing passengers. The system was expected to travel between Grand Central and Times Square in 1 minute 15 seconds, and was expected to move 18,000 passengers per hour as opposed to the 12,000 that could be accommodated by the existing shuttle. This proposal was formally presented to the Board of Transportation in March 1951. Even though New York City Transit Authority (NYCTA) and the Board of Estimate approved the plan it was not completed due to union opposition and high cost.

On April 21, 1953, Board of Transportation Chairman Sidney H. Bingham, announced that the installation of the conveyor would cost $3.8 million and could be completed in 18 months after funding was budgeted for the project. He hoped that the city and Federal Government would each foot 25% of the bill, with the remaining 50% to come from the State. Funding for the project was included in the 1953 and 1954 capital budgets. On October 19, 1954, the single bid for the project was submitted by Passenger Belt Conveyors, which was a subsidiary formed the previous month by Stephens–Adamson Corporation and Goodyear Tire. The project was expected to be completed in 550 days. The cost of the project was expected to increase to $5.5 million to pay for additional structural changes needed for the new system. On November 4, 1954, the $3,881,000 contract for a modified version of the plan was awarded. The New York Times lauded the plan, stating that "the Times Square–Grand Central subway shuttle was an atrocity from the beginning and has had no substantial improvement in a third of a century." Bids on the structure to accommodate the conveyor, which was expected to cost $1.1 million, were to be received on December 10, 1954. The contract required the approval of the New York City Board of Estimate, but never received it. In May 1955, it was announced that the project was tabled for discussion for August 25 of that year at the request of City Controller Lawrence Gerosa, who considered the plan to be dangerous. He hoped to convince the Board of Estimate to scrap the project. On September 15, 1955, the Chairman of the New York City Transit Authority, which had taken over operations of the Board of Transportation in June 1953, said that the allocation of funds for the project was questionable. On October 20, 1955, the NYCTA told the Board of Estimate that it was rescinding its request for $4,991,000 to build the conveyor. The plan was canceled due to its high cost.

In 1954, NYCTA created a design concept to reconfiguring the shuttle onto a tangent alignment under 42nd Street. This design was never executed because of the significant impact it would have had on utilities and the street above, and because it would have required a full shutdown of the station.

On August 16, 1954, a project to replace 1,000 incandescent bulbs with 2,200 feet (670 m) of new fluorescent lighting at Grand Central platform was completed. The new lighting fixtures replaced the green and red lines of light bulbs that had indicated the way to and from the shuttle, respectively, and lit up signs directing riders to the shuttle, with additional fixtures to direct riders from the shuttle to be installed in two weeks. In addition to replacing platform lighting, lighting was replaced to the mezzanine. This project, which cost $440,000, was the beginning of a program to improve lighting at old stations across the IRT system.

=== 1960s: Automation test ===
==== Testing and operation ====
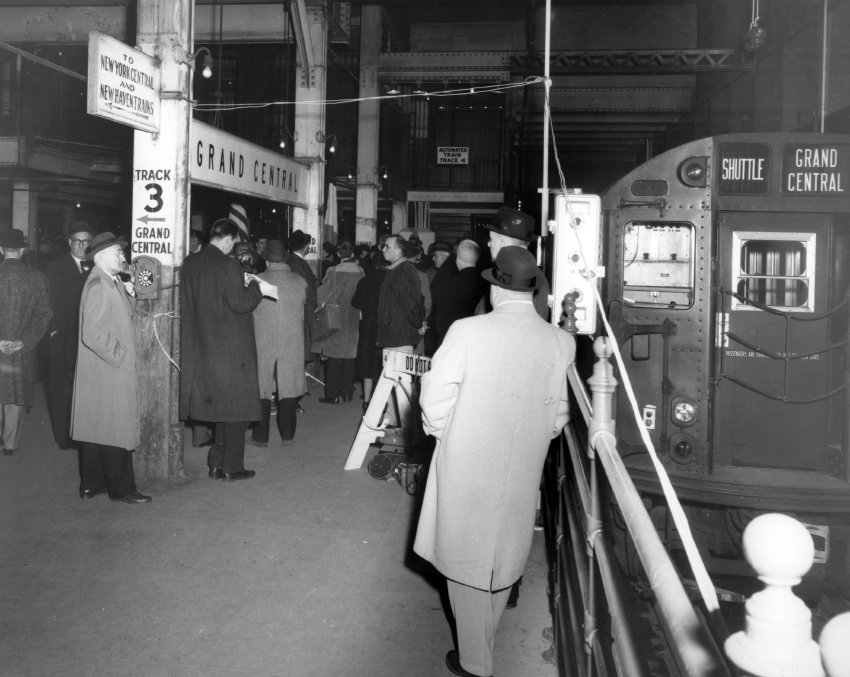
The opening of the automated train on track 4 in 1962

As part of a demonstration for automation, track 4 was briefly automated from 1962 to 1964. It was the first automated service in the New York City subway system. On January 26, 1959, the Chairman of the New York City Transit Authority (NYCTA), Charles Patterson announced that the NYCTA was exploring converting the shuttle to pilot automatic operation. If the pilot were successful, the rest of the system could be converted to automatic operation in phases. The automatic system would make use of existing tracks, platforms and rolling stock with minor modifications. The project would cost $1 million, and Patterson said that automating the shuttle would save $150,000 annually by reducing 25 train operators and conductors. If the whole system were automated, 90% of the 3,100 train operators, and 75% of the conductors and platform conductors could be eliminated.

Starting in December 1959, the fully automatic train, consisting of three cars, was tested on 2,700 feet (820 m) of one of the BMT Sea Beach Line express tracks (E4) between the 18th Avenue and New Utrecht Avenue stations. The train was equipped with a telephone system to keep voice communication with human dispatchers at the two shuttle terminals. At each station there was a cabinet that housed 24 relay systems that made up electronic dispatchers. The relays controlled the train's starting, acceleration, braking, and stopping, as well as the opening and closing of the car doors. The relays were operated by electrical impulses initiated by a punched tape. At full speed, the train ran at 30 miles per hour (48 km/h), slowing to 5.5 miles per hour (8.9 km/h) when coming into the two stations. When entering stations, the train passed through a series of detectors, which caused a series of tripper arms at trackside to go into the open position if the train was going at the speed. If the train was going too quickly, the tripper arms would stay upright and the train's brakes would automatically be set. The equipment was built and installed by the General Railway Signal Company and the Union Switch and Signal division of the Westinghouse Air Brake Company, after several years of research and development. The NYCTA contributed between $20,000 to $30,000 on the project, while the bulk of it, between $250,000 and $300,000, was contributed by the two companies. The automation of the shuttle was opposed by the president of the Transport Workers Union, Michael J. Quill, who pledged to fight the project and called the device "insane". A June 1961 report from the New York City Transit Authority (NYCTA) mentioned the automatic train was planned to be placed into service that November.

On February 29, 1960, the NYCTA began to test a new tieless roadbed on track 1, which had been installed since the previous Thursday. The experiment was intended to produce a smoother and more comfortable ride for commuters, in addition to lessening the effect of moisture and erosion. It was planned that if the test succeeded, the rest of the tracks in the subway system would be retrofitted in such a manner. The setup included two parallel strips of concrete that would serve as the roadbed. Between them, flat-bottomed steel troughs were installed, cushioned by rubber. Inside the troughs, there were rubber tie plates spaced apart with flaps that encase the rail bottom. The rails were kept in place by lug bolts that were anchored in concrete. The third rail was also mounted on concrete. This differed from the normal roadbeds, which consisted of stone, with wooden ties set into it. The ties, under damp conditions, would rot and the spikes would become loose, resulting in bumpy rides. This test replicated similar roadbeds in Toronto's subway system. In order to construct the new roadbed, track 1 had to be closed. From May 6 to June 5, 1961, track 4 was closed for the installation of the same roadbed as was tested on track 1.

In the afternoon of January 4, 1962, the three-car automated train began service, with a ceremony. The trains carried a stand-by motorman during the six-month trial period. The train had scheduled to begin service on December 15, 1961, but Quill threatened to strike all city- and private-owned transit in the city if the train ran. Under the new contract with the TWU, the NYCTA agreed to put a motorman in the train during the experimental period. While in its experimental period, the automated train was only operating during rush hours. In July, the test was extended for three more months, and in October the test was extended for six additional months. The chairman of the NYCTA, Charles Patterson, was disappointed by the automated shuttle train, doubting that the train could be operated without any transit personnel on board. Initially, the automation of the shuttle was expected to save $150,000 a year in labor costs; however, with one employee still required on the train, there would essentially be no savings. Tape recorded messages warned passengers that the doors of the train were closing. If the test succeeded, it was planned to automate the IRT Flushing Line, the Franklin Avenue Shuttle, the Myrtle Avenue Elevated, the BMT Canarsie Line, and the Culver Shuttle. However, the NYCTA did not have plans to automate the whole system.

==== Demise ====
On April 16, 1964, an automated train derailed on the northernmost track east of Times Square during the morning rush hour, causing a short circuit, and thus, suspending service on all three tracks.

A severe fire at the Grand Central station on April 21, 1964, destroyed the demonstration train and resulted in the subsequent restoration of manual operations. The fire began under a shuttle train on track 3, and it became larger, feeding on the wooden platform. The train on track 1 was saved when the motorman saw smoke, and reversed the train. The basements of nearby buildings were damaged. Tracks 1 and 4 returned to service on April 23, 1964, while track 3 returned to service on June 1, 1964. The reinstallation of track 3 was delayed because of the need to replace 60 beams that were damaged in the fire. Initially, a decision was not made concerning whether or not the automated shuttle train should be reintroduced.

From September 19, 1966, to April 1967, service on the shuttle was limited in order to allow for the reconstruction of parts of the line. The entire project cost $419,000 and included the construction of a new mezzanine at Grand Central and the replacement of the wooden platform at Times Square with a new concrete one of 300 feet (91 m). As part of the project, the tiles damaged by the smoke from the fire were replaced with tiles in the city's colors of blue, white and orange, with black tiles interspersed. In addition, fluorescent lighting, which was 12 times brighter than the old lighting, was installed.

=== 1980s–2000s ===
In 1978, the United States Department of Transportation undertook a study to analyze and determine the feasibility of installing an Accelerating Walkway System in an urban environment. The study used the 42nd Street Shuttle as a case study. The two options the study analyzed were a one-directional reversible linear walkway and a bi-directional loop. The study found that the walkways would provide a better level of service during off-peak hours and a similar level of service during peak hours. It was estimated that it would cost between $5.4 million and $13 million to install the system.

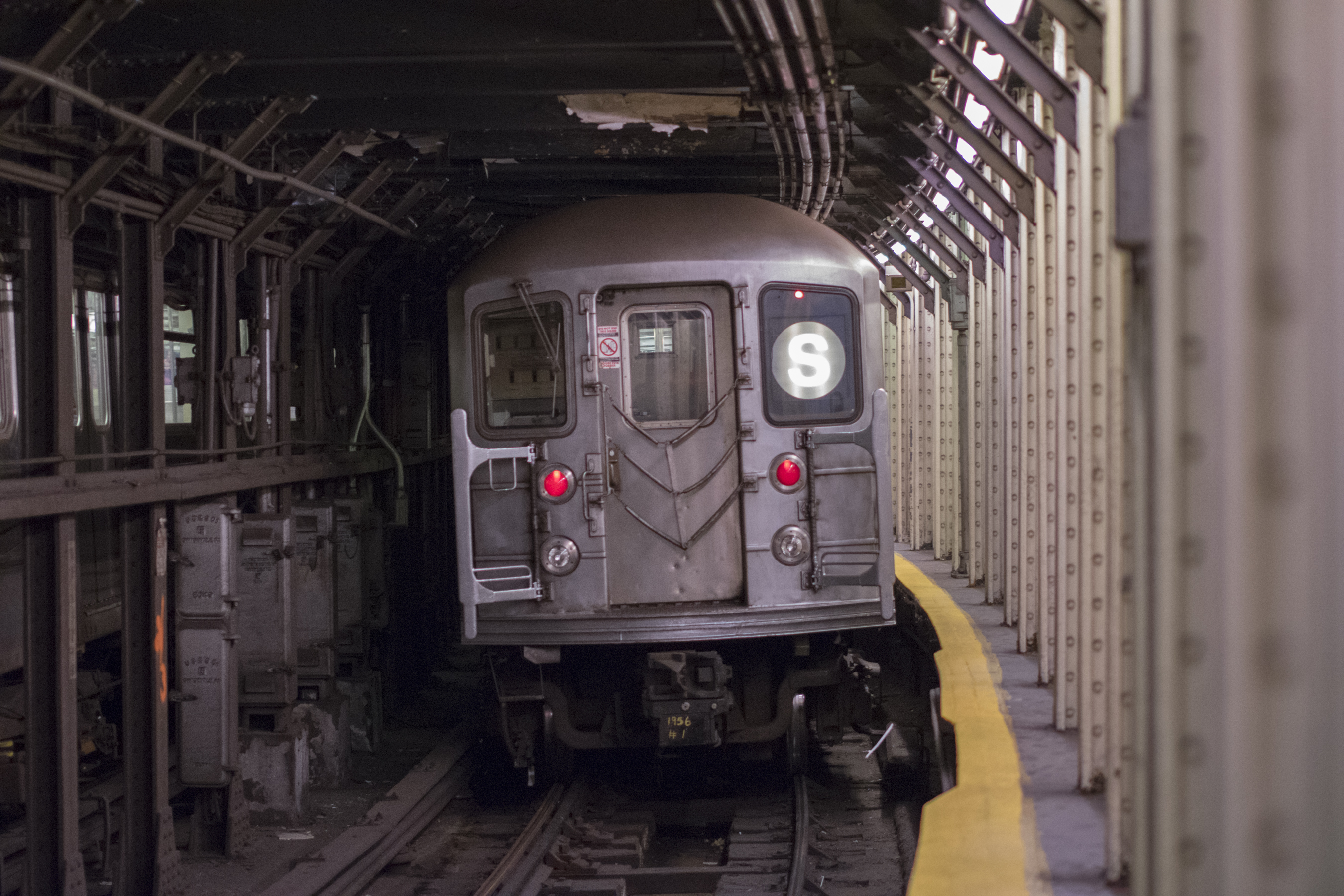
An R62A consist (one car pictured) in service on track 3 of the 42nd Street Shuttle, prior to renovation

On October 3, 1987, ten R62s made their debut on the shuttle, replacing the R17s that previously ran on the shuttle. In June 1992, these were replaced by R62As.

On November 17, 1988, the NYCTA announced plans to drop $343 million of projects from its Capital Program, including $23 million allocated for the reconfiguration of the Shuttle. The shuttle would have been rebuilt with two tracks and the platforms at Times Square would have been moved closer to other subway lines. Work was to begin in 1991, but was deferred so it could be done in conjunction with other rehabilitation work at Times Square, which was delayed.

The shuttle ran at all times until September 10, 1995, when night service was discontinued in order to avoid raising fares, meaning that late-night passengers had to use the 7 train. New York City Transit had been expecting a $160 million surplus in 1995, but due to reductions in state and Federal contributions, it was left with a deficit expected to reach $172 million. The elimination of late night service was part of a larger plan to reduce spending in order to avert a fare increase, which Governor George Pataki and Mayor Rudy Giuliani had pressured the Metropolitan Transportation Authority (MTA) to avoid. Eliminating night service on the shuttle was done to avoid the need to reduce service on corridors without alternate service. Shuttle service had been running every ten minutes overnight, and was used by 275 passengers per hour.

On February 28, 2005, a shuttle train crashed into the bumper block of track 3 at Grand Central, injuring the train operator and hospitalizing two passengers. The crash caused $100,000 in damage to the 4-car train. The New York State Public Transportation Safety Board's investigation into the collision concluded that the most likely cause of the accident was the train operator falling asleep while operating the train, which led to his overrunning the stop sign and colliding into the bumper block.

=== Reconstruction ===
==== Planning ====
In 1998, MTA officials announced that the Times Square station would be renovated and that the entire complex would become compliant with the Americans with Disabilities Act of 1990 (ADA). The project was to be split into two phases, each lasting four years; the renovation of the 42nd Street Shuttle platforms would occur during the second phase of renovations. However, the curved platforms at Times Square made it very difficult to convert to ADA standards, and the shuttle platform renovation project was delayed. Although planning was completed in 2006, the project was delayed due to a lack of funding.

In 2014 and 2015, the MTA commissioned WSP to undertake constructibility and feasibility studies to increase capacity on the shuttle and to make it ADA-accessible. NYCT called for a plan that would include a wider center platform to accommodate two six-car trains to the east of the existing station. WSP developed a plan that allowed the shuttle to be reconstructed without any need to excavate along 42nd Street. The initial study, TO-1, only called for the elimination of 36 columns along platform edges to align with train doors, and for the elimination of 20 columns in the concourse area. This plan would have kept the remaining platform columns, which are located every 5 feet (1.5 m). NYCT considered using platform screen doors to separate trains from the platforms. NYCT then asked WSP to engage in a study, TO-3, to look into eliminating all platform edge columns while keeping the station open with minimal impacts.

==== Funding and approval ====
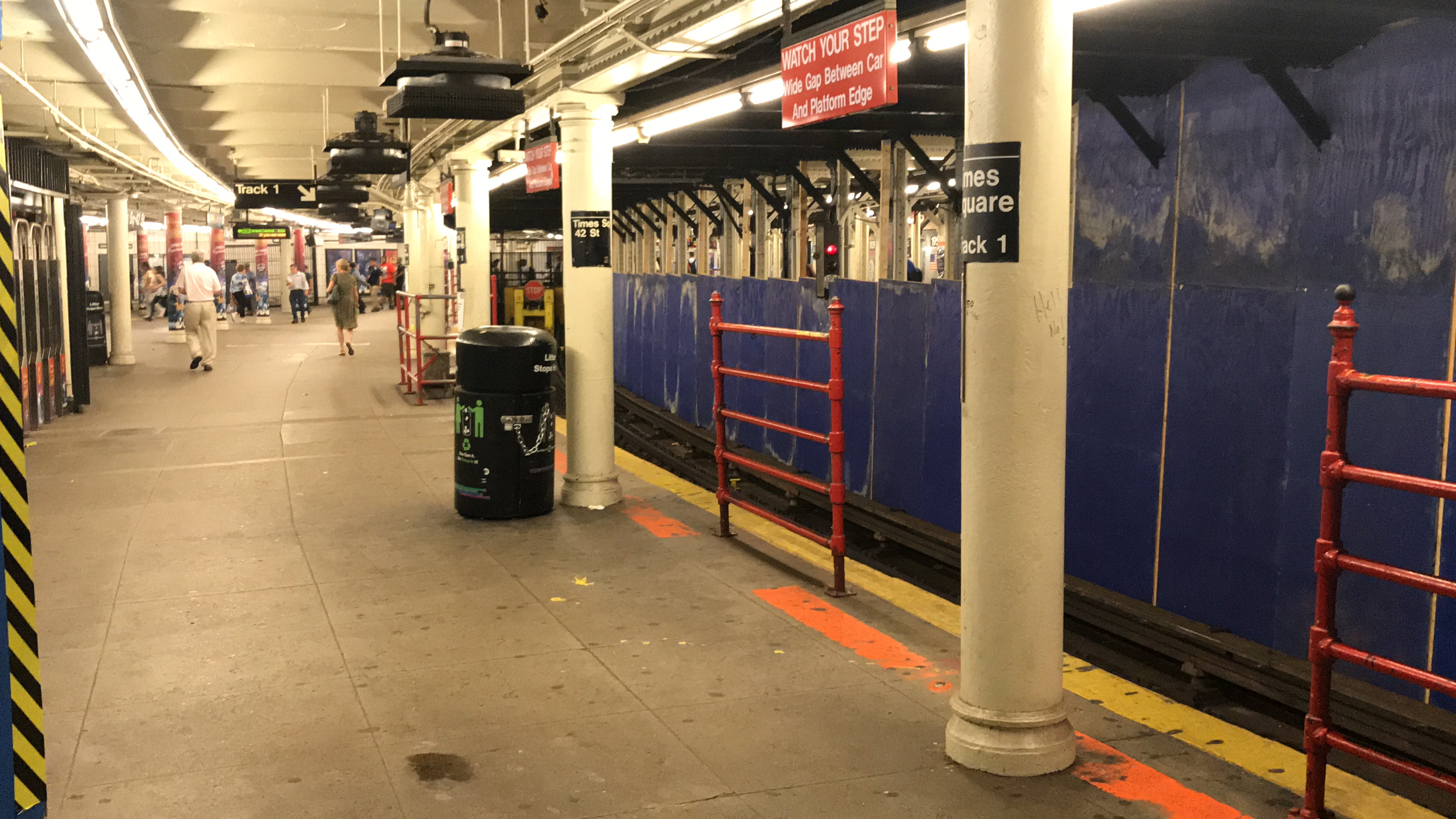
The Times Square station starting a renovation project; the platform is covered by blue construction walls

Initially, $1 million in funding for a study to develop the requirements for a second program to automate the shuttle was included in the 2015–2019 MTA Capital Program. However, this study was removed from the program in the July 2017 amendment to the Capital Program.

Funding for the renovation of the Times Square shuttle platforms and the reconfiguration of the shuttle was provided as part of the 2015–2019 MTA Capital Program. Improving access to Times Square will cost $28.93 million, while the reconfiguration project will cost $235.41 million. The contract for the construction of the project was originally scheduled to be awarded in June 2018. However, this was delayed by several months because of changes to the project schedule and cost. The construction duration was expected to be extended by three months, and the cost would increase by $25 million, because of additions to the original construction plan. A construction contract was awarded on March 7, 2019, with an estimated completion date of March 2022. The project is expected to take three years to complete. On August 2, 2019, the MTA announced that work on the project would begin on August 16.

Work on the project will be completed in multiple phases, which were originally intended to create minor reductions in service, since only one track at a time would be taken out of service for construction. During the first phase of work, service operated on tracks 1 and 4. The second phase of work began on October 6, 2019, with service being limited to tracks 3 and 4. During this phase, only three of the four cars of the train on track 3 were available for use. On November 8, 2019, the MTA solicited bids for a consultant to manage, oversee, and coordinate work on construction projects taking place in the subway system between Times Square and Grand Central, in order to improve customer communication, minimize inconveniences, and to reduce the length and cost of these projects by bundling work. In January 2020, the MTA announced that it would package work on eight projects along 42nd Street, including the work to renovate the 42nd Street Shuttle, together into the newly branded 42nd Street Connection Project. The new approach was expected to reduce the time needed to complete renovations on the shuttle from 49 months to 36 months, allowed for the reengineering of project scope to reduce cost overruns, and improved the schedule of subway service during work. In February, work began on surveying the area that will be the new connection between the Times Square and Bryant Park stations.

On April 6, 2020, a new phase of work on the project was scheduled to begin, with service then only running on tracks 1 and 3. However, on that date, New York City Transit issued a General Order that called for a complete shutdown of the line until December 31, 2020. Because the shuttle was already temporarily shut down due to the COVID-19 pandemic in New York City, the upgrades were expedited by two months. These upgrades included work laying new trackbed and track, and improvements in drainage and flood mitigation systems. The closure of the shuttle allowed the contractor to fix an unexpected tunnel settlement condition at Times Square, which would have otherwise delayed the project by three to four months.

Despite the General Order, the shuttle reopened on August 10, 2020, to accommodate passengers displaced by unrelated construction on the Lexington Avenue Line, which caused a partial closure of that line. At midnight on November 7, 2020, another phase of work on the project began as track 3 was taken out of passenger service. Shuttle service on track 4 resumed on November 9. As part of this phase of work, track 3 and its infrastructure was removed to allow for the construction of new platforms. In addition, structural work, and new power and signaling systems will be completed, and work will also begin on the new transfer passageway between the Times Square and Bryant Park stations. As of December 2020, work on the project was 55 percent complete. In preparation for the opening of the new platform, weekend service ran on a single track during July and August 2021, and the shuttle was closed for four days in July and twelve days in August and September 2021. The new platforms finally opened on September 7, 2021.

==== Components ====
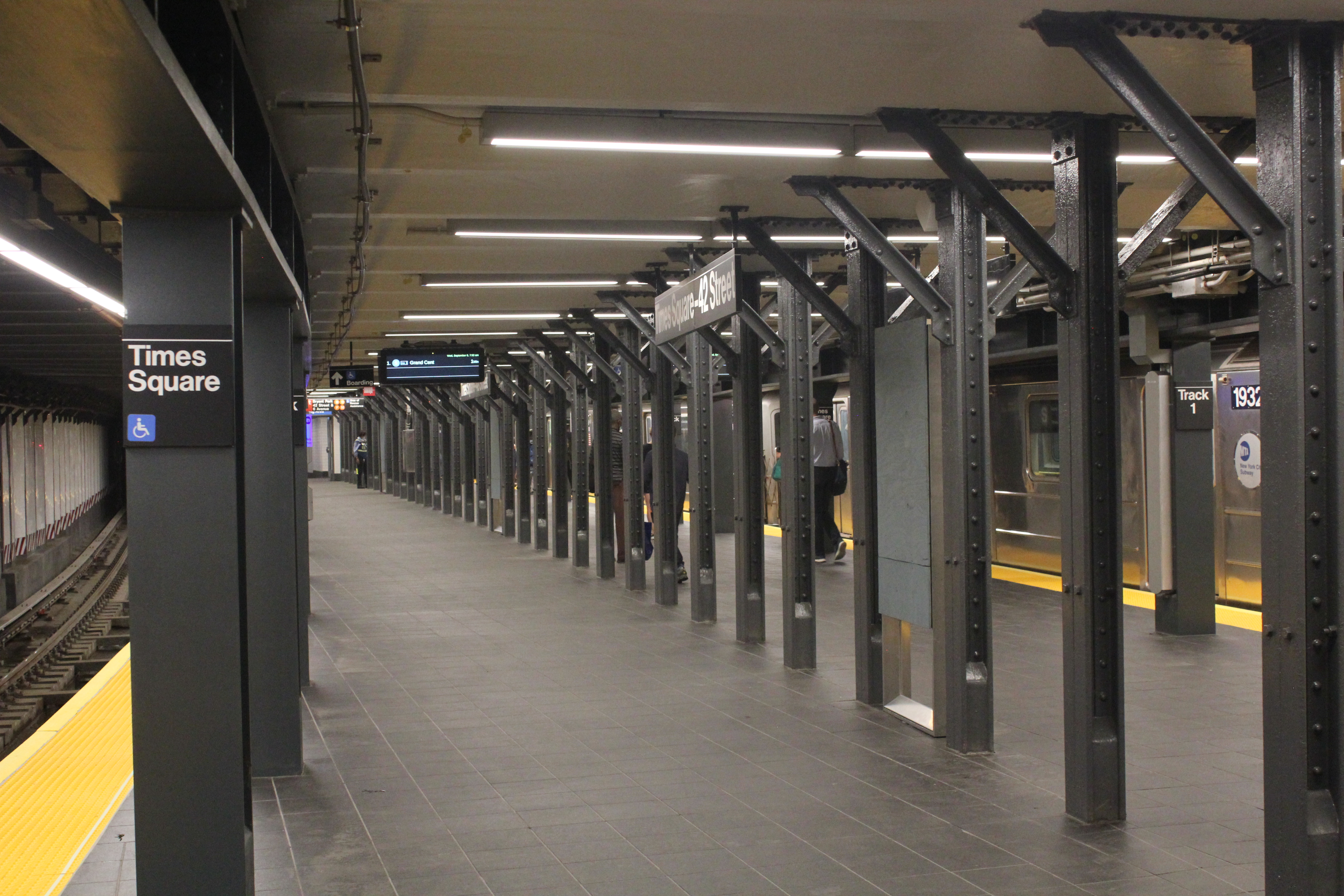
Widened platform at Times Square, which was built during the reconstruction project

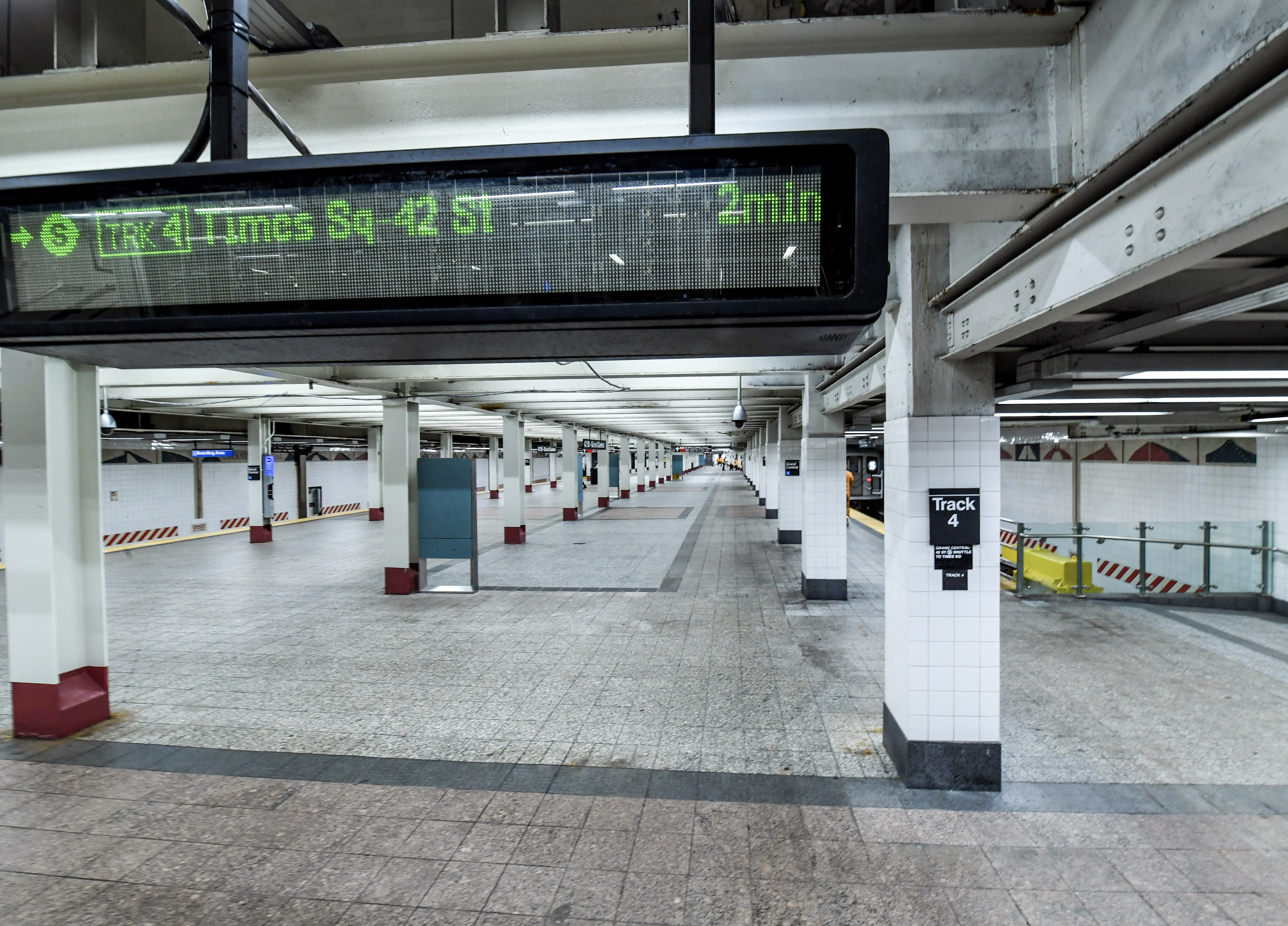
Widened platform at Grand Central, which was built during the reconstruction project. The former location of Track 3 is visible in the tilework.

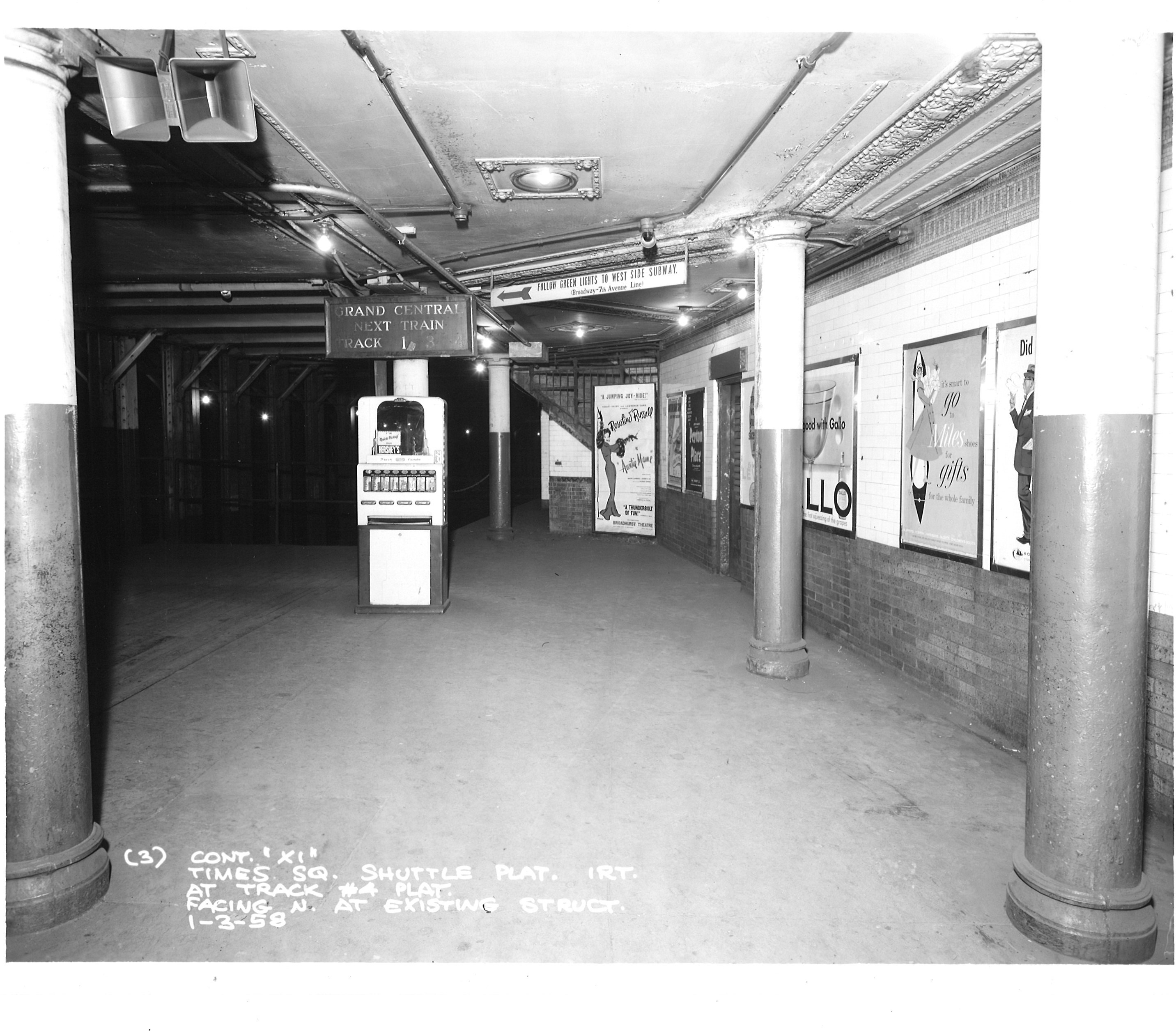
The platform on Track 4, as seen here in 1958, was closed off as part of the reconstruction project

As part of the project, the 42nd Street Shuttle became ADA-accessible, and track 3 was removed, reducing the shuttle from three to two tracks. As part of the project, train reliability will be improved with the installation of a new signal system, replacing the existing system, which dates back to the 1930s. The new signaling system will not use communications-based train control (CBTC), but will be CBTC-ready.

The shuttle now runs with two six-car trains, compared to the two three-car trains used for tracks 1 and 4, and the one four-car train used on the former track 3, increasing capacity by 20 percent, from 100 cars of capacity per hour to 120 per hour. Times Square and Grand Central stations were reconfigured with wide island platforms, and access improvements will be completed at Times Square. Certain features of the Times Square station would be repaired and restored, and to increase capacity, 122 5-foot (1.5 m) spaced columns between the trackways and 11 mezzanine columns were removed and replaced by 45 new 15-foot (4.6 m) spaced columns that are at least two feet away from the platform edges for safety and to provide space for tactile warning strips. These columns will be supported by 45 new foundations. A plaque describing the history of the station was installed underneath the replicated Knickerbocker lintel.

At Times Square, a new 28-foot-wide (8.5 m) and 315-foot-long (96 m) platform was built atop the trackways of tracks 2 and 3, the former express tracks of the original subway. The platform will extend 360 feet (110 m) to the east, and will be flanked by track 1 on the south and track 4 on the north. Passengers at Times Square are no longer able to board trains on track 1 from the south, as the track would be cut back a few hundred feet to the east, and as a portion of the area used for boarding will be used for the reconfiguration of the fare control area for the entrance leading to the southeast corner of 42nd Street and Broadway. Passengers are also no longer able to board trains on track 4 from the north; extending the platform to the east allowed for the abandonment of the platform currently serving trains on track 4, which is on a very sharp curve and has gap fillers to bridge a large gap between the platform and trains. This platform will be converted into employee space. The exit to 43rd Street was closed, covered over, and turned into an emergency exit starting on October 19, 2019, allowing the metal bridge over track 4 to access the exit to be removed, which in turn will eliminate the need to remove the bridge every time a train on track 4 needed to be removed from service. As a result of the changes, dwell times will slightly be reduced at Times Square.

As part of the redevelopment of One Times Square, a new 15-foot-wide (4.6 m) entrance with a glass canopy will be built. A new elevator to the building's observation deck will be installed and maintained by Jamestown Developers. The entrance will replace the exit to 43rd Street and will lead to the west side of Broadway between 42nd Street and 43rd Street, as well as a previously closed exit to the northeastern corner of 42nd Street and Seventh Avenue. The space currently used by passengers heading to and from the 43rd Street exit or to and from trains on track 4 will be placed outside of fare control for this new entrance. The portion of the existing station to the west of this new control area will no longer be accessible to passengers. To the west of the end of the platform on track 4, a wall decorated by artwork will be installed, blocking the view of the connection between track 4 and the Broadway–Seventh Avenue Line.

A new underpass at the eastern end of the new platform was originally planned to be constructed. This underpass was to pass under track 4 and lead to an existing easement passageway in the basement of the Bank of America Tower. A new fare control area was to be constructed at the west end of the passageway, leading to a new entrance on the north side of 42nd Street between Broadway and Sixth Avenue. The passageway was to be used for a free transfer to the IND Sixth Avenue Line's 42nd Street–Bryant Park station, allowing passengers access to the B, D, F, and M trains. The underpass was to be mined below track 4, and trains running on the track would have been supported by micropiles and skeletonized track. In July 2021, the MTA amended the contract to eliminate the passageway under track 4 in favor of a new 300-foot-long (91 m) ramp between tracks 1 and 4, connecting at its eastern end to two staircases to the Sixth Avenue Line. The amendment was made because the Bank of America Tower's owner The Durst Organization did not want to pay for the new underpass, as it had been obliged to do, and because mining the underpass would have disrupted shuttle service.

At Grand Central, the center track, track 3, was removed and the two existing platforms were connected, providing one wide island platform, with an area of 22,000 square feet (2,000 m^{2}). This became the largest platform in the subway system. The existing northern platform was extended further west to accommodate six-car trains, using existing employee facility rooms. New consolidated employee facility rooms were constructed on the existing location of the switch connecting tracks 1 and 3. The P-4 staircase at the western end of the station leading to Madison Avenue from the existing northern platform was demolished and the P-3 staircase leading there from the existing southern platform was considerably widened.

=== Post-reconstruction ===
In September 2024, the MTA announced that it had finished retrofitting the 42nd Street Shuttle tunnels with 5G cell service. This made the 42nd Street Shuttle the first New York City Subway line to be fully equipped with 5G.

== Track layout ==
Of the four shuttle tracks, only two are in use as of 2020; the former express track spaces are used as platform space at each terminal. The former southbound local track is now shuttle track 1. Tracks 2 and 3 no longer exist, but the trackbed of track 2 can be seen inside the tunnel from passing trains on track 1. At the two terminals, the trackway for track 2 was occupied by platforms that formerly provided access to track 3, which was the former northbound express track. There was also a switch between tracks 1 and 3 just west of Grand Central station. The former northbound local track, track 4, was not connected to either track 1 or track 3. Track 2 was removed between the two stations in 1975, and circuit breaker houses have been constructed on the roadbed of track 2. Track 3, the former northbound express track, was taken out of service on November 7, 2020, then removed in 2021. Prior to the 2020 renovation at the Times Square station, in order to provide a connection between the platform for track 4, the former 43rd Street entrance, and the rest of the station complex, there was a pedestrian bridge over track 4. The pedestrian bridge could be temporarily removed to allow the train on track 4 to leave for maintenance on an as-needed basis.

Track 1 is connected to the IRT Lexington Avenue Line's southbound local track south of Grand Central station. Track 4 connects to the IRT Broadway–Seventh Avenue Line's northbound local track north of Times Square station. Since 1918, it has been physically impossible for a train to go from the IRT Lexington Avenue Line to the IRT Broadway–Seventh Avenue Line or vice versa by using the shuttle tracks.

== Operation ==
Service	Time period		Section of line
Service	All except nights	Late nights	Section of line
42nd Street Shuttle service	service	no service	entire line, tracks 1 and 4 only

The shuttle operates at all times except between midnight and 5:50 a.m. weekdays, and between midnight and 6:00 a.m. weekends, when alternate service is provided by the parallel 7 train. When in service, each of the shuttle trains uses its own track; e.g., the train on track 1 simply runs back and forth on track 1, and there is no switching involved in reversing at each terminal. To provide for quick turnaround of the shuttle trains, there is a motorman at each end of the train. Depending on which direction the train is traveling the operators swap jobs when the train gets to one end; one acts as the operator in the front and the other acts as conductor in the rear. Trains run on weekdays every 2 to 4 minutes during rush hours and every 5 minutes at other times. On weekends, trains run every 5 minutes during daytime hours and every 10 minutes during the early morning and late evening. 10 trains per hour run on each track in each direction. It takes 90 seconds for trains to travel between Times Square and Grand Central, and trains reach a top speed of 30 miles per hour (48 km/h) before they have to decelerate. Prior to the shuttle's renovation project, shuttle service was provided by three-car trains on tracks 1 and 4, and a four-car train on track 3.

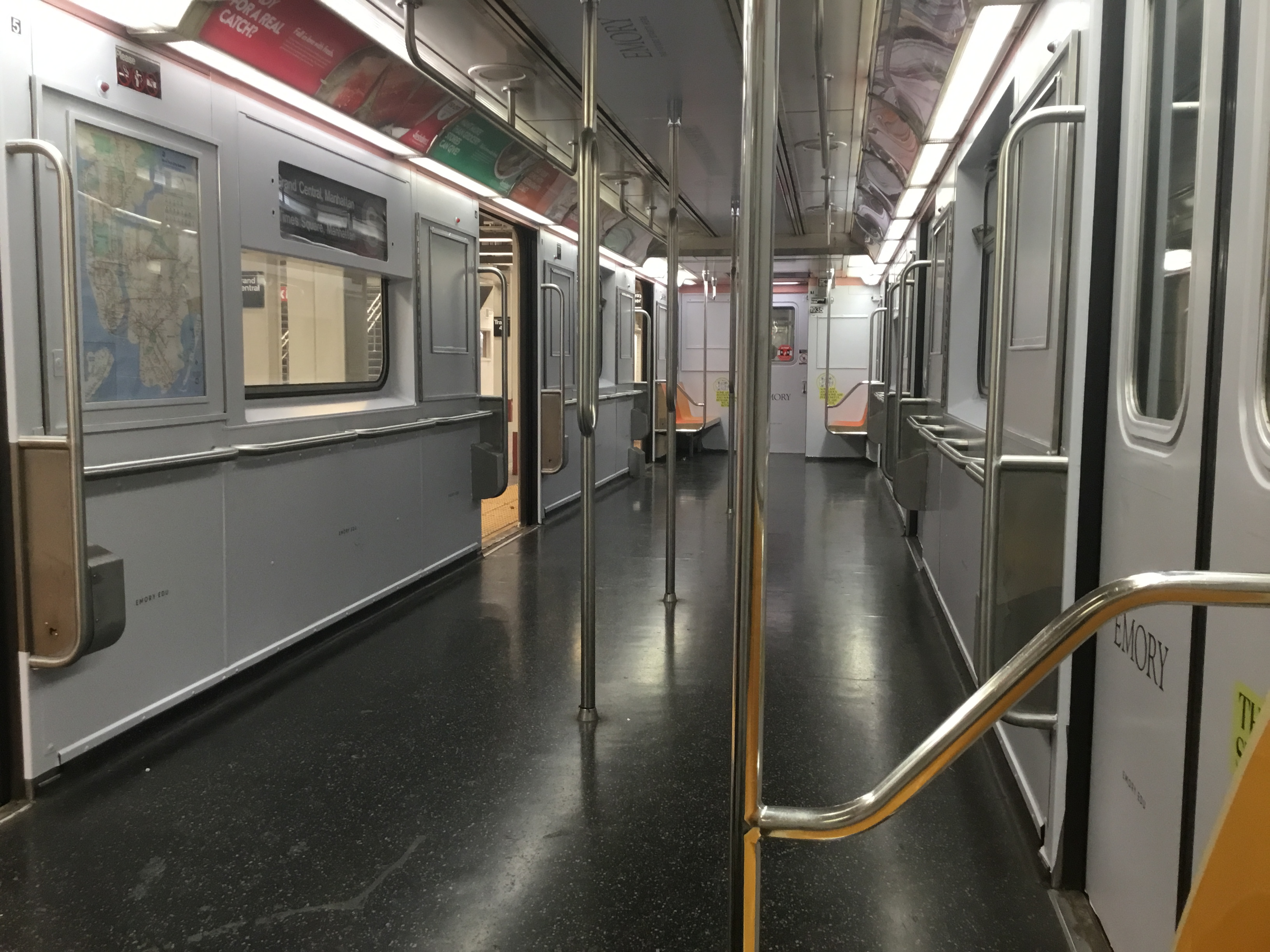
The interior of an R62A subway car used on the 42nd Street Shuttle, which was retrofitted to increase capacity

It is common for shuttle trains to display advertising that entirely covers the interiors and exteriors of the train, as opposed to other routes, whose stock only displays advertising on placards inside the train. Since 2008, the MTA has tested full-train advertisements on 42nd Street Shuttle rolling stock. While most advertisements are well received, a few advertisements have been controversial. Among the more contentious wraps that were withdrawn are a 2015 ad for the TV show The Man in the High Castle, which featured a Nazi flag, and an ad for FS1, in which a shuttle train and half of its seats were plastered with negative quotes about the New York Knicks, one of the city's NBA teams.

When the shuttle is closed, the area is sometimes used for movie and TV filming. For instance, some scenes from The French Connection were filmed on the 42nd Street Shuttle.

== Signage history ==
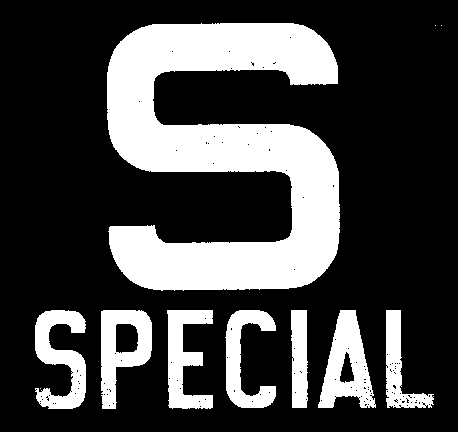
The "S" bullet was also used instead of the "Shuttle" bullet

1967-1968 bullet

1968-1979 bullet

The current bullet used since 1979

== Stations ==
Station service legend
Stops all times	Stops 24 hours a day
Stops all times except late nights	Stops every day during daytime hours only
Stops weekdays during the day	Stops during weekday daytime hours only
Stops rush hours in the peak direction only	Stops weekdays in the peak direction only
Time period details
Disabled access	Station is compliant with the Americans with Disabilities Act
↑	Station is compliant with the Americans with Disabilities Act in the indicated direction only
↓	Station is compliant with the Americans with Disabilities Act in the indicated direction only
	Elevator access to mezzanine only

42nd Street Shuttle service	Stations	Disabled access	Subway transfers	Connections
Manhattan
42nd Street Line
Stops all times except late nights	Times Square	Disabled access	1 2 3 (IRT Broadway–Seventh Avenue Line); 7 <7> (IRT Flushing Line); A C E (IND Eighth Avenue Line at 42nd Street–Port Authority Bus Terminal); N Q R W (BMT Broadway Line); B D F <F> M (IND Sixth Avenue Line at 42nd Street–Bryant Park, daytime only)	Port Authority Bus Terminal; M34A Select Bus Service
Stops all times except late nights	Grand Central	Disabled access	4 5 6 <6> (IRT Lexington Avenue Line); 7 <7> (IRT Flushing Line)	Metro-North Railroad at Grand Central Terminal; Long Island Rail Road at Grand Central Madison

== See also ==
- S (New York City Subway service), a designation that the 42nd Street Shuttle shares with two other services:
  - Franklin Avenue Shuttle
  - Rockaway Park Shuttle
- Two-stop shuttles in other systems:
  - The Waterloo & City line on the London Underground
  - The Ramal on the Madrid Metro
  - Line 12 on the Barcelona Metro
  - Disneyland Resort line on the Hong Kong Mass Transit Railway
  - The Tünel (also known as F2 line) on the Istanbul Metro
