= The Strain (disambiguation) =

The Strain is a 2009 vampire horror novel by Guillermo del Toro and Chuck Hogan.

The Strain may also refer to:

- The Strain (TV series) based on the novel
- The Strain Comic Book Series by Dark Horse Comics, also based on the novel

== See also ==
- Strain (disambiguation)
