= S Train =

S-train is a type of suburban railway system.

S Train and similar names may also refer to:

- S-train (Copenhagen), an urban rapid transit network in Denmark
- Mestský vlak Bratislava (marked S train but called Mestský vlak or just vlak), an urban rapid transit network in Slovakia something like the Copenhagen S tog. Website will be added later
- S-Train (Korail), a South Korean sightseeing train
- S-Train (Seibu), an express train service operated by Seibu Railway in Tokyo, Japan
- S (New York City Subway service), one of three subway services of the New York City Subway:
  - Franklin Avenue Shuttle
  - 42nd Street Shuttle (also called the Grand Central/Times Square Shuttle) (internally referred to as the 0)
  - Rockaway Park Shuttle (also called Rockaway Shuttle) (internally referred to as the H)
- S Castro Shuttle in San Francisco
- S Line (Utah Transit Authority), a streetcar running between Salt Lake City and South Salt Lake in Utah, United States that is operated by the Utah Transit Authority
- S-Train variant of MTR CNR Changchun EMU, a driverless three-car multiple unit operating on the South Island line of Hong Kong
- Milan S Lines, the commuter rail system of the city of Milan, Italy
