= Strain (surname) =

Strain is a surname. Notable people with the surname include:

- Christina Strain (born 1981), comic book colorist
- Isaac Strain (1821–1857), American/Canadian explorer
- John Paul Strain (born 1955), American illustrator and artist
- Julie Strain (1962–2021), American actress and model and musician
- Michael G. Strain (born 1958), Commissioner of Agriculture & Forestry in the U.S. state of Louisiana
- Rob Strain, NASA Goddard Center director
- Ryan Strain (born 1997), Australian footballer
- Ted Strain (1917–1999), American basketball player
- Malcolm Wheeler-Nicholson (1890–1968), born Malcolm Strain, American writer
- Dana Plato (1964–1999), born Dana Michelle Strain, American actress
