= Strain, Arkansas =

- Unincorporated community
- Strain's position in Arkansas. Strain, Arkansas (the United States)
- Coordinates: 36°00′48.3″N 94°03′57.7″W
- Country: United States
- State: Arkansas
- County: Washington
- Township: Richland
- Elevation: 1,204 ft (367 m)
- Time zone: UTC-6 (Central (CST))
  - Summer (DST): UTC-5 (CDT)
- Area code: 479
- GNIS feature ID: 81633

Strain is an unincorporated community in Richland Township, Washington County, Arkansas, United States. It is located between Fayetteville and Elkins. The community consists of a small number of homes located around a road junction near the Middle Fork White River.

A post office called Strain was established in 1884, and remained in operation until 1888.
