= Thomas H. O'Shea =

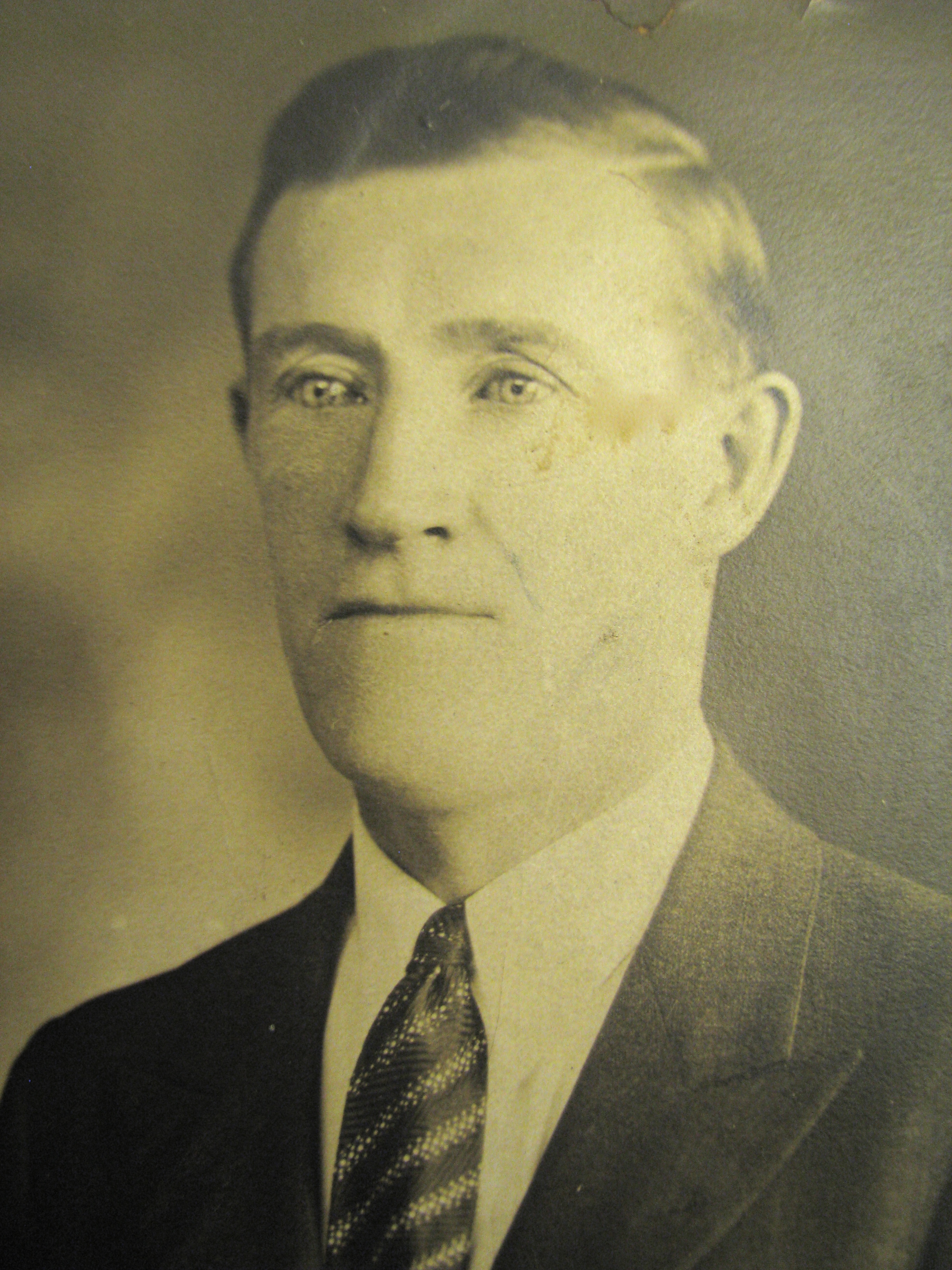
Thomas H. O'Shea 1934

Thomas Humphrey O'Shea (October 21, 1898 – June 6, 1962) was an Irish revolutionary and one of the founders of the Transport Workers Union of America (TWU), subway workers in New York City that expanded to represent members in other forms of transit nationwide. O'Shea was appointed the first President of the TWU in 1934. He was later ousted and replaced by longtime TWU President Michael J. Quill. O'Shea subsequently spent some years battling reported Communism within the union, culminating in his 1940 testimony before the House Committee on Un-American Activities chaired by Rep. Martin Dies of Texas and commonly referred to as the Dies Committee at the time.

== Early Years in Ireland ==
O'Shea was born in Queenstown (now Cobh), County Cork, Ireland on October 21, 1898, son of a former Royal Irish Constabulary officer and Royal Navy clerk Patrick O'Shea and farm owner Mary Kirby. A school trained chemist, his Irish Volunteers activity during the Irish War of Independence began in 1915 with the 4th Battalion, Cork No.1 Brigade in Cobh and ended shortly after the Irish Civil War came to a close in 1923. He spent several months after the official end of the war, engaged in guerrilla activities.

During the war of independence and the Irish Civil War, he conducted numerous raids against the British Army, RIC, Black and Tans and Royal Defence Corps and manufactured land mines and grenades, using them with frequency. In late 1919, he participated on the attack against the Ballyquirke Military Aerodrome, under the overall command of Terence MacSwiney. In January 1920, he took part in an assault on the RIC barracks in Carrigtwohill, under O/C Mick Leahy. This is notable as the first 'official' attack on any RIC barracks.

In August 1920, O'Shea was part of an ambush of Cameron Highlanders, an infantry regiment of the British Army, that captured rifles and other arms. In July 1921, after recovering from suffering injuries in an explosion in April, he was assigned as a battalion officer in charge of engineering with sections in Knocraha, Midleton, Fota and Cobh. During the civil war, he moved headquarters from the Midleton police barracks to Lord Barrymore's estate at Fota Island after the expulsion of Irish Free State forces.

Even as the Free State gained strength and the IRA forces waned, O'Shea continued to engineer bombings, notably at two bridge approaches to Cobh at Belvelly and Fota. As the Irish Volunteers morphed into the Irish Republican Army, O'Shea was incarcerated 5 times during the wars. He participated in a hunger strike at Wormwood Scrubs (HM Prison) led by Joseph McGrath in London from April to May 1920 and also escaped from Cork Male Prison with 30 men in August 1922 through a prisoner constructed tunnel.

In October 1923, O'Shea led a 2nd hunger strike with Frank Oakley at Mountjoy Prison that, despite Irish Free State media suppression, spread across Ireland, with 8,000 jailed strikers participating. The 4th arrest was immediately after release from Mountjoy at Sinn Féin Headquarters during Dennis Barry's funeral. He escaped Cork Court House two weeks later. On May 9, 1924, he was arrested for the fifth and final time but released shortly thereafter in a general amnesty.

== TWU ==
O'Shea spent the next 3 years in Liverpool mobilizing Irish revolutionary expatriates. In October 1927, he immigrated to New York along with a number of former Irish Volunteers: Daithi O'Brien, Thomas Walsh, Gerald O'Reilly, Austin Hogan and Mick Leahy. By early 1932, O'Shea was involved with the expat movement Clan na Gael, attempting to organize New York City subway workers while being current employees of the Interborough Rapid Transit Company.

Accustomed to the secrecy of Clan na Gael, the organizers moved cautiously, first looking for help from Irish organizations, such as the Ancient Order of Hibernians and the Friendly Sons of St. Patrick and finally seeking the support of the Communist Party USA in the formation of the TWU. The TWU declared its aim to represent all public transit workers in the city, regardless of craft and fight all wages cuts and many of the unions early clandestine meetings took place at O'Shea's apartment in the Bronx.

As IRT employees, organizers O'Shea and Quill felt the collective plight of their peers and gained their trust and confidence using smart and determined organizing techniques, and by refusing to discriminate. Two incidents further strengthened the TWU cause: the transit strikes of 1935 and an attack on O'Shea, Quill and other organizers at Grand Central Terminal by company thugs that, ironically, led to the TWU men's arrest. Hundred of TWU workers descended on city hall demanding the release of their leaders which led to mainstream support.

== Dies Committee ==
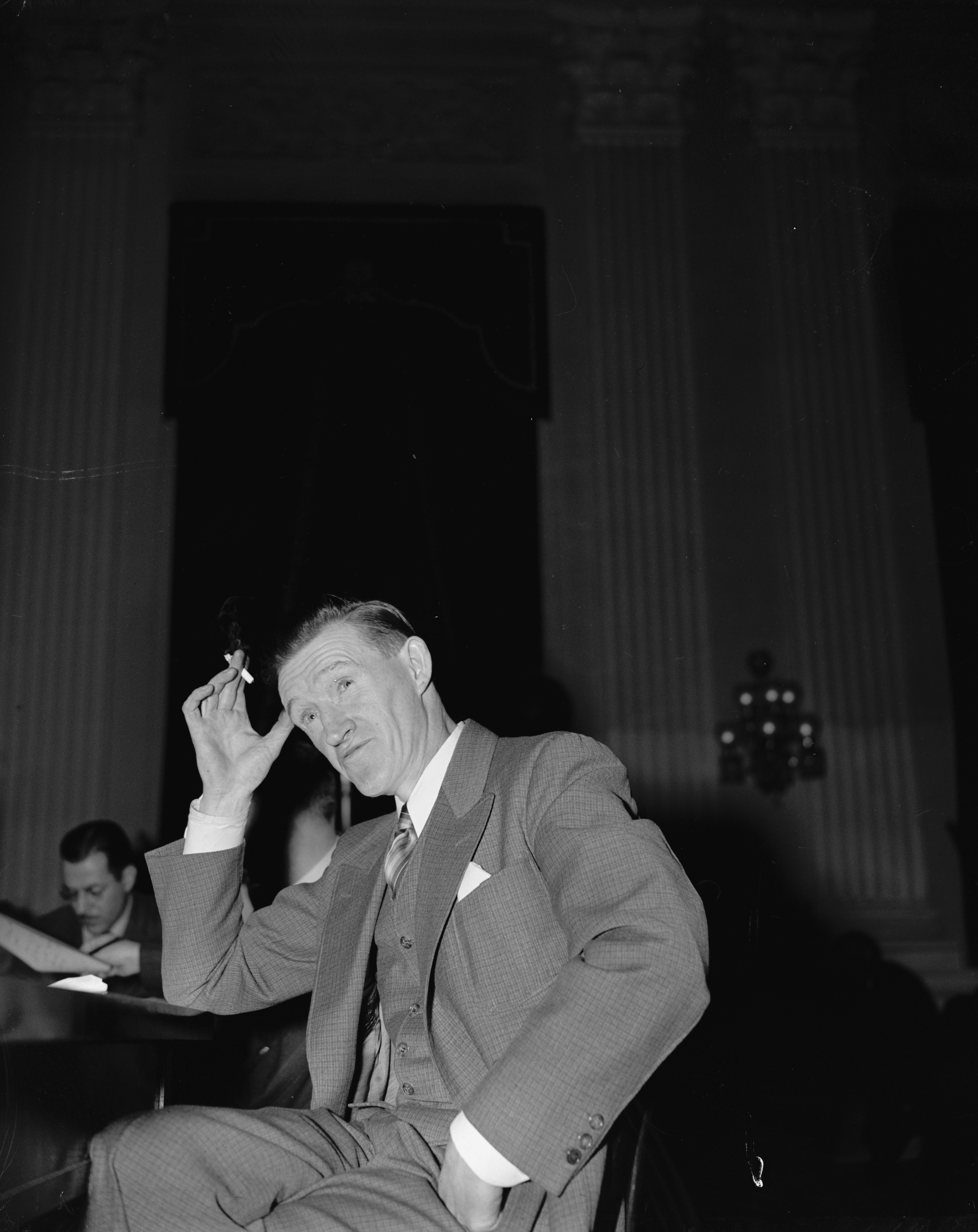
O'Shea testifies before the Dies Committee, April 23, 1940

Growing dissolution with the Communist Party, a tendency to advocate for violence as an organizing device and losing the presidency to Quill led to O'Shea's expulsion from the union.

In April 1940, O'Shea testified at the Dies Committee or the House Committee on Un-American Activities against his former union compatriots, particularly Michael Quill. He said that the union was in the complete control of US communists and among their goals was revolution through strikes. During his own testimony, Quill vehemently denied the charges and called O'Shea a stool pigeon but later purged communists from the TWU after the 2nd World War.

Bouts with alcoholism and other problems landed O'Shea homeless on the Bowery for the mid to late 1950s finally taken in by the Bowery Mission. 1960 his wife, Hilda, accepted the sober O'Shea back to the home in the Bronx. He died June 6, 1962, and is buried in Saint Raymond's Cemetery.

In 2013, O'Shea's work as a union activist was posthumously honored with an Irish Echo Labor Award during a ceremony at the Sheraton New York Times Square Hotel.

== Sources ==
- McCarthy, Keiran, Republican Cobh & The East Cork Volunteers, Dublin: Nonsuch Publishing, 2008
- O'Shea, Thomas Humphrey, Military Service Certificate - Service Pensions Act, 1934, Dublin: Military Archives Cathal Brugha Barracks
- Freeman, Joshua B., In Transit: The Transport Workers Union in New York City 1933–1966, New York: Oxford University Press, 1989
- Whitemore, L.H., The Man Who Ran the Subways, New York: Holt, Rinehart and Winston, 1968
- twu.org

Trade union offices
Preceded by Union founded	President of the Transport Workers Union of America; 1934–1936	Succeeded by Mike Quill
