= Strain theory =

Strain theory may refer to:

- Baeyer strain theory, an explanation of relative stabilities of cyclic molecules
- Strain theory (sociology), the theory that social structures may pressure citizens to commit crime
- Value-added theory, the assumption that certain conditions are needed for the development of a social movement

== See also ==
- General strain theory, a theory of criminology developed by Robert Agnew
- Role strain, a concept in role theory in sociology
