= John Strain (mathematician) =

American mathematician

John Andrew Strain is a Professor of Mathematics at the University of California, Berkeley. His areas of interest are Applied Mathematics, Algorithms, Numerical Analysis, and Materials Science. John Strain received his PhD in Mathematics from the University of California, Berkeley in 1988 working with his advisor Alexandre Joel Chorin. His dissertation paper was on the numerical study of dendritic solidification. Notable publications include Piecewise-polynomial discretization and Krylov-accelerated multigrid for elliptic interface problems, Locally corrected semi-Lagrangian methods for Stokes flow with moving elastic interfaces, Locally-corrected spectral methods and overdetermined elliptic systems, Fractional step methods for index-1 differential-algebraic equations, and Growth of the zeta function for a quadratic map and the dimension of the Julia set.
