= John Paul Strain =

American painter

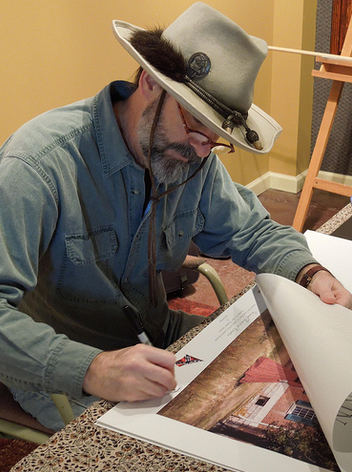
John Paul Strain signs one of his paintings in Franklin, TN.

John Paul Strain (born September 22, 1955) is an American artist specializing in art depicting American history. He creates hyper-realistic paintings of patriotic historical scenes, such as the American West, Civil War and D-Day, that are exhibited or used by institutions such as the US military, US Park Service and others. He has been described as inheriting the mantle of 19th-century print makers such as Currier & Ives and Louis Prang.

== Biography and career ==
For the first 15 years of his career he painted numerous original oil paintings of the American West. From the age of 21, Strain's paintings of landscapes, wild life paintings, and depictions of Indian life were represented by Trailside Galleries.

Strain began painting scenes from the American Civil War in 1991. These Civil War historical paintings are larger and have more detail than his western paintings. According to Strain, each painting is meticulously researched and painted with such detail (Strain often wears a jeweler's magnifying glass and uses a two to three haired brush to paint most of the composition's intricacies), that one painting may require more than three months to create.

Strain participates in Civil War reenactments. "I have been reenacting for many years. Currently, I am Captain of the 7th Texas Calvary. My unit has about 20 mounted cavalry men, and we participate in Civil War reenactments throughout the southwest. Working with men, horses, and equipment gives me insight into what life was like back in the 1860s. I know from experience how horse equipment should look when in use, or how a seasoned horseman carries himself in the saddle. I feel it really helps my art." -John Paul Strain.

Other historical paintings by John Paul Strain include Spirit of Discovery, a rendition of the Lewis and Clark expedition, as well as three World War II representations: Bastogne, Omaha Beach, and Utah Beach. More recently, Mr. Strain has composed three individual "Paintings of Paradise": Celarian Light House, Punta Sur Park Natural Reserve; Evening on the Plaza, Downtown San Miguel; and The Monument to Divers, Coast Road San Miguel. Inspired by his favorite vacation destination, Strain represents historical landmarks in the Caribbean island of Cozumel, Mexico.

== Awards, honors, holdings and exhibitions ==
Author John J. Dwyer said that Strain is, “Roundly regarded as one of the greatest painters, living or deceased, of American historical art."

Reproductions of Strain's paintings have won the PICA Awards (Printing Industry of the Carolinas). At the PIAG 2008 Awards in Georgia, Strain was awarded the 'Top Gold Award' for his painting New Year's Wish, and the 'Best of Category Giclée' for Fire In the Sky. Strain was awarded the Henry Timrod Southern Culture Award (2010) by the Military Order of the Stars and Bars for his contributions toward the understanding, appreciation and explanations of Southern Arts and Letters, as a member of the Order.

Strain has completed commissioned works for the United States Army, which are on permanent display at Fort Leavenworth, Kansas, Fort McNair in Washington D.C., and the battlefield visitor center at Normandy, France.

Strain's painting, D-Day, a 50th Anniversary portrayal of the first Infantry Division's landing on Omaha Beach in Normandy, France on June 6, 1994, was commissioned by the Class Gift Committee of the Command and General Staff College at Fort Leavenworth, Kansas in April 1994. The painting is now on display in the Eisenhower Hall of the CGSC, and was reproduced in an edition of 1290 prints for the 1994 graduates.

In April 2009, Strain was commissioned by the University of Alabama to paint a historical work for the Confederate Corps of Cadets assembling to fight the Union invaders in April 1865. The finished work was unveiled at the annual Gen. John C. Calhoun Sanders Lecture Series on the university campus.

On November 22, 1998, Strain appeared in an interview on C-SPAN's Washington Journal Feature, where he discussed his inspiration and techniques as a historical artist. On episode 18, season 5 of Extreme Home Makeover, Strain worked and painted on the set and donated a large original painting, 'Chatham House'. "Along with renowned artist John Paul Strain, Ty looks at a photo of the original Chatham house to make sure they've gotten the details right. 'I want it to look kind of mysterious,' Ty says. Ty and Strain, who completed his work in less than a week, secure the framed canvas—the molding was painted silver—with French cleats."

Strain's paintings have helped to raise funds for many historical restoration projects and battlefield preservation organizations. The National Park Service uses Strain's paintings in their publications and at battlefield sites.

== Books ==
Books by Strain

- Strain, John Paul. Witness to the Civil War: The Art of John Paul Strain. Courage Books, 2002. Print. ISBN 0762414014
- Strain, John Paul. The Historical Art of John Paul Strain. John Paul Strain Historical Art, 2010. Print. ISBN 061539308X

Books featuring art of Strain

- Beck, Brandon H. The Three Battles of Winchester: A History and Guided Tour. The Civil War Society Special Edition. Country Publishers, 1988. Print. (Cover)
- Bishop, Randy. Mississippi’s Civil War Battlefields: A Guide to their History and Preservation. Pelican Publishing, 2010. Print. (Cover)
- Bishop, Randy. Tennessee's Civil War Battlefields. Pelican Pub., 2010. Print. (Cover)
- Carter, Alden R. Bright Starry Banner: a Novel of the Civil War. Soho Press, 2005. Print. (Cover)
- Cozzens, Peter. The Battle of Stones River, Civil War series. Eastern National Park and Monument Assoc., 1995. Print. (Cover)
- Gorin, Betty J. Morgan is Coming!: Confederate Raiders in the Heartland of Kentucky. 3rd ed. Harmondy House Publishers, 2006. Print. (Cover)
- Matthews, Gary R. Basil Wilson Duke, CSA: The Right Man in the Right Place. 1st ed. The University Press of Kentucky, 2005. Print. (Cover)
- Mollring, Christine. The Artists of Trailside Galleries. Trailside Two Inc., 1980. Print.
- Phillips, David. Daring Raiders. 1st ed. Friedman/Fairfax Publishing, 1998. Print.
- Phillips, David. Maps of the Civil War. Barnes & Noble Publishing Inc., 2005. Print. (Cover)
- Ramage, James A. Rebel Raider: The Life of General John Hunt Morgan. The University Press of Kentucky, 1995. Print. (Cover)
- Robertson, William G. The Battle of Chickamauga, Civil War Series. Easter National, Ft. Washington, PA, 1995. Print. (p. 38)
- Samuels, Peggy, and Harold Samuels. Contemporary Western Artists. Bonanza Books, 1987. Print
- Sauers, Richard A. The Devastating Hand of War; Romney, West Virginia, During the Civil War. Gauley Mount Press, 2000. Print. (Cover)
- Seabrook, Lochlainn. Nathan Bedford Forrest: Southern Hero, American Patriot. 2nd ed. Sea Raven Press, 2009. Print. (Cover)
