= Doris Willens =

American journalist, lyricist (1924–2021)

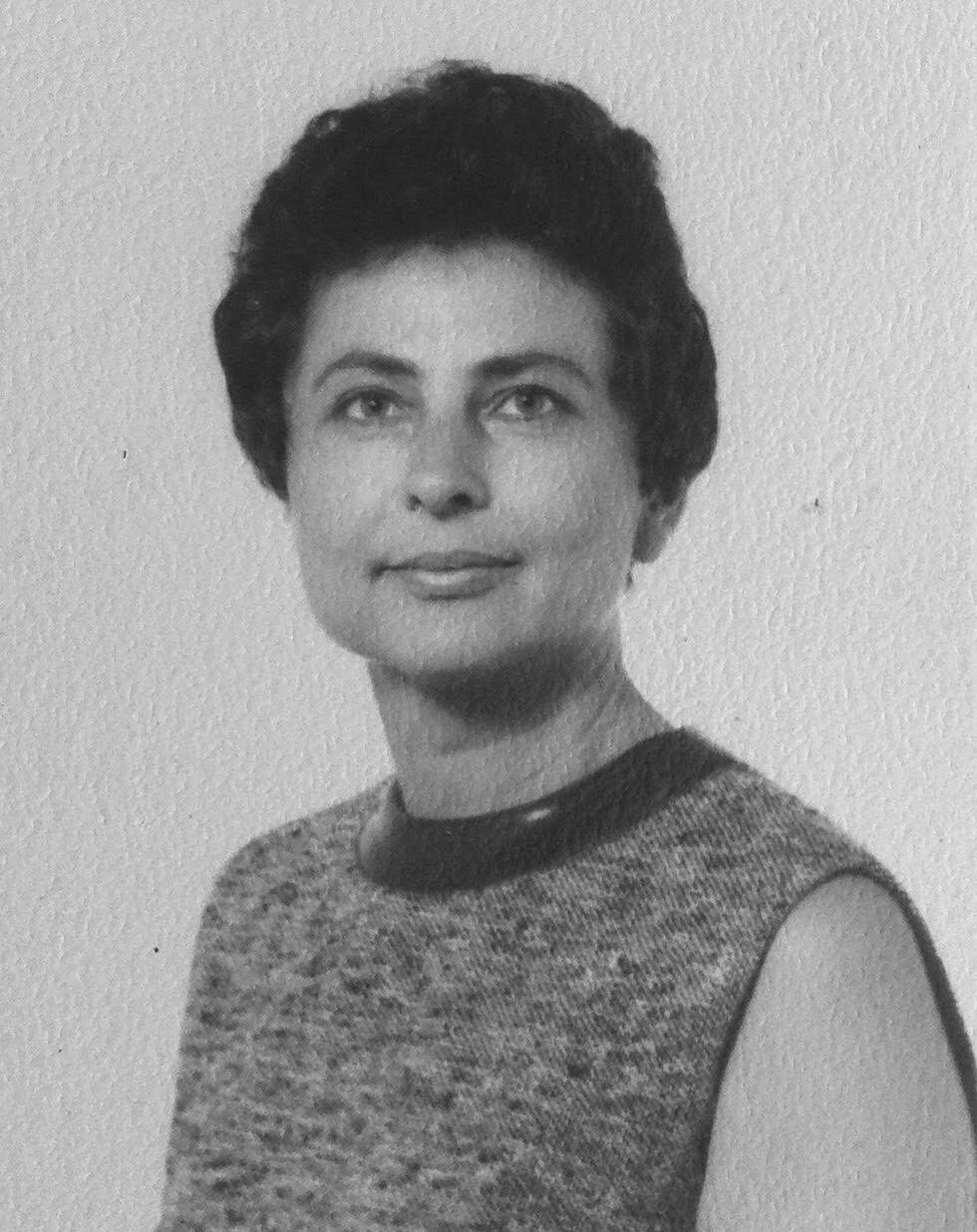
- Willens in the 1960s
- Born: August 15, 1924; New York City, U.S.
- Died: July 15, 2021 (aged 96); East Windsor Township, New Jersey, U.S.
- Other name: Doris Kaplan
- Occupations: Journalist; columnist; lyricist; advertising executive
- Notable work: Piano Bar (1978); Lonesome Traveler: The Life of Lee Hays (1988)
- Spouses: Bill Stout (m. 1947; div. 1948); Milton Kaplan (m. 1949; died 1972)

Doris Willens (August 15, 1924 – July 15, 2021) was an American singer-songwriter, journalist, advertising executive, and author. She was a member of the Baby Sitters, a children's folk music group along with Alan Arkin and Lee Hays, and she wrote Lonesome Traveler: The Life of Lee Hays (1988), describing his career with the Almanac Singers and the Weavers.

Willens worked for the New York Journal-American as a columnist covering Madison Avenue advertising agencies. For nearly two decades, she ran public relations for ad agency Doyle Dane Bernbach, ultimately serving as vice president. Later, she punctured the reputation of William Bernbach by writing about him from an insider's perspective. She wrote several musicals and plays including Piano Bar in 1978. Creating a theatrical group for seniors – Primrose Productions – Willens co-produced musicals in Long Island, New York, during the 1990s and 2000s.

Her older brother was wealthy political donor and Nuclear Freeze activist Harold Willens (1914–2003).

== Early life ==
Willens' Jewish family came from the north of Chernigov Governorate in the Russian Empire. Her mother was born Badana Heskin in 1895, and she married Samuel Wilensky (or Wolensky). Because of rising antisemitic violence, her father, and his younger brother Ben, traveled to the United States in July 1914 just as World War I was starting. The two men settled in The Bronx supported by the Lantzman community. Back in Chernigov, her mother raised a son, Harold. Mother and son barely escaped death in the 1919 Kiev pogrom, and in 1922 they paid a smuggler "mule" who was guiding a group of Jews out of Europe. The family reunited in The Bronx, where Doris was born in 1924. At the urging of her mother's brother to join him, the family moved to Boyle Heights, Los Angeles, in 1927. Her mother, known as "Bobbie", was a garment worker, and her father was a business agent for the International Ladies' Garment Workers' Union. Willens attended Manual Arts High School, then entered the University of California, Los Angeles (UCLA) where she earned a bachelor's degree in English. She was the chief editor of the Daily Bruin in 1944–1945 during her senior year, and her boyfriend, another English major, was future broadcaster Bill Stout. Willens returned to New York to enroll in the Columbia University Graduate School of Journalism, earning a scholarship in 1946 from the Woman's Press Club of New York City.

== Journalism and advertising ==
Willens was a newspaper reporter in Minnesota, hired in 1947 by the Minneapolis Tribune as the first woman to cover the police beat. She competed for scoops against 24-year-old Harry Reasoner, who worked for rival newspaper, The Minneapolis Times. Willens' beau from UCLA followed her to Minneapolis and began working at the Times; Willens and Stout were briefly married, from mid-1947 to mid-1948. When Willens appeared at the police station to cover the law enforcement news, the police detectives complained that they would have to clean up their language in front of a woman, but Captain Gene Bernath was supportive, accommodating Willens' schedule by holding news briefs in the afternoon. After her divorce, Willens started a romance with 28-year-old Milton L. Kaplan, assistant city editor at the Tribune.

In 1948, Kaplan accepted a position with William Randolph Hearst's International News Service in New York City. Willens married him in May 1949. In 1950, Kaplan was assigned the London office, bringing Willens to London for five years. Their son, Jeffrey, was born in London on May 5, 1954. Moving back to New York City, Kaplan rose through various executive positions in Hearst's organization, including a stint as Washington Bureau Chief, 1963–66. Returning once again to New York City, Kaplan's career culminated as chief of King Features Syndicate. At the close of 1972, he died of a heart attack at age 52 while skiing in the Catskill Mountains.

Willens was employed by the New York Journal-American and became the first woman columnist covering the advertising agency industry. In 1966 the ad agency Doyle Dane Bernbach (DDB) hired her as their director of public relations. In that role, she penned a wide variety of texts, including speeches for executives, company annual reports, and a musical salute for an internal party thrown every five years. She rose to the rank of vice president. Willens published the DDB News internally, conducting interviews and reporting on events. She was recognized in 1982 by the Academy of Women Leaders (AWL) for her "achievements... and contributions to the success of other women." The AWL is a program of the YWCA of the City of New York.

== The Baby Sitters ==
In 1955, Kaplan and Willens took a flat in Brooklyn. Willens discovered that folk singer Lee Hays lived one floor below them. Hays was struggling to get by because of the blacklisting of the Weavers, and he helped Willens soothe and entertain her baby son, Jeff with music Hays composed and words she wrote. From this kernel, Hays determined to form a group to make children's music, and he brought on board Alan Arkin, a young actor, and his nurse wife, Jeremy Yaffe. Yaffe and Willens both bore sons in 1956: Adam Arkin in August and Andrew "Pete" Kaplan in October. By 1958, the four adults had become the Baby Sitters, singing together and playing toy instruments. Arkin covered acoustic guitar, while Hays strummed the autoharp. The Baby Sitters produced two albums in 1959, with Willens credited as Doris Kaplan. Two more boys were born in 1960: Dan Kaplan on March 15 and Matthew Arkin on March 21.

Arkin and Yaffe divorced in 1961. The Baby Sitters reformed in 1964, with Arkin's second wife, Barbara Dana, replacing Yaffe. Their next album, The Baby Sitters' Family Album (1965), featured eight-year-old Adam on two songs. All five of the Arkin and Kaplan boys participated. This album was reviewed by Audio magazine, with praise for the casual context of the music, apparently recorded in the living room. The songs were complimented for being entertaining "without being patronizing." The reviewer remarked about how the guitar sounded "inept" at some points and "extremely expert" at others, with Willens' voice drifting off pitch, all of it perfectly appropriate and enjoyable. The group's final studio album was released in 1968. Vanguard Records compiled a 40-song greatest hits album, releasing it on two LPs in 1975, then again on CD in 1991.

== Theatre ==
Willens authored dramatic and musical pieces for the theatre. Piano Bar was workshopped in 1976, and enjoyed a brief run off-Broadway at the Westside Theatre in mid-1978. Musical director Joel Silberman also portrayed the titular piano player, while Tony Award–winner Kelly Bishop played a bar patron, along with Richard Ryder and others. Willens wrote lyrics for 21 songs, teaming with her friend Rob Fremont who wrote the music. Reviews were mixed to negative, with New Jersey drama critic Emory Lewis saying that the musical, with its "shallow" characters, was "in search of a plot." He said that Willens' lyrics rose above the "routine" music. Critic Rex Reed wrote that the production was "a distressing misfortune that left me speechless." Piano Bar played in Philadelphia, Syracuse and Japan. A 1980 Wilmington production was praised, but another the next year in Berkeley was panned. Willens herself was invited to attend the 1982 Pittsburgh production. The musical was mounted again in Chicago in 1992, using 19 of the songs.

Willens wrote song lyrics in 1990 for Aristophanes' play Lysistrata, collaborating with composer Laurence Dresner. In 1996 she wrote Disraeli, a one-man play about Benjamin Disraeli, performed in 1998 by William Lawrence, a 75-year-old actor. Willens partnered with Lois Stein to found Primrose Productions to produce plays around Long Island, New York, near Willens' home in Northport. The company name came from Disraeli's favorite flower, the primrose. The actors were mostly seniors, with younger ones in their 50s. Joined by Norman Ward as musical director, the company produced Spent: A Musical Revue About Growing Older in America in 1998, a Gilbert and Sullivan revue titled Great Books: A Musical Romp in 2000, and Monkey Business in 2002, written for a family audience. All of these titles were directed by Stein and written by Willens. In 2004, they produced Money: The Musical, and also a musical narrative titled Lonesome Traveler, telling the story of the Weavers and the Almanac Singers.

== Books ==
The long friendship between Willens and Hays inspired Hays to give her a collection of audio tapes that he had recorded of himself speaking about his life and experiences. Hays asked Willens to transcribe the tapes and write a book. He said, "I think the truth that I haven't faced is that I don't even want a book with my name on it published in my lifetime. I've been living a very private life... If a book came out with some of the things that would have to be discussed... I would be embarrassed and horrified." She dutifully transcribed the tapes but was daunted by the task of researching and writing a biography. Hays died in 1981, and many of his colleagues inquired of Willens about the book, expecting her to write it. She eventually realized that it was indeed her responsibility, and she researched Hays' life further, talking with friends, family and musicians to flesh out Hays' own words. The book, Lonesome Traveler: The Life of Lee Hays, was published in 1988 by W. W. Norton & Company.

From her vantage point as PR maven for DDB during 1966–1984, Willens wrote a biography about adman William Bernbach titled Nobody's Perfect: Bill Bernbach and the Golden Age of Advertising. Prior to publication, excerpts from the book appeared in the industry magazine Ad Age, stimulating controversy because Willens revealed Bernbach as less than the creative genius of his reputation. Ad Age editor Fred Danzig said that Willens' text was "more than accurate" in its portrayal. Willens published the book herself in 2009. Adweek reviewed the book positively, saying that Willens skewers Bernbach as a man who took credit for the work of others, but she also admits Bernbach's flair for finding the "big idea" in advertising, and his instinct for emerging marketing trends. Ad Age noted that Willens gave credit to Bernbach for being a dedicated family man rather than a womanizer, and for his professional skill at combining art and ad copy.

== Personal life ==
Willens was married for about a year to her UCLA boyfriend, William J. "Bill" Stout, ending in mid-1948. She married Milton L. Kaplan in May 1949, and the couple had three children: Jeffrey (1954), Andrew (later known as Pete, 1956), and Dan (1960). They lived mostly in New York City, with five years in London and three years in Washington, D.C., following Kaplan's career moves. In December 1972 Kaplan died. Willens did not remarry after this, but she had a longterm relationship with Leroy B. Block, an advertising executive. The two lived in Northport, New York, on the north side of Long Island. Block died in 2006.

Willens' older brother Harold was a captain in the marines, translating Japanese during the Occupation of Japan. He became a millionaire from real estate holdings on Wilshire Boulevard in Los Angeles, and he supported many progressive and liberal issues, especially focused on stopping the nuclear arms race. Harold was a leader of the Nuclear Freeze movement. He died in 2003.

Willens' son Andrew changed his name to Pete Kaplan; he is a financial advisor with Merrill Lynch in Charlotte, North Carolina. Her son Dan Kaplan trained as a classical guitarist in Seville, Spain, and specializes in folk music, especially Bob Dylan's early work. Willens' son Jeffrey Kaplan graduated Harvard Law School in 1980 to become an attorney in New York. He married Mary Shaw in 1983, divorcing in 1992. Jeffrey married Deb Sugarman, a drama teacher, in 2001. He was a partner in Chadbourne & Parke, then he co-founded Kaplan & Walker.

She died in East Windsor Township, New Jersey, in July 2021 at the age of 96.
