= Malibu Mafia =

Group of American Jewish political donors

The "Malibu Mafia" was an informal group of wealthy American Jewish men who donated money to liberal and progressive causes and politicians during 1960s–1990s. Associated with the beach city of Malibu, California, the group included economist Stanley Sheinbaum, Warner Bros. chairman Ted Ashley, television producer Norman Lear, and four businessmen: Harold Willens, Leopold Wyler, Miles L. Rubin and Max Palevsky. Founded in opposition to the Vietnam War, the group often met at Willens' beachfront house on Malibu Colony Road, and also in Sheinbaum's home in Westwood, Los Angeles, where he held a regular political salon with liberal participants, especially from the film and television industries of Greater Los Angeles. The Malibu Mafia were known for funding the failed George McGovern 1972 presidential campaign, the legal defense of Pentagon Papers whistleblower Daniel Ellsberg, the successful 1973 campaign by African-American politician Tom Bradley to become the mayor of Los Angeles, the 1978 salvaging of the progressive magazine The Nation, the Nuclear Freeze campaign of the 1980s, and the Israel–Palestine negotiations that yielded the Oslo Accords in 1993.

The first publication of the term "Malibu Mafia" was in Newsweek magazine in 1978: Sheinbaum was quoted complaining about the inexperience of Hamilton Jordan. The moniker was applied to the wealthy men by the media, not by themselves. Actors Paul Newman and Warren Beatty were associated peripherally with the Malibu Mafia, as was singer and Malibu resident Barbra Streisand. Television writer Albert "Al" Ruben (known for The Defenders and more) argued positions to the left of Sheinbaum.

The group was not always cohesive; they often acted individually and occasionally worked at cross purposes. The Malibu Mafia was the more liberal and idealistic challenger to the 1960s–1990s fundraising efforts of Jewish political donor Lew Wasserman, chairman of MCA, whose views have been characterized as centrist and pragmatic. In the late 1970s as the Malibu Mafia peaked, Jane Fonda and Tom Hayden headed an informal group of younger liberal donors and activists called "The Network". In the 1980s, Streisand joined with Fonda and other well-connected women to found the Hollywood Women's Political Committee, a nonprofit organization which funded many liberal causes.

== Causes ==
=== Daniel Ellsberg legal defense ===
Activist "Ping" Ferry called Sheinbaum to help gather funds for the legal defense of Daniel Ellsberg who had released the Pentagon Papers which demonstrated that the US government had lied about the expansion of the Vietnam War. Ellsberg was being tried for conspiracy, espionage, and theft of government property, and was facing a possible prison sentence of 115 years. Sheinbaum gave Ellsberg $900,000 over two years to help with his defense, which cost $50,000 to $70,000 per month. One of the fundraising parties was a private concert by Barbra Streisand at which more than $50,000 was raised. Accompanied by Marvin Hamlisch leading a piano trio, Streisand took song requests for $1,000 to $3,000 each.

=== George McGovern for president ===
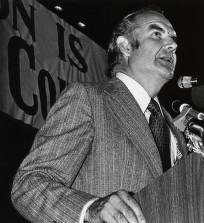
George McGovern ran in 1972 as the anti-war candidate

Palevsky gave $319,000 to Senator George McGovern in early 1972 when his campaign had run out of cash. Rubin gave $150,000 — his first political contribution. Subsequent campaign finance reforms put a stop to such large donations.

=== Tom Bradley for mayor ===
In 1973, the group backed Tom Bradley's second run for mayor of Los Angeles. Bradley had briefly led the 1969 contest against incumbent Sam Yorty, but Yorty regained momentum and won. During his term, Yorty was deeply distracted with his own ambitions to higher office, and Palevsky decided to back Bradley's second attempt. Palevsky headed a finance committee that was the largest donor to Bradley. (A young Gray Davis assisted Palevsky on the committee, and would himself see funding from Palevsky during his political career.) Bradley won the race to become the first African-American mayor of one of the most populated US cities.

=== Breakup of Big Oil ===
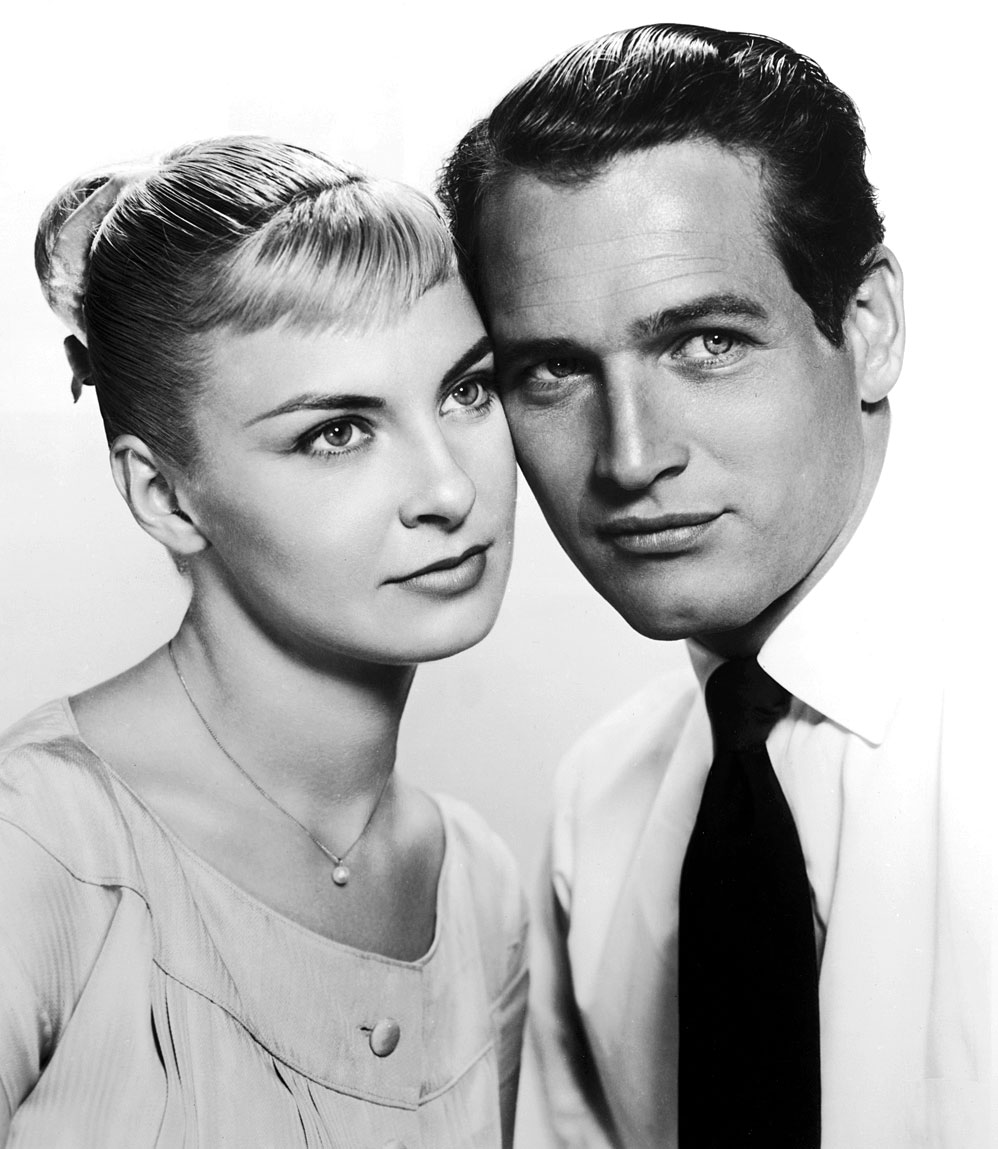
Joanne Woodward and Paul Newman spoke out against Big Oil

In 1975, five members of the Malibu Mafia (without Palevsky) met in Malibu to discuss the problems created by Big Oil. They determined to fight for more democratic control of United States energy policy. They formed the Energy Action Committee (EAC), initially funded with $500,000. Early in 1976, Paul Newman and his wife Joanne Woodward served as the voices of the EAC in Washington D.C. According to The New York Times, the EAC was formed "to prevent deregulation of natural gas prices and to propel through Congress legislation to break up the big oil companies into separate producing, refining and marketing entities."

=== The Nation magazine ===
In 1978, Sheinbaum and Lear led the Malibu Mafia in underwriting the struggling progressive magazine The Nation, organized under publisher Hamilton Fish as silent partners. Each donor promised $5,000 annually to keep the perennially unprofitable publication in print.

=== 1980 presidential election ===
In 1979 leading up to the 1980 United States presidential election, most of the Malibu Mafia opposed the re-election of President Jimmy Carter, and they formed Democrats for Change. The group initially preferred Ted Kennedy as the Democratic candidate. In 1980 when Republican John B. Anderson announced his independent bid, the group backed him; he strongly supported the Equal Rights Amendment. Lear was a prominent supporter of Anderson. Palevsky was not involved in this effort: he liked Carter.

=== People for the American Way ===
Lear headed the effort to found People for the American Way in 1980, for the purpose of opposing the Christian right. One of the group's successes was the 1987 opposition to Robert Bork as Reagan's Supreme Court nominee. Sheinbaum backed Lear in this effort.

=== Bilateral nuclear weapons freeze ===
In 1981, Willens pushed his colleagues to fund the bilateral nuclear freeze movement, to stop the proliferation of nuclear weapons in the United States and the Soviet Union. In 1982, the Willens-created group Californians for a Bilateral Nuclear Weapons Freeze put a nuclear freeze ballot initiative in front of California voters. The proposal was not asking for nuclear reduction or disarmament; rather, it suggested a stop to further expansion, with California to ask the federal government to "immediately halt the testing, production and further deployment of all nuclear weapons, missiles and delivery systems in a way that can be checked and verified by both sides." Paul Newman attracted publicity by announcing his support. Willens spoke before Congress on the topic of nuclear freeze, and named Leopold Wyler as a supporter, among others. By October, about $1.8 million had been spent on the campaign, with most of it from Willens. Willens later said that $4 million was raised in total. California voters passed Proposition 12 in November 1982, directing the state governor to request a nuclear freeze at the federal level. Governor Jerry Brown was unable to elicit a response from President Ronald Reagan, nor could Senator Alan Cranston. Willens eventually met personally with Reagan through his friendship with the president's rebellious daughter, Patti. At the White House, Reagan was dismissive, telling Willens that the Soviets were ahead in the nuclear arms race, that the United States should catch up before a freeze could be considered. Willens argued that the Soviets could be destroyed several times over by the current United States stockpile, but Reagan was not moved.

=== Israel–Palestine talks ===
Sheinbaum felt strongly that peace between Israel and Palestine could only be obtained by Israel yielding territory and autonomy to Palestine – a two-state solution. In 1987, Swedish Foreign Minister Sten Andersson spoke to Israeli representatives about a possible peace solution; he thought that the Palestine Liberation Organization (PLO) should discuss this same idea with American Jews before engaging in direct talks with Israel. Andersson contacted Sheinbaum, who assembled a small group of three other American Jews to meet in November 1988 in Sweden with four high-ranking PLO officials. After conferring with Colin Powell, Sheinbaum and five colleagues met directly with Yasser Arafat, Chairman of the PLO, in December in Sweden to determine what positions he held with regard to peace, and especially to find out whether Arafat would promise to stop supporting terrorism. With a positive result, Arafat spoke to the United Nations later in December, convened in Switzerland to allow him to attend, as George Shultz refused to issue him a visa to visit New York. This initiated a series of Israel–Palestine talks culminating in the Oslo Accords of 1993.

== Members ==
- Stanley Sheinbaum taught economics at Stanford University and Michigan State University, and he married Warner Bros. heiress Betty Warner in 1964. He engineered the release of imprisoned Greek leader Andreas Papandreou in 1967. He invested Betty's money and nearly doubled it in 1971 by correctly predicting that the US would abandon the Bretton Woods system gold standard. He ran a salon at his house in Westwood to discuss liberal causes. He put a very large stake in the Southern California chapter of the American Civil Liberties Union, and sat as chairman. While serving as a Regent of the University of California, he pushed for divestment from South Africa because of racist apartheid practices.
- Ted Ashley, born Theodore Assofsky in 1922, became head of Warner Bros. in 1970, and returned the company to profitability with the film Woodstock. Ashley was not impressed by McGovern's 1972 run for president, and instead donated $137,000 to Nixon.
- Norman Lear started writing for television in the 1950s. He began producing TV shows, and by the late 1960s he had also produced several films. Greater success came with 1971's All in the Family series followed by 1972's Sanford and Son. After working with the Malibu Mafia to back Democratic Party candidates, Lear greatly reduced his political activity in 1992.
- Max Palevsky designed computer components in the 1950s, then founded Scientific Data Systems in 1961. Xerox bought the company in 1969, providing $100 million to Palevsky, who invested in Intel. His first big political contribution was to McGovern in 1972. In the 1970s, Palevsky helped to found the Museum of Contemporary Art, Los Angeles, and he bankrolled the short-lived journal democracy in 1980, choosing Sheldon Wolin as editor. Palevsky raised funds in 2007 to help Barack Obama with the 2008 United States presidential election.
- Harold Willens was born in Ukraine, escaped death in the Kiev pogroms (1919), and in 1922 settled in the US when he was eight years old. He served in the United States Marines in the Pacific War, and was deeply moved by viewing the devastation of the atomic bombings of Hiroshima and Nagasaki. He became wealthy through real estate holdings on Wilshire Boulevard. He was the Malibu base of the Malibu Mafia; his two-story home on Malibu Beach was used for meetings. In 1968 he founded the Businessmen's Educational Fund to reduce the influence of the defense industry on government policy, to stop the nuclear arms race. Willens later conceived the Nuclear Freeze movement, and helped fund it. Willens was a Jewish atheist.
- Leopold "Leo" Wyler was the head of Tool Research and Engineering Corporation, making missile parts for the defense industry. In 1973 he partnered with ex-Rockwell Frank Jameson to form J-W Corporation for international trading. Jameson had recently become Eva Gabor's fifth husband. Wyler and Jameson hired Spiro Agnew as a consultant.
- Miles L. Rubin funded the development of a fuel cell for cars in the early 1970s, which did not yield practical results. He formed Reliance Manufacturing which made parachutes and ejection seats for the US military. The company Polo Ralph Lauren Jeanswear was founded by Rubin in 1990, and he sold it at a profit in 1997 to Jones Apparel. He formed the apparel company Sun/Greater Texas which sold for $150,000,000 in 1997. He formed Miles Electric Vehicles in 2004 so that he could help the environment. At Stanford Law School, Rubin established the Miles L. Rubin Public Interest Award, "awarded annually to an alumnus/a using law and/or advocacy in the public interest."
