= Stanley Sheinbaum =

American activist (1920–2016)

- Born: June 12, 1920; New York, New York, U.S.
- Died: September 12, 2016 (aged 96); Los Angeles, California, U.S.
- Education: Stanford University
- Occupations: Peace and human rights activist
- Spouse: Betty Warner
- Family: Harry Warner (father-in-law)

Stanley K. Sheinbaum (June 12, 1920 – September 12, 2016) was an American peace and human rights activist. One of the so-called Malibu Mafia, Sheinbaum joined with other wealthy Angelenos to fund liberal and progressive causes and politicians. He organized the legal defense of Daniel Ellsberg who had released the Pentagon Papers, and he initiated Israel–Palestine talks which eventually brought about the Oslo Accords of 1993.

== Early life ==
Sheinbaum was born on June 12, 1920, in New York City. His father was in the leather goods business. The family lost its money during the Great Depression. While in high school, Sheinbaum took a job after school as a sewing machine operator.

Sheinbaum was drafted into the army during World War II and assigned to making aviation maps. When discharged, he applied to 33 colleges on the GI Bill, but was rejected due to his poor grades. He returned to high school, and after graduating, was accepted at Oklahoma State University–Stillwater (Oklahoma A&M), where he excelled. After a year, he transferred to Stanford University and became an economics teacher. He subsequently accepted a position at Michigan State University teaching economics. While there, he became the administrator of a 54-person project named Michigan State University Vietnam Advisory Group (MSUG) which advised the unstable government of South Vietnam on how to prevent Communism. Sheinbaum eventually discovered that the university was providing cover for an ongoing Central Intelligence Agency operation. In 1959, he resigned from the project.

== Center for the Study of Democratic Institutions ==
After leaving Michigan State University, Sheinbaum moved to Santa Barbara, California, and became part of a think tank headed by educational philosopher Robert Hutchins called the "Center for the Study of Democratic Institutions". There he met and fell in love with Betty Warner, daughter of film mogul Harry Warner, who was also an activist. They married in 1964.

== MSUG project ==
While doing research into America's involvement in Southeast Asia, journalist Robert Scheer discovered the MSUG project. He found documents providing evidence that MSUG had been involved in the torture of Vietnamese nationals. Among the documents was a list of those involved with the project, including Sheinbaum, whom Scheer contacted. Appalled with the revelations, Sheinbaum went public with the information and became an active opponent of the Vietnam War. Because of his actions, he was dismissed from the think tank.

== Run for Congress ==
In 1966 and again in 1968, Sheinbaum ran for the United States Congress in Santa Barbara on a peace platform, but was unsuccessful both times.

== Daniel Ellsberg defense ==
In 1971, Sheinbaum was asked by activist "Ping" Ferry to help organize the Daniel Ellsberg Pentagon Papers defense team. He helped assemble the team of attorneys and became the main fundraiser and spokesperson, raising nearly one million dollars from over 25,000 contributors. He was joined in this effort by other wealthy Jewish men; later, the group became known as the Malibu Mafia.

== Arafat agreement ==
Along with the Palestinian Intifada, Sheinbaum assembled a team of Jews to meet with Yasir Arafat to persuade him to disavow terrorism and recognize Israel's right to exist. Anticipating that Arafat would question his credentials, Sheinbaum first held a meeting with then-National Security Advisor of the United States Colin Powell, explaining the situation. Five days later, Sheinbaum received a letter from President Ronald Reagan stating that if Arafat would fulfill his promises, the United States would "be responsive".

Sheinbaum presented the Reagan letter to Arafat during their initial meeting, and an agreement was reached. Arafat intended to discuss the agreement in front of the United Nations, but then-Secretary of State George Shultz rejected Arafat's visa request. In response, the entire UN Assembly flew to Geneva, where Arafat spoke, stating his intentions. The effort culminated in Yitzak Rabin and Arafat shaking hands at the White House in 1993 before President Clinton. Ultimately, Arafat did not fulfill his agreement, resulting in criticism of Sheinbaum.

== Rodney King beating ==
From 1991 to 1993, Sheinbaum served as President of the Los Angeles Board of Police Commissioners. He was highly critical of Chief Daryl Gates' response to the Rodney King beating. He believed the incident was not an isolated one, and led the effort, along with fellow commissioners, to force Gates from office.

== Recent times ==
Sheinbaum served on the American Civil Liberties Union (ACLU) National Advisory Council.

== Additional achievements ==
- Publisher of New Perspectives Quarterly
- Established the American Civil Liberties Foundation of Southern California
- Regent of the University of California (1977–1989)
- Helped found People for the American Way
- Modern art and craft collector (with his wife, Betty Sheinbaum)

== Death ==
Sheinbaum died at his home in Brentwood on September 12, 2016. He was 96.
