= Harold Willens =

American businessman (1914–2003)

- Born: 26 April 1914; Chernigov, Ukraine, Russian Empire
- Died: 17 March 2003 (aged 88) Los Angeles, California, U.S.
- Allegiance: United States
- Branch: United States Marine Corps
- Service years: 1942-1947
- Rank: Captain
- Conflicts: World War II: Occupation of Japan
- Education: University of California, Los Angeles
- Other work: Businessman, political activist

Harold Willens (April 26, 1914 – March 17, 2003) was a Ukraine-born American businessman and political activist. Known for his advocacy of a bilateral nuclear weapons freeze, he was associated with the so-called Malibu Mafia who donated to liberal and progressive causes and politicians. Willens provided the Malibu base of the group by hosting meetings at his house on Malibu Beach.

Willins co-founded the military reform Center for Defense Information in 1972. In 1978, he served on the United Nations Disarmament Commission. In 1982, Willens headed Proposition 12, a successful California ballot initiative calling for a bilateral nuclear weapons freeze between the US and the Soviet Union.

== Early life ==
Willens was born in the Chernigov region of the Russian Empire on April 26, 1914, the son of a tailor and a garment worker. He and his Jewish family barely escaped death in the Kiev pogroms (1919), and in 1922 they settled as refugees in the U.S., initially in the Bronx. His sister Doris Willens was born in 1924. The family moved to Boyle Heights, Los Angeles, in 1927. In 1932, Willens graduated from Roosevelt High School. He took a job at a food market to help support his family during the Great Depression. He started a food business with his wife Grace. Leaving much of the business to her, he enrolled in English literature classes at the University of California, Los Angeles (UCLA). Willens graduated from UCLA with Phi Beta Kappa honors in 1939.

== World War II ==
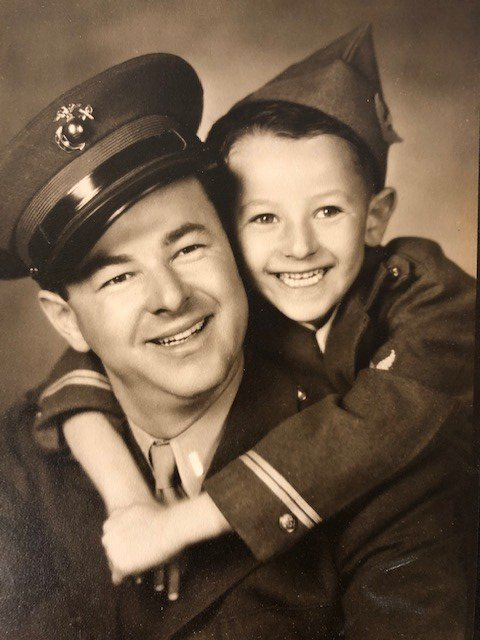
Willens and son Larry c. 1943

Willens volunteered to serve in the United States Marine Corps during World War II. He was taught to read, write and speak the Japanese language, and was sent to the Pacific War as a translator and interpreter. At the rank of captain, his service included a year in Japan during the occupation, interpreting for the local people and the occupying forces. He was shocked by the devastation of the atomic bombings of Hiroshima and Nagasaki.

While on occupation duty, Willens was approached by a Japanese man who asked him to locate and guard his family's heirloom samurai swords to preserve them from being destroyed – all Japanese weapons in the Kumamoto area had been confiscated by occupying forces to prevent armed violence. Willens eventually found the four swords in storage, and displayed them in his California home during the 1950s and 1960s, hanging on the wall of his den. At home in 1973, while preparing to visit China on business, he abruptly decided to stop in Japan to return the vintage swords to their rightful owner in Kumamoto. He inquired ahead to locate the owner, who was now 60 years old. Willens and his family were met at the airport with a television news crew who had learned of the repatriation of the katanas. Willens formally handed the ornate swords to their grateful Japanese owner on a morning television program. The occasion was heralded in Japan as a healing of the wounds of war.

== Business dealings ==
Willens bought two modest grocery stores on the outskirts of Wilshire Boulevard before he left for war. After he returned, the Wilshire business district expanded to include his properties, and he became a millionaire after a few years. He parlayed these holdings into a real estate fortune, including whole blocks of Wilshire commercial property. Willens also provided textile machinery to factories through his privately owned business, the Factory Equipment Supply Corp.

In 1989, Willens teamed with businessman Wesley Bilson to assist entrepreneurs in the newly opened Soviet Union. One of the projects was the transformation of a Leningrad military base into a factory making children's clothing. Raisa Gorbacheva was supportive of the mission. In Washington, D.C., California Representative Mel Levine spoke in favor, saying that such joint deals will help to "lessen the tensions that exist between our two countries."

== Political donations ==
In 1961, Willens was inspired to begin donating money to charitable causes, after listening to Aldous Huxley and other speakers at Hutchins Center for the Study of Democratic Institutions. He donated $50,000 in 1968 to help anti-war candidate Eugene McCarthy run for president, and he was able to convince ten other businessmen to do the same.

Willens was a central member of the casual group known as the Malibu Mafia. He helped fund the failed 1972 presidential campaign of George McGovern, who was running as the anti-war candidate, opposing the Vietnam War. Willens also served as a Democratic Party delegate from California at the 1972 Democratic National Convention in Miami Beach, Florida. In 1975, Willens urged his wealthy friends to form the Energy Action Committee (EAC), initially funded with $500,000 for the purpose of countering the political power of Big Oil. Willens hosted many political meetings at his Malibu home, including one attended by Paul Newman, Robert Redford, Neil Diamond and Warren Beatty.

== Nuclear weapons freeze ==
In 1968, Willens founded the Businessmen's Educational Fund to reduce the influence of the defense industry on government policy, to stop the nuclear arms race. Newspapers called him a "flaming moderate" for his relatively conservative style of progressive activism. In 1972, he co-founded the Center for Defense Information, a nonprofit group composed of retired military officers who aim for military reform.

Willens was convinced that Jimmy Carter would work to halt the arms race, and so he donated his time and money to Carter's campaign in the 1976 United States presidential election. Willens and Carter discussed nuclear weapons reductions at length; the two became close. After Carter won, Willens and Paul Newman were invited to dine at the White House where Carter "made certain commitments", according to Willens. Willens was appointed by Carter to the United Nations Disarmament Commission which met in New York in 1978. Willens felt betrayed when Carter declined to speak or even appear at the conference, undermining its purpose. After that, Willens abandoned Carter, saying "My candidate for president is the nuclear freeze." This catalyzed Willens to rethink the Nuclear Freeze movement as a citizens' effort. He joined in 1979 with Reverend George F. Regas and Rabbi Leonard Beerman to form the Interfaith Center to Reverse the Arms Race.

In 1981, Willens started a bilateral nuclear freeze movement in California, to stop the proliferation of nuclear weapons in the US and the USSR. In 1982, Willens created Californians for a Bilateral Nuclear Weapons Freeze to put a nuclear freeze ballot initiative in front of California voters. The proposal was not asking for nuclear reduction or disarmament; rather, it suggested a stop to further expansion, with California to ask the federal government to "immediately halt the testing, production and further deployment of all nuclear weapons, missiles and delivery systems in a way that can be checked and verified by both sides." Actor Paul Newman attracted publicity by announcing his support. In January 1982, Willens spoke before Congress on the topic of nuclear freeze. By October, about $1.8 million had been spent on the campaign, with most of it from Willens. Willens later said that $4 million was raised in total. California voters passed Proposition 12 in November 1982 with a 'yes' vote of 51 percent, directing Governor Jerry Brown to communicate to the federal government California's consensus against nuclear weapons increases. Brown was unable to elicit a response from President Ronald Reagan, nor was Senator Alan Cranston. Willens himself eventually met with Reagan through his daughter Michele's friendship with the president's rebellious daughter, Patti, who placed a call to her father and then handed the phone to Willens. At the White House, Reagan was dismissive, telling Willens that the Soviets were ahead in the nuclear arms race, that the US should catch up before a freeze could be considered. Willens argued that the Soviets could be destroyed several times over by the current US stockpile, but Reagan was not moved.

Willens published a book in 1984, The Trimtab Factor, which details how wealthy donors can stop the nuclear arms race. The name of the book comes from a mechanical trim tab on a boat or airplane, designed to make it easier to change direction while in motion. Willens picked up the concept from Buckminster Fuller.

Willens established a scholarly fellowship at The Nation magazine, called the Harold Willens Peace Fellow. Jonathan Schell was awarded the fellowship in 1998.

== Personal life ==
Willens lived in Santa Monica, California, during the 1960s, and was president of the Beverly Hills Tennis Club, organizing Pancho Segura Day in 1966 to raise money for the club's tennis pro. He moved to Malibu in the 1970s, to live on the beach in a two-story home in the affluent community known as "The Colony" on Malibu Point. He had two sons and one daughter: Larry, Ron and Michele. Later in life, he shifted between the Malibu house, a condo in Rancho Mirage where he played tennis with Spiro Agnew, and a third residence in Brentwood, Los Angeles.

He was a Jewish atheist. Regarding political contributions, he once said, "there is a widely held myth that... the potential contributor... has a certain number of dollars... and if someone else takes the dollars away, I won't get it... [A contribution] works just the opposite... it opens them up. It's a catalytic agent on the generosity, and then they tend to give more and more and more."

Willens died of heart failure at his home in Brentwood on March 17, 2003, at the age of 88.
