= Gilbert A. Harrison =

American magazine editor

- Born: May 18, 1915; Detroit, Michigan
- Died: January 3, 2008 (aged 92); Phoenix, Arizona

Gilbert Avery Harrison (May 18, 1915 – January 3, 2008) was the owner and editor of the influential American magazine The New Republic between 1953 and 1974. Harrison received a George Polk Award in 1964 for his work in revitalizing The New Republic.

During his tenure as the magazine's editor, The New York Times reported, "the magazine was a strong voice on behalf of the civil rights movement. After initially supporting the war in Vietnam, it became a forceful opponent of it, repeatedly criticizing Presidents Lyndon B. Johnson and Richard M. Nixon."

"In 1968, the magazine refused to endorse Hubert H. Humphrey, the eventual Democratic Party nominee, and proposed the creation of a new political party to be headed by Eugene J. McCarthy, the liberal senator from Minnesota who had unsuccessfully sought the presidential nomination," the New York Times further reported."

== Biography ==
He was born in Detroit, Michigan on May 18, 1915, one of three children of Samuel Harrison and Mabel Wolfe.

In 1937 he earned a bachelor's degree in psychology from the University of California, Los Angeles, where he had also been an editor of the university's newspaper, the Daily Bruin. He then worked at the University Religious Conference, which promoted inter-religious cooperation. In that position he met Eleanor Roosevelt, who recruited him as chairman of the youth division of the Office of Civilian Defense in Washington, D.C.

During World War II, he was in the Army Air Forces and served in the Philippines. In 1948, Harrison became national chairman of the American Veterans Committee.

Harrison married Anne Blaine, the granddaughter of Anita McCormick Blaine, in 1951. They had three sons, James, David and Joel, and one daughter, Eleanor.

He was the author of two books, “A Timeless Affair: The Life of Anita McCormick Blaine” (University of Chicago Press, 1979), a biography of his grandmother-in-law; and “The Enthusiast: A Life of Thornton Wilder” (Ticknor & Fields, 1983).

He lived in Scottsdale, Arizona. He died on January 3, 2008, in Phoenix, Arizona.
