= Adam Arkin =

American actor and director

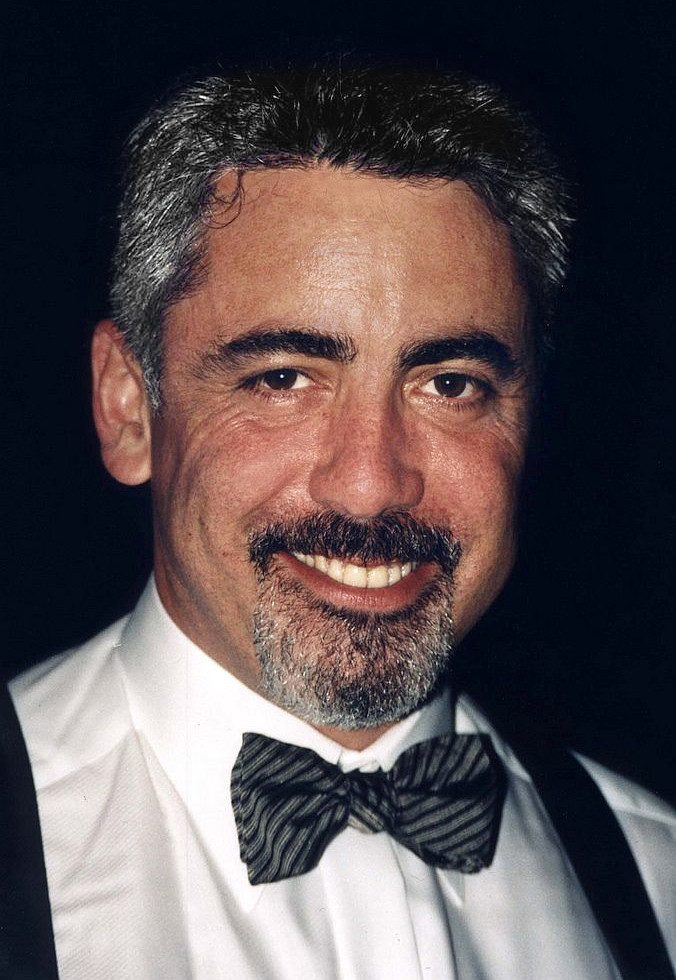
- Arkin in 1999
- Born: August 19, 1956 (age 70); New York City, U.S.
- Occupations: Actor; director
- Years active: 1969–present
- Spouses: Linda Arkin (divorced) Phyllis Lyons (m. 1999; div. 2013) Michelle Dunker (m. 2017)
- Children: 2
- Father: Alan Arkin
- Relatives: Matthew Arkin (brother); David I. Arkin (paternal grandfather)

Adam Arkin (born August 19, 1956) is an American actor and director. He is best known for playing the role of Aaron Shutt on Chicago Hope. He has been nominated for numerous awards, including a Tony (Best Actor, 1991, I Hate Hamlet) as well as three primetime Emmys, four SAG Awards (Ensemble, Chicago Hope), and a DGA Award (My Louisiana Sky). Between 2000-2002 he played the recurring role of Dr. Stanley Keyworth in The West Wing, most notably in Season 2, Episode 10, "Noel". In 2002, Arkin won a Daytime Emmy for Outstanding Directing in a Children's Special for My Louisiana Sky. He is also one of the three actors to portray Dale "The Whale" Biederbeck on Monk. Between 2007 and 2009, he starred in Life. Beginning in 1990, he had a recurring guest role on Northern Exposure playing the angry, paranoid Adam, for which he received an Emmy nomination. In 2009, he portrayed villain Ethan Zobelle, a white separatist gang leader, in Sons of Anarchy and Principal Ed Gibb in 8 Simple Rules (2003–2005). His brother Matthew is also an actor, as was his father, Alan Arkin.

== Early life ==
Arkin was born in Brooklyn to actor, director and writer Alan Arkin and his first wife Jeremy Yaffe. Arkin joined his parents singing in the children's music group the Baby Sitters, along with Lee Hays and Doris Willens. He graduated from Horace Greeley High School in Chappaqua, New York. Arkin is Jewish.

== Career ==
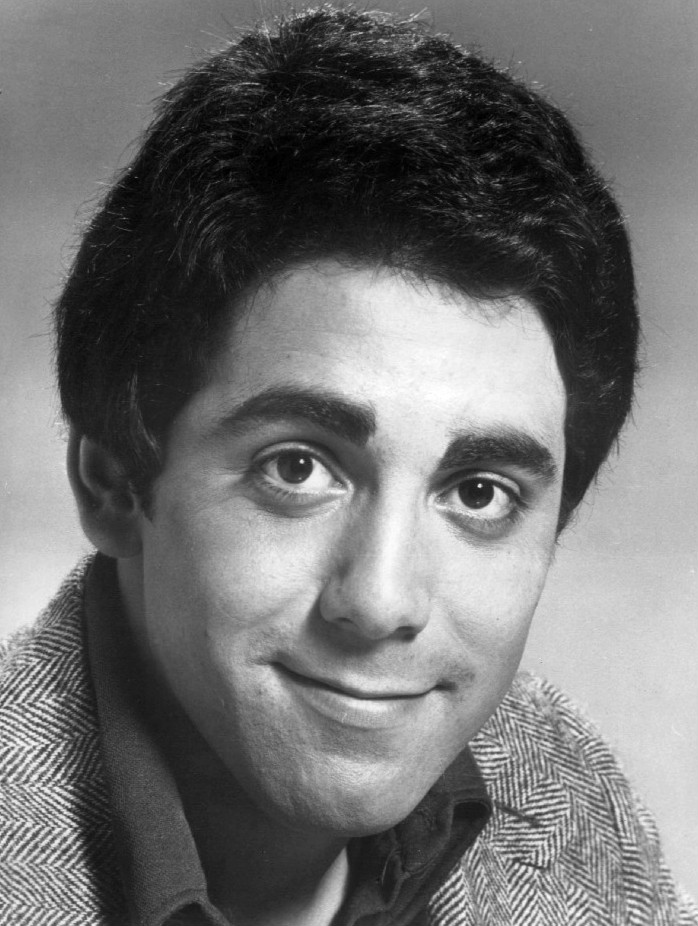
Arkin in 1976

In 1975, Arkin guest-starred in an episode of the award-winning television show Happy Days (season 2, episode 35), and an episode of Barney Miller ("Grand Hotel"). In 1977, he starred as Lenny Markowitz, the central character in the series Busting Loose. He has since appeared in numerous television series, including: A Year in the Life (1988); The Twilight Zone (1986); Northern Exposure (CBS, 1990–1995), in which he played the mercurial barefooted chef Adam; and Chicago Hope (CBS, 1994–2000); two Law & Order episodes (as jewelry store owner George Costas in "Self Defense," Season 3 in 1992, and as a district attorney named Charles Graham in "Red Ball," Season 16 in 2005); Picket Fences (Season 2, Episode 13); Frasier (as an obsessive fan of Frasier, for which he was nominated for a Primetime Emmy Award for Outstanding Guest Actor in a Comedy Series); Boston Legal; Baby Bob; Monk; and 8 Simple Rules for Dating My Teenage Daughter (2002). In 2007, he starred in the NBC drama Life in the role of Ted Earley. He played a white separatist leader named Ethan Zobelle during the second season of the series Sons of Anarchy. In April 2008, Arkin guest-starred in the web series Gorgeous Tiny Chicken Machine Show. In 2011, he appeared in a Season 7 episode of The Closer ("To Serve with Love"), and portrayed mob boss Theo Tonin on Justified as well as an FBI agent in The Chicago Code.

Arkin's film appearances include Halloween H20: 20 Years Later (1998) and Hitch (2005). He also played the part of a divorce lawyer in A Serious Man (2009), directed by Ethan and Joel Coen.

Arkin has also done voice acting. He played a minor role in the radio dramatization of Star Wars as the voice of Fixer. For PBS, he voiced Meriwether Lewis in Ken Burns's The Voyage of the Corps of Discovery (1997). He also provided character voice work for the Emmy-winning series The National Parks: America's Best Idea.

He has performed in Broadway, off-Broadway, and regional theatre productions, including Brooklyn Boy by playwright Donald Margulies in both its South Coast Repertory world premiere and the Broadway production).

In addition, he is known for his directing work, including episodes of Grey's Anatomy, Boston Legal, The Riches, Dirt, Ally McBeal, Sons of Anarchy, The Blacklist, Justified, and Masters of Sex. He won an Emmy for directing the Showtime television film My Louisiana Sky. He also directed three episodes of the 2013 Cold War television drama The Americans, the final episode of the second season (2014) of Masters of Sex, and the final two episodes of the critically acclaimed second season of Fargo (2015), in which he also had a minor role.

He is a co-executive producer of the television series Get Shorty.

== Personal life ==
He has a daughter, Molly, with his first wife, Linda. He was married to Phyllis Anne Lyons from 1999 to 2013, and they had one son together. Phyllis filed for divorce in August 2013. He married Michelle Dunker in 2017.

== Filmography ==
=== Film ===
| Year | Title | Role | Notes |
|---|---|---|---|
| 1969 | The Monitors | Boy in Monitors Commercial | |
| 1969 | People Soup | Adam | Short subject |
| 1971 | Made for Each Other | Teenage Guido "Gig" Panimba | |
| 1976 | Baby Blue Marine | Rupe | |
| 1981 | Under the Rainbow | Henry Hudson | |
| 1981 | Chu Chu and the Philly Flash | Charlie | |
| 1981 | Full Moon High | Tony Walker | |
| 1987 | Personal Foul | Jeremy | |
| 1991 | The Doctor | Dr. Eli Blumfield | |
| 1993 | Wrestling Ernest Hemingway | Bookstore Manager | Uncredited |
| 1998 | Halloween H20: 20 Years Later | Will Brennan | |
| 1998 | With Friends Like These... | Steve Hersh | |
| 1999 | Lake Placid | Kevin | Uncredited |
| 2000 | Dropping Out | Scott Kayle | |
| 2000 | Hanging Up | Joe Marks | |
| 2000 | East of A | Sylvester | |
| 2001 | Mission | Vissarion Belinsky | |
| 2002 | Stark Raving Mad | Don Partridge | Uncredited |
| 2005 | Marilyn Hotchkiss' Ballroom Dancing & Charm School | Gabe Difranco | |
| 2005 | Hitch | Max | |
| 2005 | Chloe | The Father | Short subject |
| 2005 | Kids in America | Ed Mumsford | |
| 2007 | Graduation | Dean Deeley | |
| 2009 | Just Peck | Michael Peck | |
| 2009 | A Serious Man | Don Milgram | |
| 2010 | Tell Tale | Husband | Short subject |
| 2010 | Summer Eleven | Ron | |
| 2012 | The Sessions | Josh | |
| 2013 | In Security | Broomhall | |
| 2014 | 10 Cent Pistol | Nir Zir | |
| 2021 | Pig | Darius | |

=== Television ===
| Year | Title | Director | Executive Producer | Notes |
|---|---|---|---|---|
| 2012–2014 | Justified | Yes | No | 5 episodes |
| 2015 | Fargo | Yes | No | 2 episodes |
| 2017–2019 | Get Shorty | Yes | Co-executive | 7 episodes |
| 2018 | Succession | Yes | No | 2 episodes |
| 2020 | Tommy | Yes | No | Episode "Packing Heat" |
| 2020 | Next | Yes | No | Episodes "File #7" and "File #10" |
| 2021 | Rebel | No | Yes | |
| 2022 | The Offer | Yes | No | 4 episodes |
| 2023–2026 | The Night Agent | Yes | No | 6 episodes |
| 2025 | Poker Face | Yes | Yes | 2 episodes |
| 2026 | American Hostage | Yes | No | 4 episodes |

==== Acting roles ====
| Year | Title | Role | Notes |
|---|---|---|---|
| 1975 | Happy Days | Bo | Episode: "Fonzie Joins the Band" |
| 1975 | We'll Get By | Richard | Episode: "Family Portrait" |
| 1975 | Barney Miller | Howard Smith | Episode: "Grand Hotel" |
| 1975 | Harry O | Eric Kershaw | Episode: "Portrait of a Murder" |
| 1975 | Hawaii Five-O | Alex Scofield | Episode: "A Touch of Guilt" |
| 1976 | Visions | Bernie Heller | Episode: "The Great Cherub Knitwear Strike" |
| 1977 | Busting Loose | Lenny Markowitz | 21 episodes |
| 1978 | The Love Boat | Alex Lambert | Episode: "Heads or Tails" |
| 1978 | Captain Kangaroo | Genie of the Banana | Episode: "10 January 1978" |
| 1978 | Pearl | Pvt. Billy Zylowski | 3 episodes |
| 1979 | $weepstake$ | Joey | Episode: "Lynn and Grover and Joey" |
| 1982 | Teachers Only | Michael Dreyfuss | 8 episodes |
| 1982 | The Love Boat | Jonathan Stevens | Episode: "Salvaged Romance" |
| 1985 | St. Elsewhere | Doug Zageck | Episode: "Fathers and Sons" |
| 1986–87 | L.A. Law | Richard Kendall | 2 episodes |
| 1986 | The Twilight Zone | Michael Wright | Episode: "A Matter of Minutes" |
| 1986 | All Is Forgiven | Phil Douglas | Episode: "Past Perfect" |
| 1986 | Tough Cookies | Danny Polchek | 6 episodes |
| 1986 | A Year in the Life | Jim Eisenberg | 3 episodes |
| 1987–88 | A Year in the Life | Jim Eisenberg | 22 episodes |
| 1989 | Hard Time on Planet Earth | Harry Newcomb | Episode: "Losing Control" |
| 1989 | MacGyver | Tony Parisio | Episode: "The Invisible Killer" |
| 1989–1990 | Knots Landing | Mark Baylor | 6 episodes |
| 1990–1995 | Northern Exposure | Adam | 10 episodes |
| 1991 | China Beach | Joe Arneburg | 3 episodes |
| 1991 | Nurses | Peter Teller | Episode: "Love, Death, and the Whole Damn Thing" |
| 1991 | The Hidden Room | | Episode: "Dream of the Wolf" |
| 1992 | Law & Order | George Costas | Episode: "Self Defense" |
| 1993 | Tribeca | Bob | Episode: "Stepping Back" |
| 1993 | Big Wave Dave's | Marshall Fisher | 6 episodes |
| 1994 | Picket Fences | Attorney Robert Biel | 2 episodes |
| 1994–2000 | Chicago Hope | Dr. Aaron Shutt | 138 episodes |
| 1996 | Picket Fences | Edward | Episode: "The Z Files" |
| 1997 | MADTv | Host | Episode: "2.19" |
| 1997 | Perversions of Science | Paul Danko | Episode: "Dream of Doom" |
| 2000–2002 | The West Wing | Dr. Stanley Keyworth | 4 episodes |
| 2001 | The Chris Isaak Show | Jimmy Vane | Episode: "Hurricane" |
| 2001 | Frasier | Tom | Episode: "The Two Hundredth" |
| 2002 | Monk | Dale 'The Whale' Biederbeck | Episode: "Mr. Monk Meets Dale the Whale" |
| 2002–2003 | Baby Bob | Walter Spencer | 14 episodes |
| 2003 | The Practice | Atty. Albert Ginsberg | Episode: "The Chosen" |
| 2004–2005 | 8 Simple Rules | Principal Ed Gibb | 12 episodes |
| 2005 | Law & Order | Charlie Graham | Episode: "Red Ball" |
| 2006 | Commander in Chief | Carl Brantley | 2 episodes |
| 2006 | Boston Legal | A.D.A. Douglas Kupfer | 3 episodes |
| 2007–2009 | Life | Ted Earley | 32 episodes |
| 2009 | Sons of Anarchy | Ethan Zobelle | 11 episodes (season 2) |
| 2011 | The Chicago Code | FBI Division Chief Cuyler | 2 episodes |
| 2011 | The Closer | Steven Hirschbaum | Episode: "To Serve with Love" |
| 2012 | The Newsroom | Adam Roth | Episode: "The Blackout, Part 2: Mock Debate" |
| 2012–2014 | Justified | Theo Tonin | 3 episodes |
| 2013 | Family Tools | Mr. Baynor | Episode: "Pilot" |
| 2014 | Masters of Sex | Shep Tally | 3 episodes |
| 2014 | The Bridge | Federal Investigator | 3 episodes |
| 2015 | State of Affairs | Victor Gantry | 6 episodes |
| 2015 | Fargo | Hamish Broker | 3 episodes |
| 2016 | How to Get Away with Murder | Wallace Mahoney | 4 episodes |
| 2016 | Modern Family | Reece | Episode: "Man Shouldn't Lie" |
| 2016 | The Carmichael Show | Grant | Episode: "Maxine's Dad" |
| 2019 | Santa Clarita Diet | Evan | Episode: "The Cult of Sheila" |
| 2019 | The Act | Detective | Episode: "Bonnie & Clyde" |
| 2020 | Law & Order: Special Victims Unit | Dr. Julius Adler | Season 21, Episode 8: "We Dream of Machine Elves" |
| 2021 | Rebel | Mark Duncan | Recurring role |
| 2021 | Big Shot | Tim | 3 episodes |
| 2022 | Benjamin Franklin | Elkanah Watson | Documentary; Voice |
| 2025 | The American Revolution | James Parker (publisher) (Voice) | TV Documentary |

TV movies

| Year | Title | Role |
|---|---|---|
| 1974 | Moe and Joe | Ralph |
| 1974 | It Couldn't Happen to a Nicer Guy | Ken Walters |
| 1975 | All Together Now | Jerry |
| 1979 | Tom Edison: The Boy Who Lit Up the World | Cole Bogardis |
| 1985 | The Fourth Wise Man | Joseph |
| 1988 | Necessary Parties | Mr. Dunfee |
| 1990 | Heat Wave | Art Berman |
| 1990 | Babies | David |
| 1990 | A Promise to Keep | Louis Colt |
| 1995 | In the Line of Duty: Hunt for Justice | Agent Gabriel Valentino |
| 1997 | Not in This Town | Brian Schnitzer |
| 1999 | A Slight Case of Murder | Detective Fred Stapelli |
| 2001 | Off Season | Richard Frangello |
| 2002 | Roughing It | Henry |
| 1998 | Thirst | Bob Miller |
| 2006 | Murder on Pleasant Drive | John David Smith |
| 2010 | Who Gets the Parents | Gene |
| 2011 | Smothered | Alan |

== Awards and nominations ==
| Year | Title | Award/Nomination |
|---|---|---|
| 1998 | Halloween H20: 20 Years Later | Nominated—Blockbuster Entertainment Award for Favorite Actor – Horror |
| 2009 | A Serious Man | Nominated—Boston Society of Film Critics Award for Best Cast |
| 1990–1995 | Northern Exposure | Viewers for Quality Television Award for Best Specialty Player; Nominated—Primetime Emmy Award for Outstanding Guest Actor in a Drama Series |
| 1994–2000 | Chicago Hope | Nominated—Primetime Emmy Award for Outstanding Supporting Actor in a Drama Series; Nominated—Screen Actors Guild Award for Outstanding Performance by an Ensemble in a Drama Series (1995–98) |
| 2001 | Frasier | Nominated—Primetime Emmy Award for Outstanding Guest Actor in a Comedy Series |
