= William E. Forbes =

William E. Forbes (May 30, 1906 – August 14, 1999) was a member of the Board of Regents of the University of California and owner of the Southern California Music Co. His tenure as regent coincided with the turbulent student protests of the 1960s.

Forbes was born in Anoka, Nebraska, and graduated from UCLA after serving as the first editor of the Daily Bruin.

He began his career with CBS radio in Hollywood, and in 1942, became executive assistant to CBS Chairman William S. Paley in New York City. He later worked for Young & Rubicam Inc. developing television commercials.

Forbes returned to Los Angeles in 1951 to assume control of the family business, the Southern California Music Co. He became active in the Downtown Businessmen's Assn. and the Better Business Bureau. He became president of the UCLA Alumni Association, and as such joined the Board of Regents in 1959. He was named to a full 16-year term on the board by Governor Edmund G. Brown in 1962.

During the free speech movement of the 1960s, Forbes chaired a committee to examine causes behind the student unrest and ways to address it. He was chosen UCLA alumnus of the year in 1967.

Forbes was on the board of the Norton Simon Museum between 1974 and 1979.

After the death of his first wife, Ann Fontron, Forbes married Madeleine Carpenter. He had two daughters, Julie Forbes Holmquist and Allison Forbes.
