= The Baby Sitters (folk group) =

American folk music group

The Baby Sitters was a music group that recorded four albums of children's folk songs from 1958 until 1968. Its original members were ex-Weaver Lee Hays as composer, Doris Willens Kaplan as lyricist, actor Alan Arkin on guitar, and his wife Jeremy Yaffe Arkin. In 1964, Jeremy was replaced by Barbara Dana, Arkin's second wife, and Arkin's eight-year-old son Adam was featured on a few songs. All of the Kaplan and Arkin boys participated.

For instruments, the group used a guitar, a toy piano, a toy xylophone, pots, pans, and jars.

== Discography ==
- Folk Songs For Babies, Small Children, Parents And Baby Sitters (1959)
- Songs and Fun with the Baby Sitters (1959)
- The Baby Sitters' Family Album (1965)
- The Baby Sitters' Menagerie (1968)
- The Best of the Baby Sitters (compilation, on Vanguard 1975 and 1991)
