= Bill Stout =

American journalist (1927–1989)

- Born: William Job Stout; September 4, 1927; Chicago, Illinois, U.S.
- Died: December 1, 1989 (aged 62); Los Angeles, California, U.S.
- Resting place: Forest Lawn Memorial Park
- Education: University of California, Los Angeles

William Job Stout (September 4, 1927 – December 1, 1989) was an American journalist and occasional actor, known for his radio and television broadcasting career with CBS News.

== Early life and education ==
Stout was born William Job Stout in Chicago, Illinois on September 4, 1927. He attended the University of California, Los Angeles (UCLA), majoring in English. He enrolled when he was 16, and started classes as he turned 17. During his first year, he was a reporter for the Daily Bruin when Doris Willens was senior editor; Stout and Willens dated romantically. After Willens left for graduate studies in New York, Stout advanced to editor and was active politically, advocating other students to join the picket lines at Warner Bros. following Hollywood Black Friday in October 1945. Stout was questioned the next month by a state legislature investigative committee led by Assemblyman C. Don Field, with Stout responding that he was not a member of the proto-communist American Youth for Democracy, though he had been connected with the group a year earlier for a few months. He said that film publicist Jack Daley invited him to join the strikers at Warner Bros. on October 20.

Stout advocated racial justice in a college newspaper editorial, and, in 1946, he represented UCLA in Prague at the founding meeting of the International Union of Students.

== Career ==
=== Newspaper ===
Stout left UCLA in June 1947 at the age of 19 and joined Willens in Minneapolis where she was now a reporter for the Minneapolis Tribune. Stout obtained work at the rival paper, The Minneapolis Times, alongside freshman reporter Harry Reasoner who would later attain fame as a television commentator. Stout and Willens married in mid-1947 but they divorced a year later. Stout continued at the Times, later shifting to work for the Associated Press news agency. He married Helen Larson in 1949 and they moved to Los Angeles in 1950 with her son Craig, who he later adopted.

=== Broadcasting ===
Stout's first broadcast journalist work was for CBS-owned KNX (AM) radio in Los Angeles, working as a reporter starting in 1950. In 1953, he moved to the affiliated television station KNXT, taking the roles of reporter, researcher and writer. KNXT broadcast on channel 2, and Stout worked for the channel's investigative news show Special Assignment. (In 1984, KNXT changed to KCBS-TV.) Stout interviewed Richard Feynman in 1959 for KNXT; the conversation, with its questions about the intersection of science, religion and society, is preserved as a chapter in Feynman's book, Perfectly Reasonable Deviations From The Beaten Track.

In 1960, Stout left CBS for three years to work for rival KTLA inside an old Warner Bros. sound stage, under the same roof as Paramount Pictures. Stout moderated Richard Nixon's press conference following his defeat in the California governor's race in 1962. Stout hosted a half-hour TV series, Line of Sight, in which he aired his commentaries on current news topics. The series was produced by Irwin Rosten at KTLA for Paramount.

In 1963, Stout returned to CBS as the Los Angeles correspondent of CBS News. The Los Angeles Times later observed that Stout's changes of employment during his early years were probably due to the argumentative attitude he displayed to his superiors and peers. He wrote occasional newspaper articles, and he was a popular speaker at parties and fundraisers.

In 1972, he rejoined Channel 2 KNXT. In 1978 on his Perspectives segment, he began delivering gruff commentaries with a rumpled, balding appearance akin to actor Ed Asner portraying Lou Grant. Stout was dismissive of newscasters chosen for their attractive appearance. At KNXT, he was known as a highly regarded investigative reporter and political commentator who preferred to ignore partisan ideologies and divisions.

In 1978, Stout unwittingly contributed to the loss by Mervyn Dymally to Mike Curb in the race for Lieutenant Governor of California. A week before the election, Stout announced on the radio that Dymally was soon to be indicted for an unspecified crime. He said, "I have read it. You have heard it. Dymally knows it." Dymally had been leading by six points in polls, but this unanswerable accusation ruined his chances. The rumor was later traced to Bob Fairbanks, a political reporter from the Los Angeles Times who was hostile to Dymally. Fairbanks had inquired of the California Attorney General's office about a rumored indictment of Dymally, and the deputy attorney general Michael Franchetti wrote a memo about the rumor inquiry. A version of the memo with the rumor part erased was given to Curb's office where Stout's wife Margaret worked. Margaret passed the memo to Stout and he read it aloud on the radio as if it were fact. Dymally heard the broadcast and immediately ceased campaigning, knowing his bid was shattered.

As part of his commentary at KNXT, Stout regularly chose a person or entity as the winner of his "Golden Turkey of the Month." One of these was Judith Belushi, widow of TV-movie comic John Belushi; the subject was the 1984 biography Wired: The Short Life and Fast Times of John Belushi by Bob Woodward. Judith Belushi complained that Woodward's book was unfair in that it did not say that "drugs can be fun". Contrasting that sentiment with John Belushi's death by drug overdose, Stout awarded Judith the Golden Turkey, saying her comment was "an all-time low in widows' tributes".

On February 3, 1988, Stout received a star on the Hollywood Walk of Fame for his work in the television industry. In a ceremony conducted at the star's location (1500 Vine Street.), Police Chief Daryl Gates said that Stout was "one of the few remaining real reporters in the city".

== Death ==
In 1987, Stout survived a serious heart attack. He spent six months off the air in recovery.

Stout's final television appearance was November 28, 1989, on KCBS's Action News at 6. Two nights later, Stout was admitted to Cedars-Sinai Medical Center in Los Angeles, with flu-like symptoms. He died the next morning from cardiac arrest at the age of 62. Stout was survived by his wife, Margaret, her five children and three children from his second marriage. He was briefly married to a fellow UCLA student.

He is interred at Forest Lawn Memorial Park in the Hollywood Hills of Los Angeles.

== Filmography ==
| Year | Title | Role | Notes |
|---|---|---|---|
| 1958 | I Want to Live! | Bill Stout - TV Newsman | Uncredited |
| 1963 | The Ugly American | Tyler, NBC Reporter | |
| 1964 | The Best Man | Himself | |
| 1972 | The Candidate | Himself (CBS) | |
| 1973 | Sunshine | Interviewer | |
| 1974 | The Phantom of Hollywood | Commentator | |
| 1974 | The Underground Man | Television newscaster | |
| 1979 | 11th Victim | Reporter | |
