= Associated Students of the University of California, Los Angeles =

Student association of UCLA

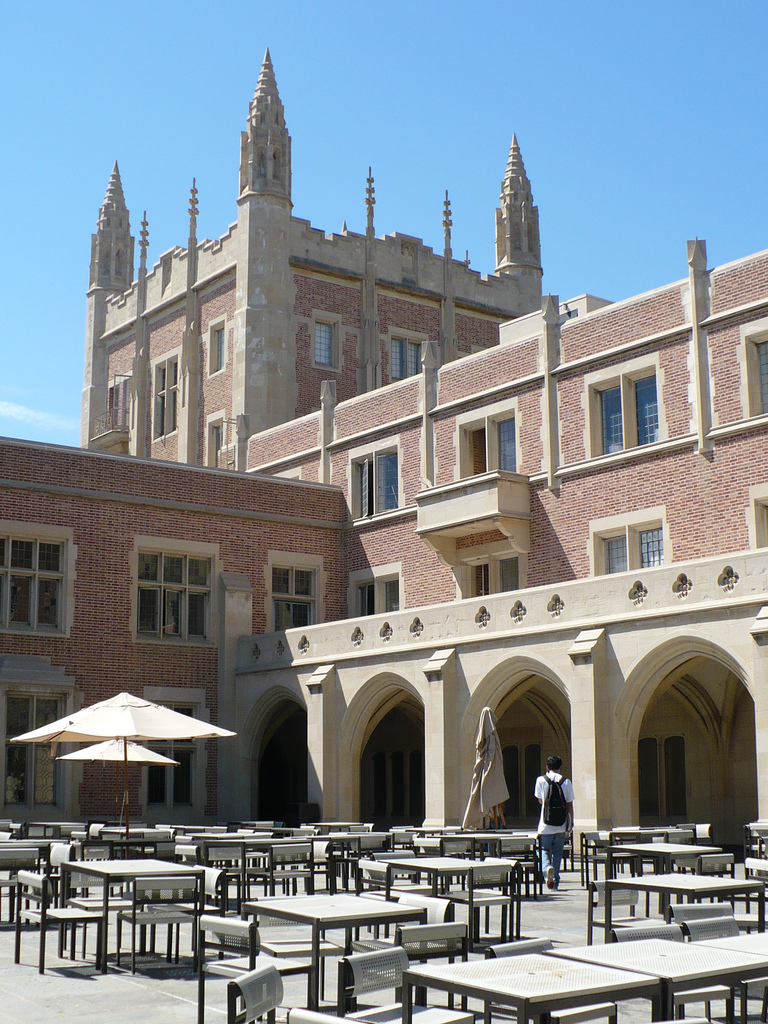
- Kerckhoff Hall, home to ASUCLA and the Daily Bruin
- Abbreviation: ASUCLA
- Nickname: Associated Students UCLA
- Formation: 1919
- Type: Unincorporated association
- Tax ID no.: 95-1777979
- Legal status: 501(c)(3)
- Headquarters: 308 Westwood Plaza, Los Angeles, California 90024
- Location: UCLA
- Services: Advocacy; Funding; Media/Publications; Student union complex; Restaurants; Catering; Event management
- Subsidiaries: Undergraduate Students Association; Graduate Students Association; Various media and publications including the Daily Bruin
- Budget: $80M+ (FY18)
- Revenue: $77,711,919 (FY17)
- Expenses: $77,335,901 (FY17)
- Staff: 2,568 (2016)
- Volunteers: ~960 (~2016)
- Website: asucla.ucla.edu

The Associated Students of the University of California, Los Angeles, also known as the Associated Students UCLA or ASUCLA, is the students' association of the University of California, Los Angeles. It was founded in 1919, the same year UCLA was established.

ASUCLA has four major divisions: The Undergraduate Students Association, the Graduate Students Association, Student Media, and Services & Enterprises. These first three divisions are generally managed by their own internal bodies (primarily the Undergraduate Students Association Council, the Graduate Students Association's Forum, and the ASUCLA Communications Board), while the Services & Enterprises division is directly governed by the ASUCLA Board of Directors (which delegates day-to-day management of the division to the association's executive director and other professional staff).

== History ==
In 1919, the California State Legislature converted the Vermont Avenue Normal School Teacher’s College in downtown Los Angeles into the University of California, Southern Branch, and the modern ASUCLA was formed that same year. At that time, the University Regents considered the university's role to simply manage its academics, libraries, and faculty. As a result, ASUCLA provided numerous services, including athletics, housing, and, parking.

After the school moved to Westwood in 1929, Kerkhoff Hall was one of the first buildings constructed on the new campus. The building was dedicated on January 20, 1931, when ASUCLA started operating the building.

In the 1930s, the association underwent significant financial difficulties due to the Great Depression and declining football revenues at the time, as at the time ASUCLA controlled campus athletics. In response, ASUCLA General Manager William Ackerman approached the University Regents about receiving a loan. In 1933, the Regents approved a $50,000 loan, but with the condition that a barely-student majority board of control (later renamed the Board of Directors) be established to control the association's finances. This represented a significant loss of control for the organization, which until then had operated with significant autonomy from the university administration. However, the association was forced to accept the terms of the loan in order to avoid bankruptcy.

The Graduate Students Association was recognized in 1950, and in 1953, Undergraduate Students Association's Student Executive Council was renamed as the Student Legislative Council. During this time ASUCLA helped to address some of the growing pains on campus including issues with the availability of on campus food and agreeing to fee increases to fund the future expansion of a new student union building.

In 1960, the university took away control of athletics and parking from ASUCLA, both of which the association had run until then. That same year, the student body approved a 40 year student fee increase to finance a new $5.5 million student union building as the existing Kerckhoff Hall had become inadequate to accommodate the much larger student population. On April 3, 1961, Ackerman Union opened adjacent to Kerckhoff Hall.

For much of its history through the 1964-1965 school year, most of the members of Undergraduate Students Association's Student Legislative Council Student Executive Council represented constituencies such as academic groupings, gender, class (i.e. freshman, sophomore, etc.), and lower/upper division status, various boards, or even the graduate student body. However, that year the system was changed so that all Student Legislative Council members represented the entire undergraduate student body, with the new system taking effect the following academic year.

1974 Statement of Understanding between ASUCLA and UCLA

In 1972, the University Regents adopted a policy declaring that the Associated Students organizations of the various University of California campuses were subsidiaries of the university. Regardless of the legality of the university's unilateral declaration, in June 1974 ASUCLA signed a memorandum of understanding with the university stating "Although the association is subject to all applicable regents and university policies, it is understood that the Associated Students UCLA has maximum feasible operating and decision making;" according to the contemporaneous ASUCLA executive director, the MOU weakened the association's independence and autonomy.

In 1982, the Undergraduate Students Association's Student Legislative Council was renamed as the Undergraduate Students Association Council. In the 1980s, the organization was involved in a series of disputes reflecting the racial tensions on the UCLA campus.

During the 1980s, the association was financially successful. However, by the mid-1990s, ASUCLA had entered a financial crisis in part due to the costs of maintaining its infrastructure including the student union buildings. The Board responded by firing the executive director for financial mismanagement and hiring a turnaround firm. In 1996, due to financial issues and a failed student fee referendum, ASUCLA secured a $20 million loan from the University on the condition it prepare a five-year forecast with its annual budgets and prohibit presidents of the undergraduate students association and the graduate students association from serving on the board; the loan specified that a failure to do so would entitle the UCLA Chancellor to appoint additional representatives of the campus administration to the Board and eliminate the student-majority. The Board also responded to the mid-90's financial crisis by delegating additional responsibilities to the association's professional staff.

== Board of directors ==
The board of directors is composed of students (appointed by the undergraduate and graduate student associations), UCLA administrators (appointed by the campus chancellor), a faculty member (appointed by the Academic Senate), and alumni (Note: The alumni association appoints only one regular board member (along with an alternate).) (appointed by the alumni association board of directors), with the student members constituting a bare majority. In addition, the ASUCLA's executive director serves as an ex-officio, non-voting board member. Under the bylaws, the positions of chair and vice chair rotate approximately every six months between an undergraduate board member and a graduate board member, while the position of secretary is held by a non-student board member for a year-long term.

== Undergraduate Students Association ==
=== Council ===
The Undergraduate Students Association Council (USAC) is composed of fifteen officials directly elected every spring quarter - President, Internal Vice President, External Vice President, three General Representatives, Academic Affairs Commissioner, Campus Events Commissioner, Community Service Commissioner, Cultural Affairs Commissioner, Facilities Commissioner, Financial Supports Commissioner, Student Wellness Commissioner, Transfer Student Representative, and International Student Representative. All of these officials are elected using ranked choice voting, with the three General Representatives specifically being elected using the single transferable vote method.

=== Elections Board ===
The Elections Board is responsible for administering all Undergraduate Students Association elections, including validating petition signatures, as well as recommending changes to the Undergraduate Students Association elections code. The Chair of the Elections Board is nominated by the Undergraduate Students Association President and approved by the Council. The other members of the Elections Board are nominated by its Chair and approved by the Council.

=== Judicial Board ===
The Judicial Board serves two primary functions: First, it rules on whether policies and actions comply with the Undergraduate Students Association's governing documents, including issuing advisory opinions. Second, it hears appeals of decisions by the Undergraduate Students Association's Elections Board. In addition, the Board is authorized under the Undergraduate Students Association Constitution to exercise any functions delegated to it by the UCLA Chancellor.

The Judicial Board is composed of seven undergraduate members, who are nominated by the Undergraduate Students Association President and confirmed by a 2/3 vote of the Council. Members hold their office for the remainder of their undergraduate tenure at UCLA or until they have held the position for two years. However, they can also be removed for cause by a three-quarters vote of the Council.

The Council may overrule a decision of the Judicial Board by a three-quarters vote.

== Graduate Students Association ==
=== Councils ===
The GSA includes 13 councils organized around related academic groupings. The councils are in charge of representing their student-constituents' interests to other GSA bodies, electing representatives to other GSA bodies (including Forum delegates), and spending programming funds allocated to them. Each council is composed of one representative for every ten students (or fraction thereof) in an academic department, with reappointment occurring every summer. As of fall 2016, the councils and their respective constituencies are:

=== Forum ===
The Forum is highest-ranking body of GSA. Three regular meetings occur during each of the fall, spring, and winter quarters, (Note: The GSA Constitution mandates a minimum of two regular meetings per quarter, while the GSA Codes specify three regular meetings each quarter.) with meetings scheduled and chaired by the GSA Vice President of Internal Affairs.

Each GSA council elects one delegate for every 600 students (or fraction thereof) that it represents. Additionally, the Student Interest Board (collectively representing the Black Graduate Students Association, International Graduate Students Association, Armenian Graduate Student Association, Chinese Students and Scholars Association, Hispanic/Latinx Graduate Students Association, and First-Generation Graduate Students Council) selects two delegates. Finally, the four GSA officers and other cabinet members serve as ex-officio, nonvoting members (with the GSA officers prohibited from serving as Forum delegates).

=== Cabinet ===
The Cabinet is charged with "oversee[ing] the daily operations of the GSA." It comprises four officers who are directly elected every spring quarter - the President, Vice President of Internal Affairs, Vice President of External Affairs, and Vice President of Academic Affairs.

== Student media ==
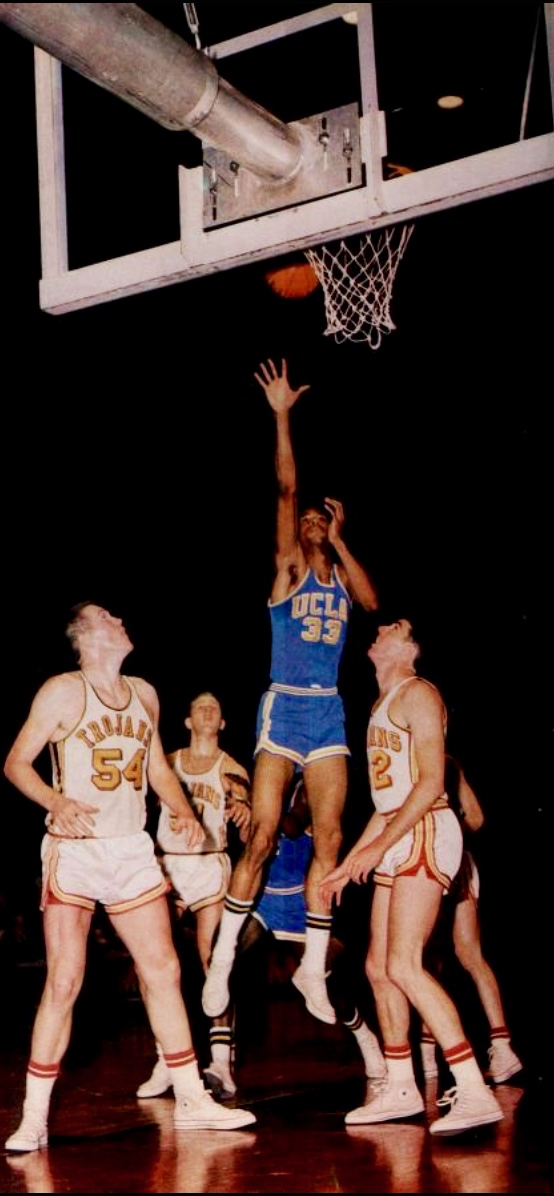
1967 photo of then student Kareem Abdul-Jabbar taken by the students of UCLA

ASUCLA publishes ten media publications as well as a reviews website by the student newspaper:

- The UCLA Daily Bruin (operating as the Daily Bruin), a daily (i.e. Monday-Friday) newspaper founded in 1919
  - Bruinwalk, a website founded in 1998, run by the Daily Bruin, and featuring services such as reviews of UCLA professors and apartments near the UCLA campus; differing services have been provided throughout its history.
- UCLA Radio, a radio station founded in 1963
- Nomno (operating as Nommo Newsmagazine), a founded in 1969 and "devoted to issues relevant to the Black community"
- La Gente de Aztlan (operating as La Gente Newsmagazine), founded in 1971 and "devoted to issues relevant to the Chicano community"
- Ha'Am, founded and "devoted to issues relevant to the Jewish community"
- Fem, founded in 1973 and "devoted to issues relevant to women"
- Pacific Ties, founded in 1977 and "devoted to issues relevant to the Asian American community"
- BruinLife, an annual yearbook founded in 1919
- OutWrite, founded in 1979 as TenPercent (renamed in 2005) and "devoted to issues relevant to the Gay and Lesbian community" (but serving the broader queer community)
- Al-Talib, founded in 1990 and "devoted to issues relevant to the Muslim community"

=== ASUCLA Communications Board ===
The Communications Board is composed of eight students (four each appointed by the undergraduate and graduate students associations), a UCLA administrator (appointed by the campus chancellor), a faculty member (appointed by the Academic Senate), an alumnus (appointed by the Executive Director of the UCLA Alumni Association), and four media professionals (appointed by the Communications Board on the recommendation of its operations committee), with the student members constituting a bare-majority. In addition, the ASUCLA Media Director serves as an ex-offico, non-voting board member, but is treated like a voting board member for the purposes of calling meetings and constituting quorum.

=== Daily Bruin ===
The UCLA Daily Bruin (operating as the Daily Bruin) is UCLA's campus newspaper and was founded in 1919. Until the COVID-19 pandemic, the paper published a physical paper every school day, which it has done since the mid-1920s, making it the only student newspaper within the University of California system to still published a physical paper five days a week. According to the newspaper's website as of December 2021, about 9,000 physical papers are distributed every weekday and about 500 students work in the editorial operations of the paper.

== Services and enterprises ==
Unlike the other divisions of ASUCLA, the Services & Enterprises division is directly governed by the ASUCLA Board of Directors (which delegates day-to-day management of the division to the association's executive director and other professional staff).

ASUCLA's restaurants are not limited to areas in or around the student union complex it operates.

=== UCLA trademarks ===
ASUCLA licenses the UCLA brand name to other parties.

== See also ==
- University of California, Los Angeles
- Associated Students of the University of California, the student association of UC Berkeley
- Associated Students of the University of California, Santa Barbara, the undergraduate student association of UC Santa Barbara
- University of California Student Association, the systemwide student association of the University of California
- Student governments in the United States
