= Daily Bruin =

Student newspaper of UCLA

- Type: Student newspaper
- Format: Broadsheet
- Owner: Associated Students of the University of California, Los Angeles
- Editor-in-chief: Alexandra Crosnoe
- Founded: 1919
- Headquarters: 118 Kerckhoff Hall; 308 Westwood Plaza; Los Angeles, California 90095
- Circulation: 6,000
- Website: dailybruin.com
- Free online archives: The Daily Bruin Archive

The Daily Bruin is the student newspaper at the University of California, Los Angeles. It began publishing in 1919, the year UCLA was founded.

The Daily Bruin distributes about 6,000 copies across campus three times a week. It also publishes PRIME, a quarterly arts, culture and lifestyle magazine.

== Frequency and governance ==
The Bruin was published Monday through Friday during the school year prior to the COVID-19 pandemic, twice a week during the last week of the quarter, once a week during finals week, and once a week on Mondays in the summer quarter. As of the 2022-2023 school year, the Bruin is published three times a week during the school year on Monday, Wednesday, and Friday. The Bruin's staff also publishes PRIME, a quarterly lifestyle magazine, and maintains Bruinwalk.com, a professor and apartment review site. The Daily Bruin produced a total of 2,419 articles in the 2021/2022 academic year.

It is published by the ASUCLA Communications Board, which sets policies for the newspaper and other campus communications media. The current editor in chief is Alexandra Crosnoe.

The Daily Bruin has 13 editorial departments: news writing, sports writing, arts & entertainment writing, opinion writing, blogging, infographic reporting, digital development, video journalism, copy editing, photojournalism, design, PRIME, enterprise reporting and cartoons and illustrations.

== Location ==
The Daily Bruin office and newsroom is located on the first floor of Kerckhoff Hall, Room 118.

== History ==
=== Nomenclature ===
The Daily Bruin was preceded by the weekly Normal Outlook on the campus of UCLA's predecessor, the Los Angeles State Normal School, from 1910 through 1918 or 1919 (the records are incomplete).

Upon the establishment in fall 1919 of the Southern Branch of the University of California, as UCLA was first known, the twice-weekly Cub Californian was first issued on Sept. 29, 1919. Its name was changed to the California Grizzly with the issue of March 21, 1924, and on Sept. 13, 1925 it began to publish five days a week.

On October 22, 1926, the newspaper became known as the California Daily Bruin. During World War II it reduced its publication frequency to three times a week under the title California Bruin, reverting to a daily publication at war's end. On April 2, 1948, the name was changed to UCLA Daily Bruin.

=== Control ===
The newspaper has generally been under control of the student organization now known as the Associated Students UCLA, or ASUCLA, although during the summer sessions of the 1920s and 1930s the newspapers were used as laboratory papers for university journalism classes. A student body president in 1931 advocated that the Bruin be made independent from control by the ASUC, as it was known then, so it might act as a check on student government. In the 1950s, the Summer Bruin was again taken over by the Administration, and '"controversial social issues" were banned from print during the summers.

Until 1955, the Associated Students was considered the publisher of the Daily Bruin, sometimes directly under the student council and sometimes with the interposition of a Publications Board. Editors were named by the student council. This system resulted in frequent political struggles between the staff (which nominated candidates for the key editorial positions) and the student council.

During the height of the McCarthy era, with the newspaper staff being accused of Communist leanings, the university administration in 1955 revised the governance of the paper and instituted a system whereby the student body itself elected the editor (see below). "Editors had to run for elective office just like politicians, and the newspaper was closely controlled by the [student] Council," wrote William C. Ackerman, the ASUCLA graduate administrator.

The practice of student election of editors ended in 1963 with the establishment of the ASUCLA Communications Board, a student-led organization that selects the editors of the Bruin as well as the editors for the other seven newsmagazines and UCLA Radio.

=== 1920s ===
In 1926, editor John F. Cohee was expelled from school by Ernest Carroll Moore, the campus administrator and director, for what Moore called "certain indecent statements which affront the good name of the women of the University." These were apparently a tongue-in-cheek "report" that some sorority women had been seen cavorting nude in the Pacific Ocean surf. This article was included in a twice-yearly burlesque edition of the Daily Bruin known as "Hell's Bells." (Cohee transferred to the Berkeley campus and graduated there in 1927. He later went on to become a professional reporter.)

Three years later, Director Moore suspended 14 students for publishing the January 23, 1929, issue of "Hell's Bells," "the filthiest and most indecent piece of printed matter that any of us has ever seen." Some of those students were later reinstated. That was the last issue of "Hell's Bells."

=== 1930s ===
- 1935. The student council named Gilbert Harrison as editor. Harrison was soon at loggerheads with Tom Lambert, the ASUC president, who wanted more coverage of the student government. Frustrated, Lambert resigned, and the council named a committee to publish the paper when the staff threatened to strike. Lambert returned to his job.
- 1938. The council named a salaried director of publications who would be responsible for all content, but in October a newly chosen council decided that the appointee would have no editorial control.
- 1939. The student leaders adopted a resolution requiring the Bruin to deny publicity to "all unrecognized organizations." The editor called the action an "unwarranted restriction of press freedom," and four thousand students signed petitions opposing the restriction, which was repealed.

=== 1940s ===
In October 1944 the student president charged that the Bruin was "unrepresentative and self-perpetuating" and that it was controlled by the liberal American Youth for Democracy. The staff threatened to strike but found that the president had already sketched out a plan for substitute staffers, so it refrained.

=== 1950s ===
==== Charges of left-wing influence ====
In spring 1949 Jim Garst and Clancy Sigal were nominated by the Bruin staff as editor and managing editor. Some student leaders charged that the two favored leftist positions. Garst was chosen editor by the student council, but Sigal (who had been asked by a member of the council whether he was "a Communist") was rejected. The staffers refused to work over the summer, and in the fall a new council approved Sigal. The same council, however, refused to reappoint him in the spring 1950 term. A student vote rejected Sigal, 2,272 to 676.

In the spring semester 1951, President Robert Gordon Sproul wrote Provost Clarence Dykstra that he had received letters "pouring in" about opinion columns written by student Art Janov (later the author of The Primal Scream), "including one from the governor's office.... I do hope that some way will be found to keep this young man from using the feature page of the Bruin as a medium for propaganda of the party line." On February 13, 1951, Dean Hahn replied in a memo to Dykstra that "we are still looking for an editor with more moderate leanings."

The student council turned down the staff's nomination of Jerry Schlapik as editor for the spring 1951 term in favor of conservative Bob Strock, who was then deemed ineligible because of a low grade-point average. On February 7, 1951, the council appointed Martin Brower as editor but also chose Rex Rexrode, a non-staffer, as feature (opinion) editor. Brower immediately submitted his resignation, and the entire non-sports editorial staff resigned. Most of them returned to work in two weeks after the council agreed that, from then on, all top editors would be chosen from the newspaper's senior staff.

==== Student election of editors ====
On November 23, 1954, President Robert Gordon Sproul approved a new student-election plan for the newspaper. Dean of Students Milton E. Hahn sent a memorandum to UCLA Chancellor Raymond B. Allen on December 7. 1954. He wrote:

For twenty years there has been no commonly accepted policy regarding the student publications at U.C.L.A. The Bruin has been the chief problem. It has been a prime target for Marxist groups which, at times, have had almost complete control.

Editor Martin McReynolds caught word of the plan and published an editorial on December 8, stating that "Someone, probably the Administration, has been planning this change for at least six weeks. The planning has all been kept secret from The Daily Bruin and the students at large." On the same day, Hahn submitted the plan to the Student Council.

There were to be student elections for editor, who would name the editorial board, subject to approval by the Student Council and veto by the Administration. Because of lack of time, elections would not be held in the spring semester, but an editorial board would be chosen by a two-man committee composed of Student Body President Skip Byrne and an Administration representative.

The plan required that:

- Non-staff opinion pieces would be limited to 150 words in the letters column.
- Controversial articles would be "matched" with an opposing opinion.
- Editorial columns "shall be used by the editor-in-chief in any manner consonant with journalistic practice and the wishes of SLC [Student Legislative Council] subject to the contribution that contributors be bona fide staff members or members of SLC."

A total of 3,004 signatures, representing one-fifth of the student body, were collected for a petition to be sent to Sproul to retract the plan. The number of signatures was about a thousand more than the number of votes in the preceding student-body election.

The Bruin staff nominated six candidates to become editors the following year, but all six were rejected by the selection committee appointed to decide on the new editors.

=== 21st century ===
In 2013, the Daily Bruin's publisher laid off most of its full-time employees, following more than a decade of consistently declining advertising revenues that reflected the national newspaper industry. Despite layoffs, it retained UCLA Student Media Director Doria Deen, editorial advisor Abigail Goldman and Business Manager Jeremy Wildman.

In spring 2016, UCLA's student body voted in favor of the "Daily Bruin and Bruinwalk.com Referendum," which guaranteed student fees to support the Bruin as its print advertising revenues continue to decline.

Following COVID-19 lockdowns in March 2020, the upper management of the Bruin decided to cease all print operations for the rest of the school year after initially pausing it for the first two weeks of the spring quarter. It was the first time the paper had scaled back its daily print operations since World War II. The paper resumed printing once a week the next school year in 2020-2021 while UCLA was still holding all classes remotely, before scaling up to two days a week in 2021-2022 and the current schedule of three days of week in 2022-2023.

==== Stonewall ====
In 2013, the Daily Bruin created the "Stonewall" as an online record of sources who "stonewalled," or refused to speak, with reporters. The "Stonewall" was created in effort to maintain transparency with readers about individuals in the community who thwarted Daily Bruin reporters' attempts at providing information. The most recent stone added to the "Stonewall" was on June 5, 2019, when the UCLA media relations office for several weeks delayed an interview with administrators regarding a professor's conviction of child sexual abuse.

==== The Stack ====
Data editor Neil Bedi launched The Stack, Daily Bruin's data journalism and newsroom tech blog, in March 2015. Articles analyze public data and present them with accompanying quantitative graphics and visualizations. Previous projects include examining the data of the mandatory Undergraduate Students Association Council (USAC) student fees over time, funding sources behind UCLA research projects, and rate of major changes among UCLA students.

The Stack makes the code on its blog available under open-source licenses on GitHub.

== Editor in chief ==
=== Normal Outlook ===
- 1910-1911 Clarence Hodges, Shirley D. Burns
- 1911-1915 No records available
- 1915-1916 Albert T. Blanford, Gertrude C. Maloney, Willette Long, Eva Smith
- 1916-1917 Lee Roy Smith, Eva Throckmorton
- 1917-1918 Elizabeth Lee Polk, Nina Ehlers
- 1918-1919 No records available

=== Cub Californian ===
- 1919-1921 Dale Stoddard, Alice Lookabaugh, Fern Ashley, David K. Barnwell
- 1920-1921 Mildred Sanborn
- 1921-1922 John A. Worley
- 1922-1923 Irving C. Kramer
- 1923 (fall) Irving C. Kramer

=== California Grizzly ===
- 1924 (spring) Fred M. Jordan
- 1924-1925 John F. Cohee, Robert W. Kerr
- 1925-1926 John F. Cohee, Ben Person

=== Daily Bruin ===
==== 1920s ====
- 1926-1927 William E. Forbes
- 1927-1928 James F. Wickizer
- 1928-1929 H. Monte Harrington, Gene Harvey
- 1929-1930 Walter T. Bogart

==== 1930s ====
- 1930-1931 Carl Schaefer, Charles Olton
- 1931-1932 Maxwell Clark
- 1932-1933 George Elmendorf
- 1933-1934 Robert K. Shellaby
- 1934-1935 F. Chandler Harris
- 1935-1936 Gilbert Harrison
- 1936-1937 Stanley Rubin (In 1970, Rubin recalled that in the middle 1930s, Max Rafferty, who served from 1963 to 1971 as California Superintendent of Public Instruction, had physically attacked him over controversial content in The Bruin. Rafferty dispatched a letter to the Los Angeles Times in which he described The Bruin as "one of the most prejudiced newspapers on the Pacific Coast" and complained that the "radicalism" of the publication "is not so funny if it keeps [students] from getting a job.")
- 1937-1938 Roy Swanfeldt, Norman Borisoff
- 1938-1939 William T. Brown, Everett Carter
- 1939-1940 Sanford J. Mock, Richard K. Pryne

==== 1940s ====
- 1940-1941 Bruce Cassiday, Jack Hauptli
- 1941-1942 Malcolm Steinlauf, Robert M. Barsky
- 1942-1943 Tom Smith, Robert Weil, Josephine Rosenfield
- 1943-1944 Adele Truitt, Charlotte Klein, Gloria Farquar
- 1944-1945 Pat Campbell, Helen Licht, Doris Willens
- 1945-1946 Hannah Bloom, Bill Stout, Anne Stern
- 1946-1947 Ann Hebert, Frank Mankiewicz
- 1947-1948 Paul Simqu, Elmer L. (Chally) Chalberg
- 1948-1949 Charles G. Francis, Grover Heyler
- 1949-1950 James D. Garst, Harold E. Watkins

==== 1950s ====
- 1950-1951 Eugene Frumkin, Jerry Schlapik (acting), Martin A. Brower
- 1951-1952 Robert Myers, Peter Graber
- 1952-1953 Richard Schenk, Jack Weber
- 1953-1954 Albert Greenstein, M. E. Vogel
- 1954-1955 Martin D. McReynolds, Irv Drasnin
- 1955-1956 Martin A. Sklar, Clyde E. Rexrode
- 1956-1957 Joseph E. Colmenares
- 1957-1958 Edward B. Robinson
- 1958-1959 Thomas A. Welch
- 1959-1960 Martin A. Kasindorf

==== 1960s ====
- 1960-1961 Morton L. Saltzman, Charles M. Rossi
- 1961-1962 Shirley Mae Folmer
- 1962-1963 Alan R. Rothstein
- 1963-1964 Lester G. Ostrov
- 1964-1965 Philip A. Yaffe
- 1965-1966 Joel E. Boxer
- 1966-1967 Neil Reichline
- 1967-1968 Brian Weiss
- 1968-1969 Mike Levett
- 1969-1970 John Parker

==== 1970s ====
- 1970-1971 Ann Haskins
- 1971-1972 David Lees
- 1972-1973 Shelley Presser
- 1973-1974 Steve Ainsworth
- 1974-1975 Anne Pautler
- 1975-1976 Jim Stebinger
- 1976-1977 Alice Short
- 1977-1979 Joanne Eglash
- 1979-1980 Chris Cameron

==== 1980s ====
- 1981-1982 Jesse Coronado
- 1982-1983 Andrew Schlei
- 1983-1984 Kim Cohn
- 1984 Katherine Jane Bleifer. Bleifer resigned Dec. 14, 1984, and was replaced in the interim by Jerry Abeles, the managing editor.
- 1985 William Rabkin
- 1985-1986 Peter Pae
- 1986-1987 Ronald Scott Bell
- 1987-1988 Penny Rosenberg
- 1988-1989 Nancy McCullough
- 1989-1990 Valarie De La Garza

==== 1990s ====
- 1990-1992 Matthew Fordahl
- 1992-1993 Leila Ansari
- 1993-1994 Josh Romonek
- 1994-1995 Matea Gold
- 1995-1996 Roxane Marquez
- 1996-1997 Patrick Kerkstra
- 1997-1998 Edina Lekovic
- 1998-1999 Adam Yamaguchi
- 1999-2000 Andrea Perera

==== 2000s ====
- 2000-2001 Christine Byrd
- 2001-2002 Timothy Kudo
- 2002-2003 Cuauhtémoc Ortega
- 2003-2004 Kelly Rayburn
- 2004-2005 Tyson Evans
- 2005-2006 Charles Proctor
- 2006-2007 Jeff Schenck
- 2007-2008 Saba Riazati
- 2008-2009 Anthony Pesce
- 2009-2010 Alene Tchekmedyian

==== 2010s ====
- 2010-2011 Farzad Mashhood
- 2011-2012 Lauren Jow
- 2012-2013 James Barragan
- 2013-2014 Jillian Beck
- 2014-2015 Andrew Erickson
- 2015-2016 Sam Hoff
- 2016-2017 Tanner Walters
- 2017-2018 Mackenzie Possee
- 2018-2019 Jacob Preal
- 2019-2020 Angie Forburger

==== 2020s ====
- 2020-2021 Melissa Morris
- 2021-2022 Genesis Qu
- 2022-2023 Victoria Ke Li
- 2023-2024 Isabelle Friedman
- 2024-2025 Lex Wang
- 2025-2026 Dylan Winward

== Awards and recognition ==
The Daily Bruin and its staffers earn honors at local, state, regional and national levels on an annual basis. Listed below are some of the prominent honors the Daily Bruin has received.

=== National ===
Associated Collegiate Press – Pacemaker Awards

- Newspaper Pacemaker
  - Winner: 2019, 2016, 2014, 2011, 2004, 1990
  - Finalist: 2017, 2015, 2012, 2008, 2007, 2006, 2003, 1985
- Online Pacemaker
  - Winner: 2019, 2017, 2016, 2005
  - Finalist: 2012, 2007
- Magazine Pacemaker (for PRIME magazine)
  - Winner: 2019, 2013, 2012
  - Finalist: 2017, 2016

Society of Professional Journalists – National Mark of Excellence Awards

- Best all-around daily student newspaper
  - Winner: 2006, 2004
  - Finalist: 2015, 2014, 2013

=== Regional ===
Society of Professional Journalists – Region 11 Mark of Excellence Awards

- Best all-around daily student newspaper
  - Winner: 2015, 2014, 2013, 2009, 2007, 2005, 2004
  - Finalist: 2018, 2017, 2016, 2012, 2011, 2010, 2006
- Best affiliated website
  - Winner: 2018, 2017, 2011, 2010
  - Finalist: 2015, 2014, 2013, 2012, 2006
- Best student magazine
  - Winner: 2018
  - Finalist: 2017

=== State ===
California College Media Association – Excellence in Student Media Awards

- General newspaper excellence
  - First place: 2016, 2015, 2014, 2011, 2004
  - Second place: 2013, 2012
- General website excellence
  - First place: 2015, 2011, 2004
  - Second place: 2017, 2016, 2014, 2012
  - Third place: 2013
- Best overall design
  - First place: 2015, 2014, 2012
  - Honorable mention: 2017

California Newspaper Publishers Association – Campus Excellence in Journalism Awards

- Best four-year newspaper
  - First place: 2015, 2005, 2004

=== Local ===
Los Angeles Press Club – SoCal Journalism Awards

- Best college newspaper
  - Second place: 2014
  - Third place: 2016, 2015, 2013
- Best news website
  - First place: 2016, 2014
  - Second place: 2015

Awards last updated in October 2019

== Editorial Board ==
The Daily Bruin Editorial Board presents the opinions of veteran staff members of the Bruin about topics relating to UCLA. It is made up of five standing members in addition to staff representatives. The board operates separately from the newsroom, and the editorials represent the majority opinion of the board. Editorials are published once or twice a week throughout the year.

2026-2027 Members of the Board
Name	Position
Alexandra Crosnoe	Editor in chief
Lucine Ekizian	Managing Editor
Sara Green	Opinion Editor
Lilly Leonhardt	Assistant Opinion Editor
Nick Levie	Assistant Opinion Editor
Megan Vahdat	Podcasts Editor
Angelina Alkhouri	Staff representative
Ruby Galbraith	Staff representative
Anna Gu	Staff representative
Alessandra Kahn	Staff representative
Makenna Kramer	Staff representative

== Daily Bruin Hall of Fame ==
- Class of 2000: William E. Forbes (1906–1999), class of 1927, president of the Southern California Music Co. and a regent of the University of California.
- Class of 2001: Flora Lewis (1918–2002), class of 1939, foreign correspondent and columnist.
- Class of 2002: Stanley Rubin (1917-2014), class of 1936, Emmy award-winning screenwriter and producer.
- Class of 2003: Frank Mankiewicz (1924–2014), class of 1947, screenwriter, regional director of the Peace Corps, press attache for Sen. Robert F. Kennedy.
- Class of 2004: Harry Shearer (1943– ), actor and writer
- Class of 2005: Martin A. (Marty) Sklar (1934–2017), vice chairman and principal creative executive for Walt Disney Imagineering.

Other notable alumni (chronological)

- Ralph Bunche, class of 1927, political scientist, diplomat and recipient of the 1950 Nobel Peace Prize.
- Gilbert A. Harrison (1915–2008), class of 1935, editor of the New Republic magazine.
- Togo Tanaka (1916–2009), editor of the Rafu Shimpo newspaper, later sent to the Manzanar internment camp.
- Clancy Sigal (1926–2017), class of 1950, writer.
- Bill Stout (1927–1989), KNXT-TV newsman.
- Gene Frumkin (1928–2007), class of 1951, journalist, poet and professor.
- Carol Burnett (1933– ), American actress, singer, writer and comedian
- Fredy Perlman (1934–1985), class of 1955, author, publisher and activist.
- Jerry Farber (1935– ), English professor and author of The Student as Nigger.
- Art Spander, class of 1960, American sportswriter and columnist, inducted into the Rose Bowl Hall of Fame in 2016.
- Tony Auth (1942–2014), class of 1965, Pulitzer Prize-winning cartoonist for The Philadelphia Inquirer
- David Shaw (1943–2005), class of 1965, Pulitzer Prize-winning writer for the Los Angeles Times who was known for his media criticism.
- Sondhi Limthongkul (1947– ), Thai journalist and opposition leader.
- Gary Knell, class of 1975, president and CEO of National Geographic Society; former CEO of NPR and Sesame Workshop.
- Steve Hartman (sportscaster), class of 1980, sportscaster for KLAC Radio and KCBS Television.
- Jay Samit, class of 1982, digital media innovator and entrepreneur.
- Frank Spotnitz, class of 1982, executive producer of The X-Files.
- David Kahn (sports executive), class of 1983, former president of basketball operations for the Minnesota Timberwolves.
- Doug Chiang, class of 1986, Winner of the 1993 Academy Award for Best Visual Effects. Vice president and executive creative director of Lucasfilm.
- Cari Champion, class of 1998, American broadcast journalist and sports television personality.
- Ben Shapiro, class of 2004, American conservative political commentator.

If not cited here, references can be found within the articles.

== See also ==
- List of student newspapers
