= Wesley R. Fishel =

American political scientist and policy advisor to Ngo Dinh Diem (1919–1977)

Wesley R. Fishel (September 8, 1919 – April 14, 1977) was a professor of political science at Michigan State University. He is best known for his involvement in the Michigan State University Vietnam Advisory Group, where he served as the Chief Advisor from 1956 to 1958. Fishel was an active proponent of America's influence in Vietnam, and was a close friend of South Vietnam's leader, Ngo Dinh Diem. He continued working as a professor at MSU until his death in 1977.

== Early life and education ==
Wesley R. Fishel was born on September 8, 1919, in Cleveland, Ohio. His parents were Clarence and Lillian Pierson Fishel.

Fishel attended Heights High School in Cleveland and graduated in 1937. He went on to attend Georgetown University in Washington, D.C. After two years at Georgetown, Fishel transferred to Northwestern University in Evanston, Illinois, and ultimately received a Bachelor of Science degree in international relations in 1941. In 1946 — 1948, Fishel continued on to receive his doctorate in international relations at the University of Chicago.

In 1940, during his time at Northwestern, Fishel went to Asia for the first time. There, he visited Tokyo and other Japanese cities. This served as his first experience with the politics between the United States and Asia. Between 1941 and 1942, Fishel continued on to work for the Office of Naval Intelligence during World War II. Afterward, he joined the Army as a Japanese intelligence analyst and language officer. His work in the military awarded him a letter of commendation for his efforts in the 3rd Marine Division when it invaded Iwo Jima.

Fishel began teaching in 1948 at the University of California, Los Angeles. His teachings focused on political science.
