= Matthew Arkin =

American actor and acting instructor

- Born: March 21, 1960 (age 66); Brooklyn, New York, U.S.
- Education: Wesleyan University; Fordham University School of Law
- Occupations: Actor, instructor, author
- Years active: 1969–present
- Spouse: Pamela Newkirk (m. 1993; div. 2011)
- Children: 2
- Father: Alan Arkin
- Relatives: Adam Arkin (brother); David I. Arkin (paternal grandfather)

Matthew Arkin (born March 21, 1960) is an American actor, acting instructor, and author.

== Early life and education ==
Arkin was born in Brooklyn, New York, the son of Jeremy Yaffe, a nurse, and actor Alan Arkin. He is the younger brother of actor Adam Arkin. After his parents separated when he was an infant, Arkin was raised by his mother in California until age 7. He then lived with his father and stepmother, actress Barbara Dana, and half-brother Anthony Dana Arkin, in Greenwich Village. In 1968, Arkin and his brother were directed by their father in the Academy Award nominated short film People Soup. Arkin attended Horace Greeley High School in Chappaqua, New York. Arkin graduated from Wesleyan University and earned a J.D. degree from Fordham University School of Law. Although he was raised in a non-denominational household, Arkin is Jewish and identifies with Jewish culture.

For five years Arkin practiced law with small firms in Tarrytown and White Plains, New York. He quit to pursue a career in acting. When asked why he would give up a career in law, Arkin pointed out a laughing audience and said, ""You hear that sound? You know how many people I made laugh when I was a lawyer? None... well, maybe a few judges."

== Career ==
=== Acting ===
Arkin studied acting at the HB Studio under Uta Hagen, Austin Pendleton and Sheldon Patinkin. In 1993, he debuted on Broadway in Neil Simon's Laughter on the 23rd Floor and continued during the production's national tour. He played Ben Silverman in the 1997 Broadway revival of The Sunshine Boys. Arkin was nominated for the Drama Desk Award for Outstanding Featured Actor in a Play for his role as Gabe in the 1999 Off-Broadway premiere of the Pulitzer Prize-winning drama Dinner with Friends. Arkin played the role of Reggie Ellis in the 2006 Broadway production of Losing Louie.

Arkin also appeared in a variety of films and television shows, including All My Children (2007), Law & Order (1991–2009) and 100 Centre Street (2001).

At the South Coast Repertory in Orange County, California, Arkin originated roles in the world premieres of Richard Greenberg's Our Mother's Brief Affair (2009) and Steven Drukman's The Prince of Atlantis (2011). In 2013, Arkin portrayed the 600-pound main character in the West Coast premiere of Samuel Hunter's The Whale.

==== Teaching ====
Beginning in 2008, Arkin taught acting technique at the HB Studio in New York City and later at the Actors Studio in Los Angeles. In 2015, Arkin accepted the position as Director of the Acting Intensive Program at South Coast Repertory in Southern California.

=== Author ===
In 2016, Arkin published the detective novel In the Country of the Blind.

== Personal life ==
Arkin married Pamela Newkirk in May 1993, with whom he has two children. They divorced in 2011. He resides in Pasadena, California.
