= Businessmen's Educational Fund =

The Businessmen's Educational Fund (BEF) was an American non-profit organization which was founded in 1968. Its goals were to research, reassess and reduce the influence of the military in US economics and politics.

Its founder chairman was Harold Willens, president of the Factory Equipment Supply Corporation, who had also founded the Business Executives Move for Vietnam Peace in 1967. Willens had been a captain in the US Marines during the Second World War and then became successful as a businessman afterwards. The organization was funded by donations and dues which were $100 for individuals up to $25,000 for the 17 founder members who helped Willens start the organization. Its staff included A. Ernest Fitzgerald – the whistleblower who testified about the problems with the Lockheed C-5A and was fired from the USAF's Senior Executive Service on the orders of President Nixon, resulting in the case of Nixon v. Fitzgerald. Fitzgerald produced literature and conducted a program of seminars across the country on the topic of waste in the military.

The BEF sent out a letter by General David M. Shoup, the former Commandant of the Marine Corps who was critical of the US foreign policy at that time, calling it "militaristic and aggressive". This was sent to 25,000 senior executives across the nation and 1,700 responses were received. The majority of these agreed with the general's statement but the executives did not want to say so publicly. Willens found this discouraging, considering that the business community was too cautious and conformist, "Corporate executives are acting in accordance with an established set of priorities, including being popular, fashionable, promoted and invited to the White House."

The group was put on to the original Nixon's Enemies List and the master list of Nixon political opponents for bankrolling a syndicated 5-minute radio program considered negative toward the Nixon administration.

== See also ==
- Military–industrial complex
