= Kings of the Sun =

1963 British film by J. Lee Thompson

- Theatrical release poster by Frank McCarthy
- Directed by: J. Lee Thompson
- Screenplay by: James R. Webb
- Story by: Elliott Arnold
- Produced by: Lewis J. Rachmil
- Starring: Yul Brynner; George Chakiris
- Narrated by: James Coburn
- Cinematography: Joseph MacDonald
- Edited by: William Reynolds
- Music by: Elmer Bernstein
- Production company: The Mirisch Corporation
- Distributed by: United Artists
- Release date: December 18, 1963 (United States)
- Running time: 108 minutes
- Country: United States
- Language: English
- Budget: $4 million
- Box office: $1,600,000 (US/ Canada)

Kings of the Sun is a 1963 DeLuxe Color film directed by J. Lee Thompson for Mirisch Productions set in Mesoamerica at the time of the conquest of Chichen Itza by Hunac Ceel. Location scenes were filmed in Mazatlán and Chichen Itza. The film marks the second project Thompson completed with Yul Brynner within a year — the other being Taras Bulba.

== Plot ==
Balam is the son of the ruler of a Mayan city-state whose people use wooden swords with obsidian edges. His father is killed in battle against metal-blade armed rivals led by Hunac Ceel. Balam succeeds to the throne, but is convinced by his advisers, including the head priest, to lead his followers away from the Yucatán, sail to the American Gulf Coast region, so they might regain their strength and fight again another day.

Balam's party comes to a coastal settlement with many boats. Balam wants the population of the settlement to join him with their boats. The settlement's chief agrees if Balam agrees to marry his daughter, Ixchel, and make her Queen. Balam agrees.

The new land they arrive in across the Gulf is a province occupied by a Native American tribe led by Black Eagle. They are none too pleased about these strange, uninvited immigrants. In a small raid to capture one of the Mayans, Black Eagle is wounded and taken captive to the Mayans' fortified settlement. Balam's love interest Ixchel tends to the Indian's wounds and gains an interested suitor, one who is more forthcoming with his love for her.

Balam is under pressure to resume their custom of human sacrifice by sacrificing Black Eagle. Balam has always been against the policy of human sacrifice and sets Black Eagle free.

Eventually, the two leaders agree to coexist in peace. However, due to jealousy, they quarrel over Ixchel and the Native Americans depart, just as Hunac Ceel finds Balam and his people. Hunac Ceel's army mounts a furious attack, but is eventually defeated by the united front of Indians and the transplanted Mayans. Black Eagle is killed in the fighting, resolving the love triangle.

== Cast ==
- Yul Brynner as Chief Black Eagle
- George Chakiris as Balam
- Shirley Anne Field as Ixchel
- Richard Basehart as Ah Min
- Brad Dexter as Ah Haleb
- Barry Morse as Ah Zok
- Armando Silvestre as Isatai
- Leo Gordon as Hunac Ceel
- Victoria Vetri as Ixzubin
- Rudy Solari as Pitz
- Ford Rainey as The chief

== Production ==
The Mirisch brothers, United Artists and Yul Brynner had enjoyed a success collaborating on The Magnificent Seven and signed a three picture film deal in 1961. Walter Mirisch wrote in his memoirs that Kings of the Sun began when Arnold Picker of United Artists read an article about Mound builders of Mexico. Since Seven had been set in Mexico, he thought Brynner would be ideal for a film about the Mexican Indians and Brynner was enthusiastic. Mirisch commissioned an original treatment for a film from Elliott Arnold which theorised about what happened to the Mayan civilisation and who built the mounds in the present-day USA specifically as a vehicle for Brynner. It supposes that over a thousand years ago the Mayans fled to the area of present-day Texas where they exchanged technology with the local Indians.

The movie was originally known as The Mound Builders. Brynner liked the treatment so much he agreed to make it as the first movie as part of his three-picture deal.

Arnold wrote the original screenplay. Walter Mirisch says he was unhappy with it and got James Webb to write a new draft. Lewis Rachmil was hired to produce.

Anthony Quinn was originally named as Brynner's co-star. Lee Thompson signed to direct as part of a four-picture contract with the Mirisches.

Brynner ended up appearing in Flight from Ashiya before Kings of the Sun; that film co-starred George Chakiris, who also had a multi-picture contract with the Mirisches, and he would re-team with Brynner on Kings instead of Quinn. Thompson had Shirley Anne Field under personal contract for two films and she was cast as the female lead.

Filming started 3 January 1963 and wound up 5 April.

"The picture has something to say about capital punishment and peaceful co existence", said Brynner shortly after filming completed. "I think it is one of the best jobs Lee ever directed. He doesn't just use thousands of extras; believes audiences don't care any more unless the story is one of relationships among people. And Lee has an extraordinary talent for sweeping from the spectacular to the personal story."

Thomson had previously made a film about capital punishment, Yield to the Night and said Kings of the Sun dealt with a similar theme. "About 98% of those who see the picture will say it is a story about Mayan civilisation and how sacrifice is wrong", predicted Thompson. "Two percent however will say the director is drawing a modern parallel with capital punishment, that he has made another film against capital punishment. And I shall be delighted."

== Reception ==
Walter Mirisch later reflected:

Kings of the Sun was not successful, either critically or commercially. It wasn't made for the right reasons, and that is most often an insuperable handicap. Our creative team lacked passion for what we were doing and its commercial values could not overcome that. Not being enthusiastic about it, I should have taken a position. By just letting the project move from one stage to the next, I allowed it to progress further than it should have. Arnold Picker was enthusiastic and kept pushing it, but the problems of making the film and its content were not his responsibility. I always blamed myself for its failure. I had thought of it as a vehicle for the star power of Yul Brynner, who was an important international star by then. But that was not a good enough reason for doing a film about which I had serious misgivings.

=== Critical response ===
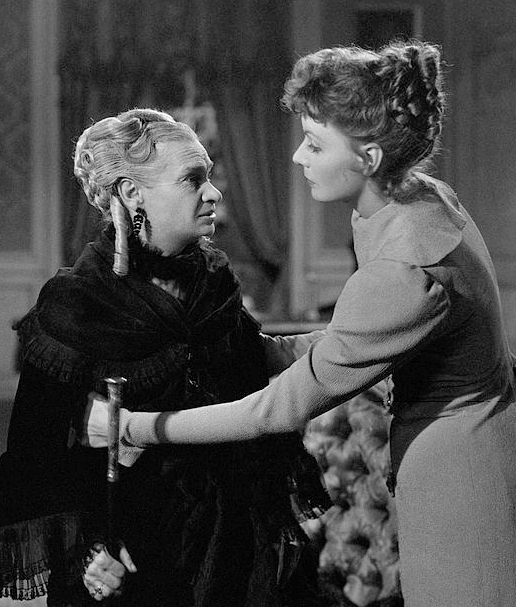
Maria Ouspenskaya's (left) grey hair in the 1937 film Conquest.

Critics tended to receive the film negatively because of its overly ponderous and melodramatic presentation. The New York Times film critic, Bosley Crowther, gave the film a mixed review, writing, "Miss Field seems a pallid specimen among the redskins, but she fares better than poor Richard Basehart. As the high priest of the Mayans, swathed in dirty dresses and adorned with a mountainous gray wig, he looks exactly like the late Maria Ouspenskaya. J. Lee Thompson, the director who foisted last year's Taras Bulba on unsuspecting Christmas audiences, has done it again."

=== Novelization ===
A tie-in paperback novelization of the screenplay, by Harold Calin — a ubiquitous paperback novelist of the era, best known for his novels of men at war — was commissioned by Lancer Books and released to coincide with the release of the film. Its text occupies 122 pages of very small print (typical of the period) and the copyright is © 1963 Mirisch Company. The price on the cover: 40¢.

== See also ==
- List of American films of 1963
- Maya warfare
- Whitewashing in film
- The Feathered Serpent (TV series)
