= Daniel Schorr =

American journalist

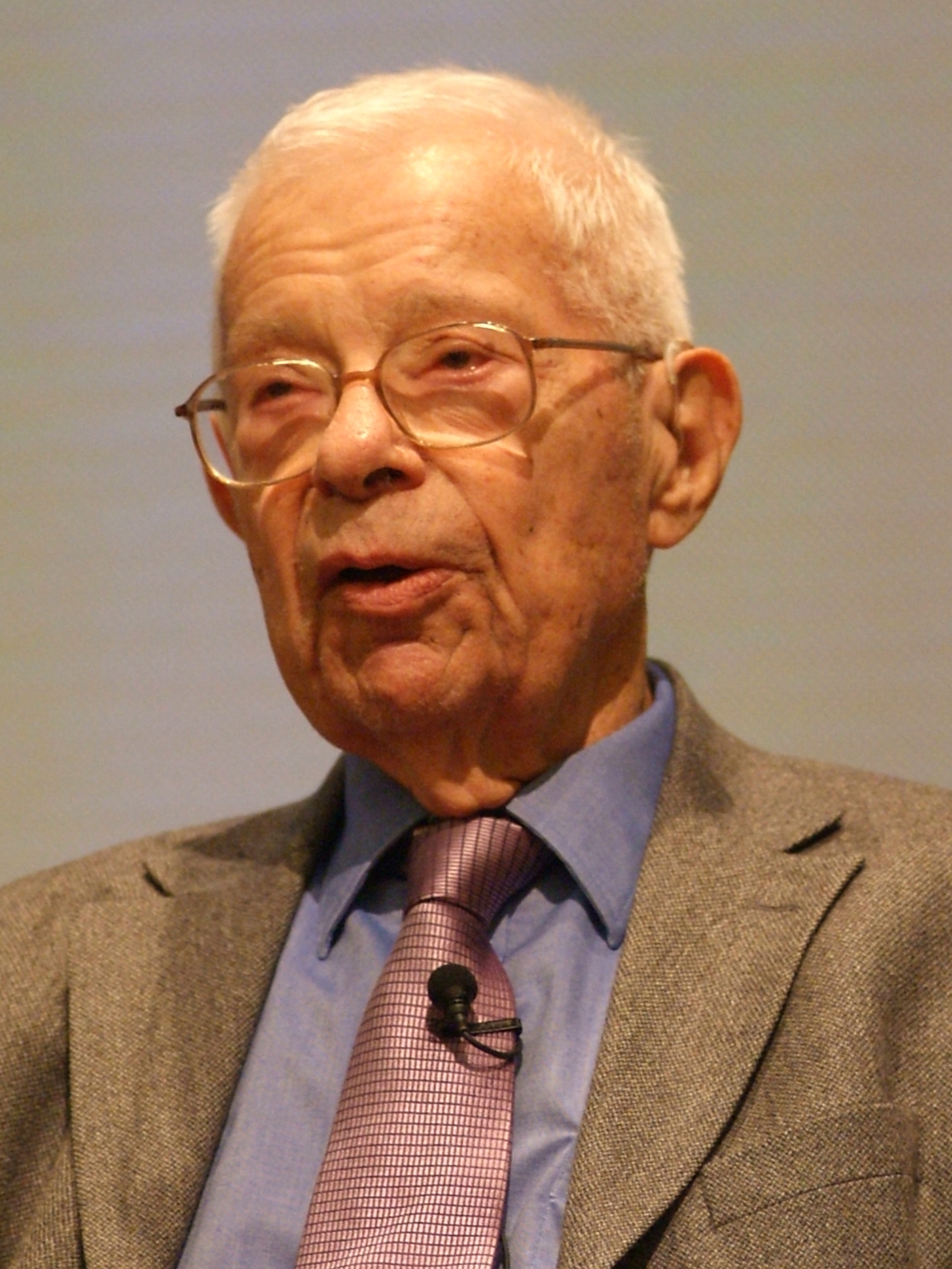
- Schorr in 2006
- Born: Daniel Louis Schorr; August 31, 1916; New York City, U.S.
- Died: July 23, 2010 (aged 93); Washington, D.C., U.S.
- Occupation: Journalist
- Spouse: Lisbeth Bamberger

Daniel Louis Schorr (August 31, 1916 – July 23, 2010) was an American journalist who covered world news for more than 60 years. He was most recently a Senior News Analyst for National Public Radio (NPR). Schorr won three Emmy Awards for his television journalism.

== Early life ==
Schorr was born in the Bronx, New York, the son of Russian-Jewish immigrants Tillie Godiner and Gedaliah Tchornemoretz. He began his journalism career at the age of 13, when he came upon a woman who had jumped or fallen from the roof of his apartment building. After calling the police, he phoned The Bronx Home News and was paid $5 for his information.

He attended DeWitt Clinton High School in the West Bronx, where he worked on the Clinton News, the school paper. He graduated from City College of New York in 1939 while working for the Jewish Daily Bulletin. Schorr also worked for the Jewish Telegraphic Agency as a chief news editor from 1934 to 1948. During World War II, Schorr served in Army Intelligence at Fort Polk, Louisiana, and at Fort Sam Houston, Texas.

In January 1967, he married Lisbeth Bamberger, a graduate of the University of California, Berkeley.

== CBS News ==
Following several years as a stringer, including bylines in The New York Times, which led to a tryout but no job despite repeated attempts, in 1953 he joined CBS News as one of the recruits of Edward R. Murrow (becoming part of the later generation of Murrow's Boys). In 1955, with the post-Stalin thaw in the Soviet Union, he received accreditation to open a CBS bureau in Moscow. In June 1957, he obtained an exclusive interview with Nikita Khrushchev, the Soviet Communist Party chief. It aired on CBS's Face the Nation, Schorr's first television interview. Schorr left the Soviet Union later that year, because of Soviet censorship laws. When he applied for a new visa, it was denied by the Soviets.

In January 1962, he aired the first examination of everyday life under communism in East Germany, The Land Beyond the Wall: Three Weeks in a German City, which the Times called a "journalistic coup". After agreeing not to foster "propaganda" for the United States, Schorr was granted the rights to conduct the interviews in Rostock. By airing everyday life, Schorr painted a picture of the necessity for a communist state to seal itself off from the West in order to survive.

President John F. Kennedy's Secretary of State Dean Rusk criticized Schorr's actions in an August 10, 1962, diplomatic cable for a checkbook journalism story in which, "Schorr involved himself in a matter which was far beyond his private or journalistic responsibilities and proceeded amateurishly in a matter filled with greatest danger for all concerned. As we anticipated, [the] other side turned out to be fully aware of the matter and laid a trap which could have resulted in [a] massacre [of] those involved." A meeting with the State Department over the matter recorded in a cable stated, "Schorr appeared chastened by fact that a plan which was to be his greatest achievement had failed. He did not give slightest appearance of being contrite."

In 1964, Schorr reported—inaccurately— that right-wing Germans were enthusiastic about presidential nominee Barry Goldwater, and that Goldwater had planned a postconvention trip mainly involving an American military recreation center in Berchtesgaden, site of a favorite Hitler retreat.

== 1970s ==
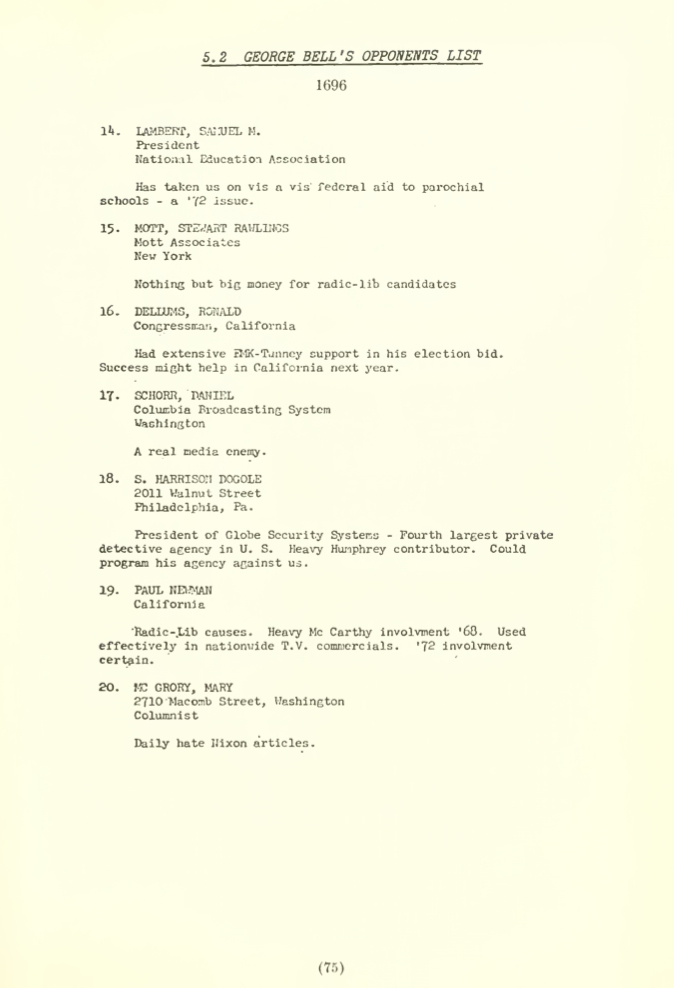
"A real media enemy": Schorr is listed on page three of Nixon's Enemies List, compiled by Charles Colson and written by George T. Bell.

Schorr attracted the anger of Richard Nixon's White House. In 1971, after a dispute with White House aides, Schorr's friends, neighbors, and co-workers were questioned by the Federal Bureau of Investigation (FBI) about his habits. They were told that Schorr was under consideration for a high-level position in the environmental area. Schorr knew nothing about it. Later, during the Watergate hearings, it was revealed that Nixon aides had drawn up what became known as Nixon's Enemies List, and Daniel Schorr was on that list. Famously, Schorr read the list aloud on live TV, surprised to be reading his own name in that context. Schorr won Emmys for news reporting in 1972, 1973, and 1974.

Schorr provoked intense controversy in 1976 when he received and made public the contents of the secret Pike Committee report on illegal Central Intelligence Agency (CIA) and FBI activities. Called to testify before Congress, he refused to identify his source on First Amendment grounds, risking imprisonment. This did not mollify CBS executives, and Schorr ultimately resigned from his position at CBS in September 1976. Although scolded at first for his television report by former CIA director Richard Helms, Schorr was vindicated by the text of the report, which he had obtained from an undisclosed source and sent to The Village Voice.

Schorr "remained silent in the face of false suspicions that another CBS correspondent, Lesley Stahl, had given the (Pike) report to The Voice". Roger Mudd stated in his autobiography that Schorr personally spread rumors that Stahl had leaked the paper, while Stahl in her autobiography stated that she was "flabbergasted" at the accusation from Schorr and the resulting furor within CBS as the executives were "deciding what to do" with her over the serious journalistic breach she was accused of, while Nora Ephron reports that Stahl considered a slander suit against Schorr. Schorr later donated his profits from the sale of the Pike papers to the Reporters' Committee for Freedom of the Press.

On May 14, 2006, on NPR's Weekend Edition, Schorr mentioned a meeting at the White House that took place with colleague A. M. Rosenthal and president Gerald Ford. Ford mentioned that the Rockefeller Commission had access to various CIA documents, including those referring to political assassinations.

== Later work ==
In 1977, Schorr was hired by Reese Schonfeld as a White House correspondent for ITNA (Independent Television News Association), a news agency serving independent television news stations in the U.S. In 1979, Schonfeld and Ted Turner brought Schorr to Cable News Network (CNN), where he was the first on-camera employee hired. He reported news and delivered commentary and news analysis on the fledgling CNN. His contract was not renewed in 1985, one of the two times he stated he was "fired". He then took the position as Senior News Analyst at NPR, a position he held for decades up to the time of his death. In that position, he regularly commented on current events for programs including All Things Considered and Weekend Edition. He also wrote a column for The Christian Science Monitor for several decades. Schorr was called "reliably liberal", and was "widely regarded as a liberal" according to another source, though he regarded the label as inaccurate.

In 1994, Schorr narrated the TV miniseries, Watergate. In the late 1990s, he appeared briefly as a newscaster in three Hollywood movies: The Net (1995), The Game (1997), and The Siege (1998). In The Game, Schorr appeared as himself as an agent of an organization that interferes with the main character's life. He also appeared as himself in the docufiction film World War Three that presented an alternative ending to the USA/USSR Cold War.

Schorr was elected to the American Academy of Arts and Sciences in 2002.

== Other ==
Though not a fan of rock music, Schorr became friends with composer Frank Zappa after the latter contacted him, asking for help with a voter registration drive. Schorr made an appearance with Zappa on February 10, 1988, where he sang "It Ain't Necessarily So" and "Summertime". Schorr delivered the eulogy on NPR after Zappa's death on December 4, 1993; he professed not to understand Zappa's lengthy discourses on music theory, but he found a kindred spirit—a serious man with a commitment to free speech.

About 20 years after Nixon's resignation, Schorr attended a dinner where Nixon spoke about the Soviet Union. After the dinner ended, Schorr walked up to Nixon and said, "Mr. Nixon, I'm not sure you'll remember me." Nixon replied, "Dan Schorr, damn near hired you once."

== Death ==
Schorr died from an apparent "short illness" on July 23, 2010, at a Washington, D.C., hospital, at the age of 93. Schorr's last broadcast commentary for NPR aired on Saturday, July 10, 2010 (on Weekend Edition). His remains were buried at Parklawn Memorial Park in Rockville, Maryland.

== Awards ==
- Emmy Award for "outstanding achievement within a regularly scheduled news program", 1972, 1973, and 1974.
- George Polk Award for Radio Commentary, for his work on NPR, 1993.
- Alfred I. duPont-Columbia University "Golden Baton" for "Exceptional Contributions to Radio and Television Reporting and Commentary", 1996.
- Edward R. Murrow Award for Lifetime Achievement in Broadcasting, 2002.
- Honorary Doctor of Humane Letters (L.H.D.) degree from Whittier College (2003)

Listed as number 17 on Nixon's Enemies List, something he discovered while reading the just obtained list live on the air. He was later named in the Nixon articles of impeachment. Even late in life, he considered being named on the Enemies List one of the greatest honors in his life.

== Books ==
External videos
- Booknotes interview with Schorr on Staying Tuned: A Life in Journalism, July 1, 2001, C-SPAN

- (2007) Come to Think of It: Notes on the Turn of the Millennium. Viking Adult. ISBN 0-670-01873-2.
- (2005) The Senate Watergate Report: The Historic Ervin Committee Report, Which Initiated the Fall of a President. Carroll & Graf. ISBN 0-7867-1709-2.
- (2002) Staying Tuned: A Life in Journalism. Washington Square Press. ISBN 0-671-02088-9.
- (1998) Forgive Us Our Press Passes: Selected Works (1972–1998). O'Brien Center for Scholarly Pubns. ISBN 0-9626954-6-7.
- (1978) Clearing the Air. Berkley. ISBN 0-425-03903-X.
- (1970) Don't Get Sick in America. Aurora Publishers. ISBN 0-87695-103-5.
