= Chain Reaction (sculpture) =

Sculpture by Paul Conrad in Santa Monica, California, U.S.

Coordinates: 34.009768°N 118.490096°W

- Artist: Paul Conrad
- Year: 1991, dedicated 1992
- Type: Sculpture
- Medium: Copper chain link and stainless steel
- Dimensions: 8 metres (26 ft) tall
- Location: Santa Monica, California, United States
- Owner: Administered by City of Santa Monica Arts Department

Chain Reaction is a peace monument and public art sculpture composed of a metal framework of stainless steel and fiberglass surrounded by concrete, depicting a mushroom cloud created by a nuclear explosion. Designed by American editorial cartoonist Paul Conrad and built by Peter M. Carlson, the 5.5-ton, 8-meter (26-foot) high sculpture was installed in 1991 adjacent to the Santa Monica Civic Center in Santa Monica, California.

An inscription at the base of the sculpture reads, "This is a statement of peace. May it never become an epitaph." The theme of the sculpture reflects the subject of nuclear disarmament. UCLA professor Paul Von Blum places the sculpture in the category of late 20th and early 21st century contemporary American public political artwork in the tradition of commemorative works throughout the United States, calling the work "a powerful warning about the continuing dangers of nuclear war".

Conrad first expressed interest in building the sculpture in either Beverly Hills or Santa Monica in 1988. He built the sculpture with the help of an anonymous donation of $250,000 and donated the sculpture to the city of Santa Monica after it was approved by the city. It was later revealed that the donation came from philanthropist Joan Kroc, widow of Ray Kroc, the founder of the McDonald's corporation. Joan Kroc spent millions campaigning for nuclear disarmament in the 1980s. In 2012, the sculpture became the first work of public art designated as a historic landmark in the City of Santa Monica.

== Background ==
Conrad became the editorial cartoonist at the Denver Post in 1950. While at the Denver Post he first began to draw cartoons about peace and nuclear weapons. His cartoon depicting the ending of the atmospheric nuclear testing moratorium in 1961 was categorized by Gamson and Stuart (1992) as falling under the universal “Common Security” media frame popularized by the peace movement in the United States. These types of cartoons emphasized progress towards disarmament and “mutual cooperation, trade, cultural interaction, problem solving, and peacemaking” towards other nations, such as the Soviet Union.

He joined the Los Angeles Times in 1964 where he spent the next four decades until he retired. After criticizing president Richard Nixon during the Watergate scandal, Conrad was the only cartoonist to appear on Nixon's Enemies List. In the 1980s, Conrad criticized the military buildup and arms race advocated by president Ronald Reagan, and the involvement of the Reagan administration in the Iran–Contra affair, the illegal covert operation which sold weapons to Iran to secure the release of hostages while funding the contras in Nicaragua with the proceeds from the arms sales.

Conrad later began working as a sculptor, often donating smaller works for fundraisers. After giving a lecture, Conrad was introduced to philanthropist Joan Kroc, widow of Ray Kroc, the founder of the McDonald's corporation. Kroc was active in the anti-nuclear movement in the United States and was known as a generous patron of the arts. After becoming friends with Conrad and his wife, she anonymously contributed $250,000 to build the anti-nuclear sculpture that would become Chain Reaction.

== Design ==
U.S. nuclear weapon tests c. 1952

The sculpture is based on a cartoon sketch by Conrad. According to the Chain Reaction City Landmark Assessment Report by ICF International:

the sculpture has a disheveled quality akin to the sketch-like markings and distorted proportions [of] Paul Conrad's political cartoons...this quality is conveyed by the...treatment of the stem, the irregular placement of the links, and a subtle distortion of scale between the tall stem, its pronounced bulges, and a relatively small mushroom cloud. The ability of the large brass links to catch light and define pockets of random shadow in the small spaces between them is similar in effect to the stark treatment of light [and] dark that Conrad often employed in his political cartoons.

Custom fabricator Peter M. Carlson, who also created sculptures for artists Ellsworth Kelly, Jeff Koons, Roy Lichtenstein, Robert Rauschenberg, and Charles Ray, assembled the 26-foot high sculpture depicting an upwardly expanding nuclear mushroom cloud in the form of a "large metal chain". The look and structure of the chain was created by linking 38,000 hollow brass J-shaped pipes used for plumbing fixtures. The pipes are welded together and attached by screws and wire to fiberglass covering a steel frame.

The theme of the sculpture reflects the subject of nuclear disarmament.

== Proposal ==
Conrad expressed interest in building the sculpture in either Beverly Hills or Santa Monica. In 1988, he created a two-foot model of the sculpture and proposed his work to the Santa Monica Art Commission. Santa Monica debated the proposal for the next four years. While Santa Monica considered the proposal, Conrad proposed the sculpture to the Beverly Hills Fine Arts Committee in early 1989. The committee, appointed by the Beverly Hills City Council, deliberated Conrad's proposed sculpture for three months. During that time, Conrad was attacked as an antisemite by several residents of Beverly Hills because of his recent editorial cartoons depicting the Israeli–Palestinian conflict during the intifada. The Beverly Hills committee eventually turned down the proposal for the Chain Reaction sculpture on April 12, 1989, citing the lack of a suitable site in Beverly Hills that could accommodate the structure. "It is a piece of monumental proportions that needs a very large, large area," committee chairwoman Ellen Byrens told the Los Angeles Times.

At the same time in Santa Monica, 730 Santa Monica residents in an informal survey by the Santa Monica Art Commission expressed their recommendation that the city should not accept the sculpture for display, while 392 agreed that it should be installed. Despite the negative public reaction, the Art Commission voted four separate times to accept the work, with the final vote taking place in 1990. The City Council finally approved the work in 1991. Funds were donated to the Santa Monica Arts Foundation to build it and the sculpture was given to the city as a gift. The city's acceptance of the controversial peace sculpture reflected the progressive history of Santa Monica's councilmembers, who had become a majority in 1981 just after the conservative Reagan administration took office. At the time of Conrad's proposal, the councilmembers were known for being aligned with progressive issues, including the "anti-war position" reflected in the theme of Conrad's sculpture.

== Location and installation ==
Chain Reaction sculpture in Santa Monica, California

Several locations were initially considered for the sculpture. In 1989, the Arts Commission approved a site located at 14th Street and Olympic Boulevard, while a site facing the Memorial Park Gymnasium was also considered and approved. Chain Reaction was finally installed in 1991 on the lawn of the Santa Monica Civic Center. It resides on the east side of Main Street between the Santa Monica Courthouse and the Santa Monica Civic Auditorium, across the street from the campus headquarters of the RAND Corporation. The sculpture is located approximately four city blocks away from Santa Monica beach and the Pacific Ocean, just east of the Santa Monica Pier.

Two plaques appear at the base of the sculpture, with one bearing the name of the artist (Paul Conrad), the title of the work and date (Chain Reaction, 1991), a description of the material used to construct the sculpture (Copper chain link and stainless steel) and information about the work (Collection of the City of Santa Monica. A donation from an anonymous donor. A project of the Santa Monica Arts Commission). The inscription on the second plaque reads, "This is a statement of peace. May it never become an epitaph."

Chain Reaction was formally dedicated the next year at the "Peace Day" festival at the Santa Monica Civic Center on August 1, 1992. Hiroshima survivor Kaz Suyeishi spoke at the dedication.

== Maintenance and restoration ==
The sculpture was surveyed and considered "well maintained" by the Smithsonian's "Save Outdoor Sculpture!" program in March 1995. After Conrad died in 2010, the city of Santa Monica began to reevaluate the structural integrity of the sculpture. In June 2011, an inspector observed children climbing the sculpture. Safety tests were performed showing that the underlying structure built using fiberglass and copper chains was stable. However, questions were raised about the long term integrity of the fiberglass. An inspection found rust and corrosion on the steel frame skeleton and the revealed that the anchor bolts holding the sculpture to the base were weakened. Shortly after the inspection, the city installed a safety fence around the sculpture to protect the public.

The city's Arts Commission voted in February 2012 to allow the work to be removed from public display. The Santa Monica City Council approved the Arts Commission's recommendation the next month. The city council delayed taking action to allow supporters time to raise funds to cover the cost of repairs. Los Angeles Times art critic Christopher Knight defended the sculpture, citing a 2012 report commissioned by the city from a structural engineer who concluded that "the sculpture is not an imminent hazard nor should it be considered dangerous".

While fundraising to preserve the work was underway, the city of Santa Monica filed an application in May 2012 to nominate the sculpture for landmark status. After a public hearing in July, the Santa Monica Landmarks Commission selected the sculpture as a landmark. Chain Reaction is the first work of public art named a landmark by the city of Santa Monica.

The City Council set a deadline of February 1, 2014, for supporters of the sculpture to contribute to restoration funds, otherwise the sculpture could face decommissioning. Community activists debated how to pay for needed repairs and a series of fundraisers were held to contribute to the restoration project. On February 25, the Santa Monica City Council voted 6–1 to use $100,000 in public donations to finish refurbishing the work.

== Reception ==
UCLA professor Paul Von Blum places Conrad and his sculpture in the category of late 20th and early 21st century contemporary American public political artwork, calling it "a powerful warning about the continuing dangers of nuclear war", in the tradition of American commemorative works about disturbing events. Von Blum compares Conrad's work to that of American public sculptors such as Beniamino Bufano, George Segal, Luis Jimenez and Maya Lin.

== See also ==
- Culture of Los Angeles
- Nuclear Energy (sculpture)
