= Nuclear energetics =

Nuclear energetics may refer to:

- Nuclear physics
  - High energy nuclear physics
- Nuclear energy (disambiguation)
