= Yorty v. Chandler =

1970 California court decision

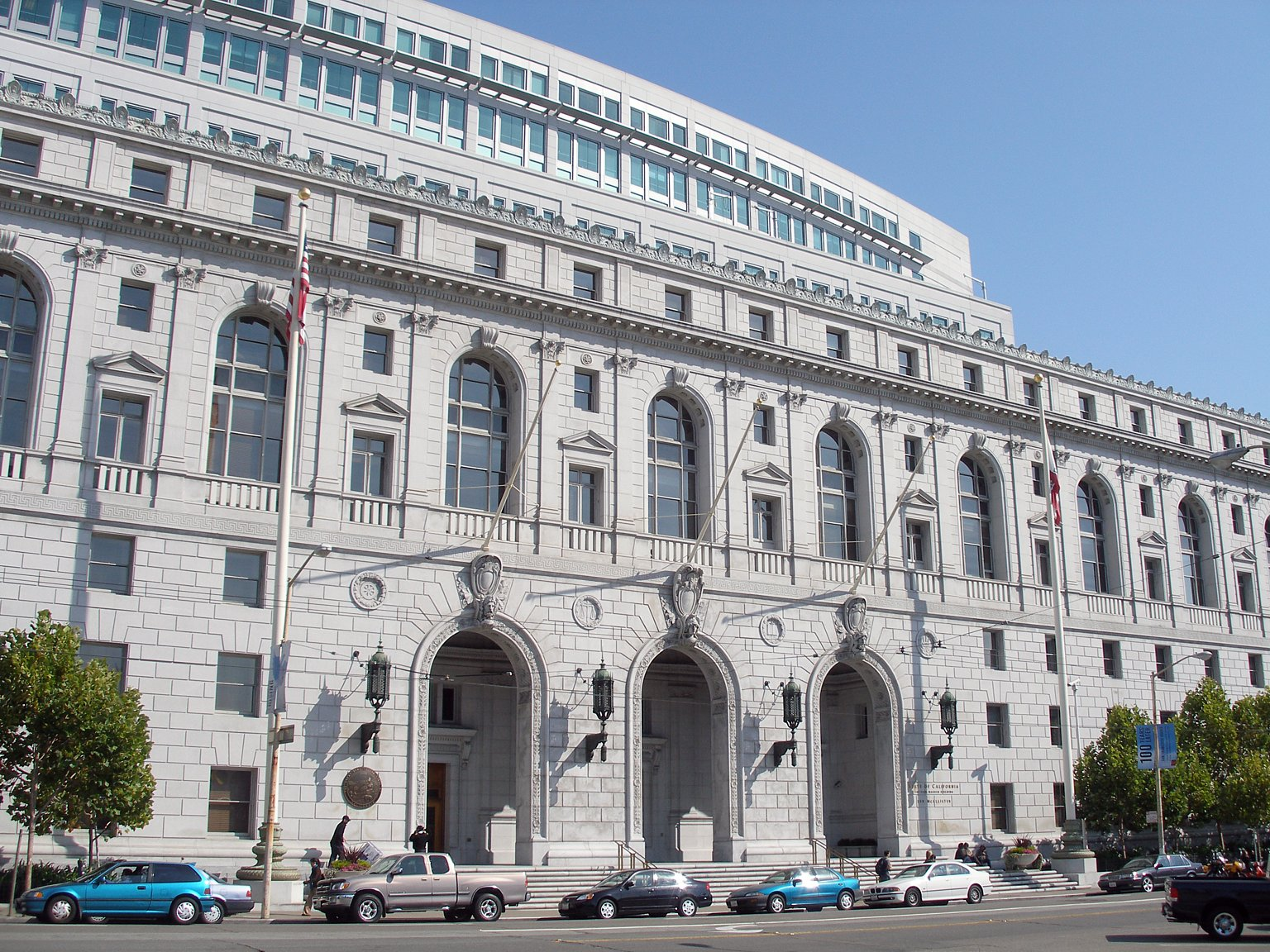
- Court: California Court of Appeals, 2nd District
- Full case name: Samuel W. Yorty, Plaintiff and Appellant, v. Otis Chandler et al., Defendants and Respondents.
- Citation: 15 December 1970

Court membership
- Judges sitting: Fleming, Roth, Compton

Case opinions
- Editorial cartoons necessarily use "rhetorical hyperbole" to communicate and if no reasonable person would understand the meaning conveyed by the cartoon literally then literal readings of the cartoon cannot be used as the basis of a libel action.
- Decision by: Fleming
- Concurrence: Compton

Keywords
- Defamation; Editorial cartoon; First Amendment to the United States Constitution

Yorty v. Chandler, 13 Cal.App.3d 467 (1970), was a decision by the California Court of Appeals, 2nd District involving how strictly an editorial cartoon needed to be interpreted in lawsuits for libel. It is a significant decision in the case law of applying the First Amendment to editorial cartoons and has been cited as a persuasive authority by other U.S. courts.

== Prior history ==
Sam Yorty was the Democratic Mayor of Los Angeles from 1961 to 1973. In November 1968, Richard Nixon won the presidential election and began the transition process. Yorty made it known that he would like to be the Secretary of Defense (Note: then-Chair of the House Republican Conference Melvin Laird became the actual Secretary of Defense) in the new Administration. The editorial cartoonist for the Los Angeles Times at this time was Paul Conrad. The possibility of Nixon choosing Yorty for such an important Cabinet position inspired him to caricature Yorty's desire. This cartoon was not flattering as it depicted a group of orderlies with a straitjacket beckoning Yorty to accompany them, presumably to a psychiatric institution. Yorty sued Otis Chandler as publisher of the paper as well as the Times, its parent company, and Conrad for $2,000,000 (Note: equivalent to $16,580,977 in 2025) over the cartoon, claiming that it told the paper's readers that Yorty "was insane and should be placed in a straight jacket." The Superior court dismissed the claim.

== Decision ==
Yorty contended that the editorial cartoon had libeled him in two ways. The first defaming implication of the cartoon was that Yorty was obviously unqualified for high national office. The newspaper defendants countered that the first implication was protected by the First Amendment as an expression of opinion. The Court stated that "settled law" protected opinions about the fitness, or lack of fitness, of a person for public office and as such were not libelous "...even though...[the] views are those of a political adversary and are presented in rhetorical hyperbole."

Yorty's second claim was that the cartoon asserted Yorty's belief that his fitness for such an office was so obviously wrong that it demonstrated he was mentally incompetent. The Court ruled that the content of the cartoon was not intended to be a literal depiction and that reasonable readers would know this:

From the cartoon no reasonable person would assume more than that in the opinion of the Los Angeles Times the mayor was not qualified for the post of Secretary of Defense, President-elect Nixon would not appoint him, and it was foolish of the mayor to aspire to an appointment for which he was not qualified. No reasonable person would interpret the cartoon as a report that Mayor Yorty had actually made the statement shown in the caption or that he was in fact mentally deranged or insane.

Because there was only one reasonable, non-defamatory interpretation of the cartoon, the Superior Court had been correct in ruling there was no libel committed and dismissing the case.

== Effects of the decision ==
Although this decision was binding precedent only in the Second District (Note: Los Angeles, San Luis Obispo, Santa Barbara, and Ventura Counties) of California state courts, it has been influential. It has been cited multiple times by other judicial opinions, including by other California appellate courts, by state courts from Colorado, Illinois, Massachusetts, and New York and by Federal District Courts.

== See also ==
- Editorial cartoon
- Pulitzer Prize for Editorial Cartooning
