= David V. Picker =

American film executive and producer (1931–2019)

- Born: David Victor Picker; May 14, 1931; New York City, U.S.
- Died: April 20, 2019 (aged 87); New York City, U.S.
- Occupations: Movie executive and producer
- Known for: Served as President and CEO of United Artists, Paramount, Lorimar, and Columbia Pictures
- Family: Arnold Picker (uncle); Tobias Picker (nephew)

David Victor Picker (May 14, 1931 – April 20, 2019) was an American motion picture executive and producer, working in the film industry for more than forty years. He served as president and chief executive officer for United Artists, Paramount, Lorimar, and Columbia Pictures before becoming an independent producer. Picker was a member of the Writers Guild of America East, a member the Producers Guild of America, and he was Chairman Emeritus of the Producers Guild of America East. Picker's memoir about his career in the film industry, Musts, Maybes and Nevers, was released in 2013.

== Early life ==
Picker was born to a Jewish family on May 14, 1931, in New York City. He was the son of Sylvia (Moses) and Eugene Picker, a one-time president of Loews Theatres and president of the National Association of Theatre Owners, executive of Trans-Lux and vice-president of United Artists. He attended Dartmouth College and graduated with a Bachelor of Arts degree in 1953.

== Film career ==
=== 1950s–1969 ===
Picker began his movie career at United Artists in 1956, working in advertising and publicity. By 1961 he was an assistant to Arthur Krim, the president. In 1962, at age 31, he was named head of marketing and production at UA. Picker helped bring Tom Jones to United Artists in 1963. The film received four Academy Awards, including Best Picture and Best Director for Tony Richardson. In 1964, Picker accepted the award on behalf of Tony Richardson, who was not in attendance. By the late 1960s, Picker was managing United Artists Records.

=== 1969–1973: United Artists Corporation ===
Picker became chief operating officer and president of United Artists Corporation in 1969. Having earlier brought the Beatles' A Hard Day's Night and Help! to the company, Picker was also responsible for a deal with producers Harry Saltzman and Albert Broccoli for the James Bond series which launched one of the most successful franchises in cinema history. Other notable releases during his time as president of United Artists included Midnight Cowboy and Last Tango in Paris. Picker also established the company's lasting relationship with writer and director Woody Allen, in addition to European filmmakers Federico Fellini, Ingmar Bergman, François Truffaut, Louis Malle, and Sergio Leone. He became CEO and president of UA on January 1, 1973.

=== 1973–1993 ===
In 1973, Picker left United Artists to form his own production company, Two Roads Productions, producing Juggernaut and Lenny in 1974 and Smile and Royal Flash in 1975. Lenny was a critical success, nominated for six Academy Awards. However, his next picture, Won Ton Ton: The Dog Who Saved Hollywood, became a notorious flop.

In 1976, Picker became President of Motion Pictures at Paramount, but served for only a few years, during which he helped develop or greenlight Saturday Night Fever, Grease, and the 1980 Academy Award winner, Ordinary People. Upon leaving Paramount in 1979, Picker partnered with comedian Steve Martin to produce that year's The Jerk, Dead Men Don't Wear Plaid in 1982, and The Man with Two Brains in 1983. In the mid-1980s, Picker took over as President of Feature Films at Lorimar Productions, developing and supervising the films S.O.B., Being There, and Escape to Victory. In 1984, he worked with Harry Belafonte to produce Beat Street Hired in 1986 by Columbia Pictures to serve as president of production, Picker greenlit Hope and Glory, School Daze, Vice Versa, Punchline, and True Believer. In 1987, Picker left Columbia after Chairman & CEO David Puttnam exited the company and Dawn Steel joined it. He revived Two Roads Productions with a non-exclusive production agreement with Columbia. His next film, a remake of Stella Dallas called Stella, starred Bette Midler.

=== 1993 to 2000s ===
Picker produced The Saint of Fort Washington for Warner Bros. in 1993, and The Crucible for Twentieth Century Fox in 1996. In 1997, Picker became president of Hallmark Entertainment Productions Worldwide to oversee the company's objective of expanding into feature films. In that capacity, he became Executive Producer on a host of TV movies and miniseries, including Journey to the Center of the Earth, David Copperfield, and Hans Christian Andersen: My Life as a Fairytale.

From 2004 to 2008, Picker served as chairman of The Producers Guild of America for the East. Picker's memoir about his career in the film industry, Musts, Maybes and Nevers, was released in 2013.

== Personal life and death ==
Picker was married three times. In 1954, he married Caryl Schlossman, with whom he had two daughters, Caryn and Pam. In 1975, he married casting director Nessa Hyams; he produced and she directed the feature film Leader of the Band, released in 1987. In 1995 Picker married photographer Sandra Jetton, who survived him. They lived in New York City.

Picker's sister is Jean Picker Firstenberg, past CEO and Director of the American Film Institute. His uncle, Arnold Picker, was also an executive vice-president at United Artists.

On April 20, 2019, Picker died in New York City from colon cancer at the age of 87. He was survived by his wife, Sandra, his two daughters and his sister.

== Selected filmography ==
He was a producer in all films unless otherwise noted.

=== Film ===
Year	Film	Credit	Notes
1974	Juggernaut	Executive producer	
1974	Lenny	Executive producer	
1975	Smile	Executive producer	
1975	Royal Flash		
1976	Won Ton Ton, the Dog Who Saved Hollywood		
1978	The One and Only		
1978	Oliver's Story		
1979	Bloodline		
1979	The Jerk		
1982	Dead Men Don't Wear Plaid		
1983	The Man with Two Brains		
1984	Beat Street		
1984	The Goodbye People		
1987	Leader of the Band		
1990	Stella	Executive producer	
1991	Livin' Large!		
1992	Traces of Red		
1992	Leap of Faith		
1993	The Saint of Fort Washington		
1996	The Crucible		Final film as a producer

Thanks

Year	Film	Role
1975	Lisztomania	Very special thanks
1980	Rascal Dazzle	Special thanks

=== Television ===
Year	Title	Credit	Notes
1998	The Temptations	Executive producer	Television film
1998	Rear Window	Executive producer	Television film
1999	P. T. Barnum	Executive producer	Television film
1999	Journey to the Center of the Earth	Executive producer	
1999	Aftershock: Earthquake in New York	Executive producer	Television film
2000	Back to the Secret Garden	Executive producer	Television film
2000	In the Beginning	Executive producer	Television film
2000	David Copperfield	Executive producer	Television film
2002	Fidel	Executive producer	Television film
2003	Hans Christian Andersen: My Life as a Fairytale	Executive producer	Television film

Miscellaneous crew

Year	Title	Role
1996	Arliss	Consultant
