= Alexander Barkan =

American politician (1909–1990)

Alexander E. Barkan (August 9, 1909 – October 18, 1990) was head of the AFL-CIO's Committee on Political Education from 1963 until 1982. During the Watergate hearings, it became known that Barkan was one of the original members of Nixon's Enemies List.

== Early life and education ==
Born in Bayonne, New Jersey, Barkan claimed to have started voting at the age of 15 or 16 -- voting 20 to 25 times an election because the judges were controlled by Frank Hague, the Democratic mayor of Jersey City, N.J. He attained degrees in political science and economics from the University of Chicago in 1933.

== Career ==
He taught high school English at night in Bayonne and became actively involved in labor unions right after college. In 1937 he left teaching to work as a full-time volunteer with the Textile Workers Organizing Committee. During World War II he served on the USS Alabama as a radioman. He was fond of relating how he delivered all the votes on USS Alabama for F.D.R. After the war he returned to New Jersey as a staff member of the Textile Workers Union.

In 1955, with the merger of the American Federation of Labor and the Congress of Industrial Organization Mr. Barkan became assistant director of the AFL-CIO's political arm, COPE. He was appointed director by George Meany in 1966 giving him a major say in the distribution of a substantial amount of money and number of volunteers, which gave him major influence in the Democratic Party. He was also known as a gifted orator and tireless union advocate. Al, as he was generally known was well respected by his friends and enemies alike for his accomplishments, integrity, and directness. Lane Kirkland, president of the A.F.L.-C.I.O. said of him "Al Barkan was one of labor's most dedicated and most unforgettable stalwarts. Few achieve the rank of legend, but Al did. He left an indelible memory with all of us and his work inspired more than one generation of trade unionists to continue their work 'on to victory.'" Mr. Barkan often used "on to victory" to rally his troops in electing pro union candidates.

A lifelong supporter of the Democratic Party, in 1972 he denounced George McGovern and his followers for turning the party into the "party of acid, amnesty, and abortion." His obituary in the New York Times would note, "His outspoken, crusty manner and opposition to party changes intended to benefit minorities and women alienated many Democrats." His opposition to Democratic Party reforms intended to broaden representation prompted him in 1972 to declare, "We aren't going to let these Harvard-Berkeley Camelots take over our party."

Barkan retired in 1981 but stayed involved visiting and speaking to labor union groups almost until the end of his life.

== Personal life ==
Barkan died in 1990, survived at that time by his wife of 46 years, Helen Stickno, his daughters, Lois Wolkowitz and Carol Alt and four grandchildren, Matthew Alt, Allyson Alt, Rachel Wolkowitz Mack, and Jacob Wolkowitz.
