= Harrison Dogole =

American private detective

- Born: Saul Harrison Dogole; 16 January 1922
- Died: 13 December 1999 (aged 77); Wellington, Florida, United States
- Other name: Sonny

Saul Harrison "Sonny" Dogole (16 January 1922 – 13 December 1999) was a business executive. Dogole was president of Globe Security Systems, in Philadelphia. Globe was a major private detective agency in the United States.

He was a heavy contributor to the Hubert Humphrey campaign, and because of fears that he would use his company to investigate Richard M. Nixon, as a result, he was placed on Nixon's Enemies List.

Dogole retired in 1989 and died in Wellington, Florida.
