= Nuclear energy =

Nuclear energy may refer to:

- Nuclear power, the use of sustained nuclear fission or nuclear fusion to generate heat and electricity
- Nuclear reactor, the device used to sustain a controlled fission nuclear chain reaction
- Nuclear binding energy, the energy needed to fuse or split a nucleus of an atom
- Nuclear potential energy, the potential energy of the particles inside an atomic nucleus
- Nuclear Energy (sculpture), a bronze sculpture by Henry Moore in the University of Chicago
