= Jean Firstenberg =

American executive

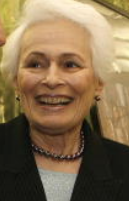
- Born: Jean Picker Firstenberg
- Education: Boston University (BA)
- Occupations: President and CEO of the American Film Institute

Jean Picker Firstenberg is an American who served as the president and CEO of the American Film Institute from 1980 through 2007. She was the Institute's second CEO and the only female to have held that title. At the time of her appointment, she was an executive at the Markle Foundation.

== Early life and education ==
Firstenberg is the daughter of Eugene Picker, former president of Loew's movie theaters, and sister of David V. Picker, former head of production for United Artists.

== Education ==
Firstenberg graduated from Boston University's College of Communications.

== Career ==
Before AFI, Firstenberg worked as a program officer at the John and Mary R. Markle Foundation in New York City. She also served as director of Princeton University's publications office. She also chaired the University of Georgia's Peabody Awards Committee. She also served on the Executive Committee of the Women's Sports Foundation.

Firstenberg served as president and CEO of the American Film Institute from 1980 to 2007. Upon her retirement from AFI, Firstenberg received an AFI Life Achievement Award for service to the institute and was named president emerita and a lifetime trustee. During her years at AFI she saw the institute gaining the campus of Immaculate Heart College in Los Angeles and to the AFI Conservatory being accredited by both the National Association of Schools of Art and Design and the Accrediting Committee of Senior Colleges and Universities of the Western Association of Schools and Colleges; to AFI's embrace of digital technology, and to the opening of the AFI Silver Theatre and Cultural Center.

She also saw the AFI move away from the film preservation business, and in 2002, the institute attempted to enter the market for pre-Oscar awards ceremonies and found their televised show poorly attended, lacking in stars and discontinued due to low ratings. Firstenberg saw the relaunch of the AFI Catalog of Feature Films and the launch of the AFI Los Angeles International Film Festival.

Firstenberg is a member of the California State University Board of Trustees

== Books ==
Firstenberg has been involved with two books about the AFI. In 2017, BECOMING AFI: 50 Years Inside the American Film Institute, written with James Hindman, was published. The book covers the history of the AFI and how it evolved from 1965 to the present. In 2014, she edited THE AFI CONSERVATORY: Toni Vellani on the Practice of Filmmaking compiled by Gary Winick, AFI Class of 1986.
