= Arthur Krock =

American newspaper correspondent and columnist

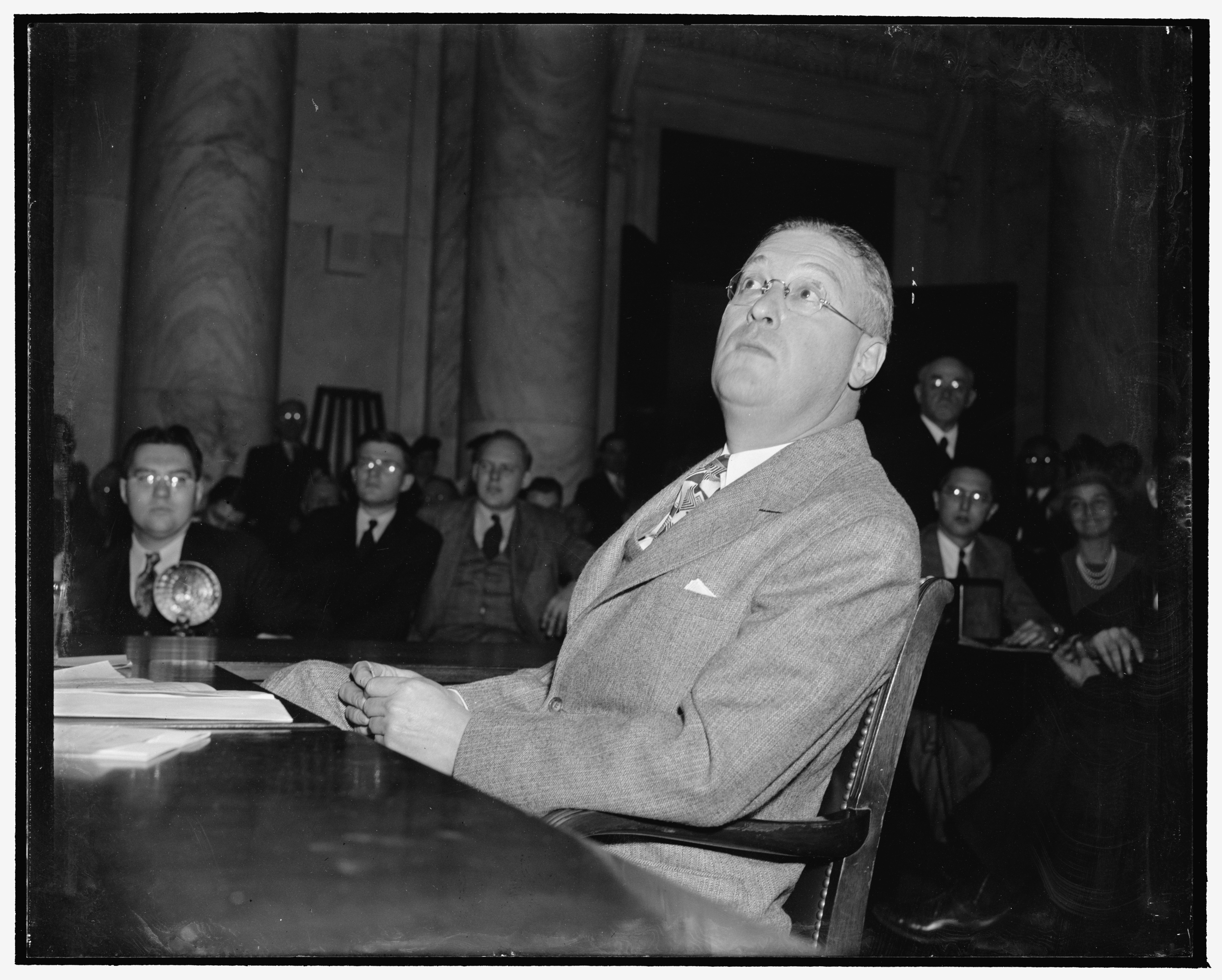
- Krock in 1939
- Born: November 16, 1886; Glasgow, Kentucky, U.S.
- Died: April 12, 1974 (aged 87); Washington, D.C., U.S.
- Resting place: Oak Hill Cemetery
- Education: Lewis Institute
- Occupation: Journalist
- Known for: "In the Nation" column (The New York Times)
- Spouse(s): Marguerite Pollys (first), Martha Granger Blair (second)
- Children: 3 sons
- Parent(s): Joseph Krock, Caroline Morris
- Awards: Presidential Medal of Freedom; Pulitzer Prize (1935, 1938, 1951)

Arthur Bernard Krock (November 16, 1886 – April 12, 1974) was a Pulitzer Prize-winning American journalist. He became known as the "Dean of Washington newsmen" in a career that spanned the tenure of 11 United States presidents.

== Early life and career ==
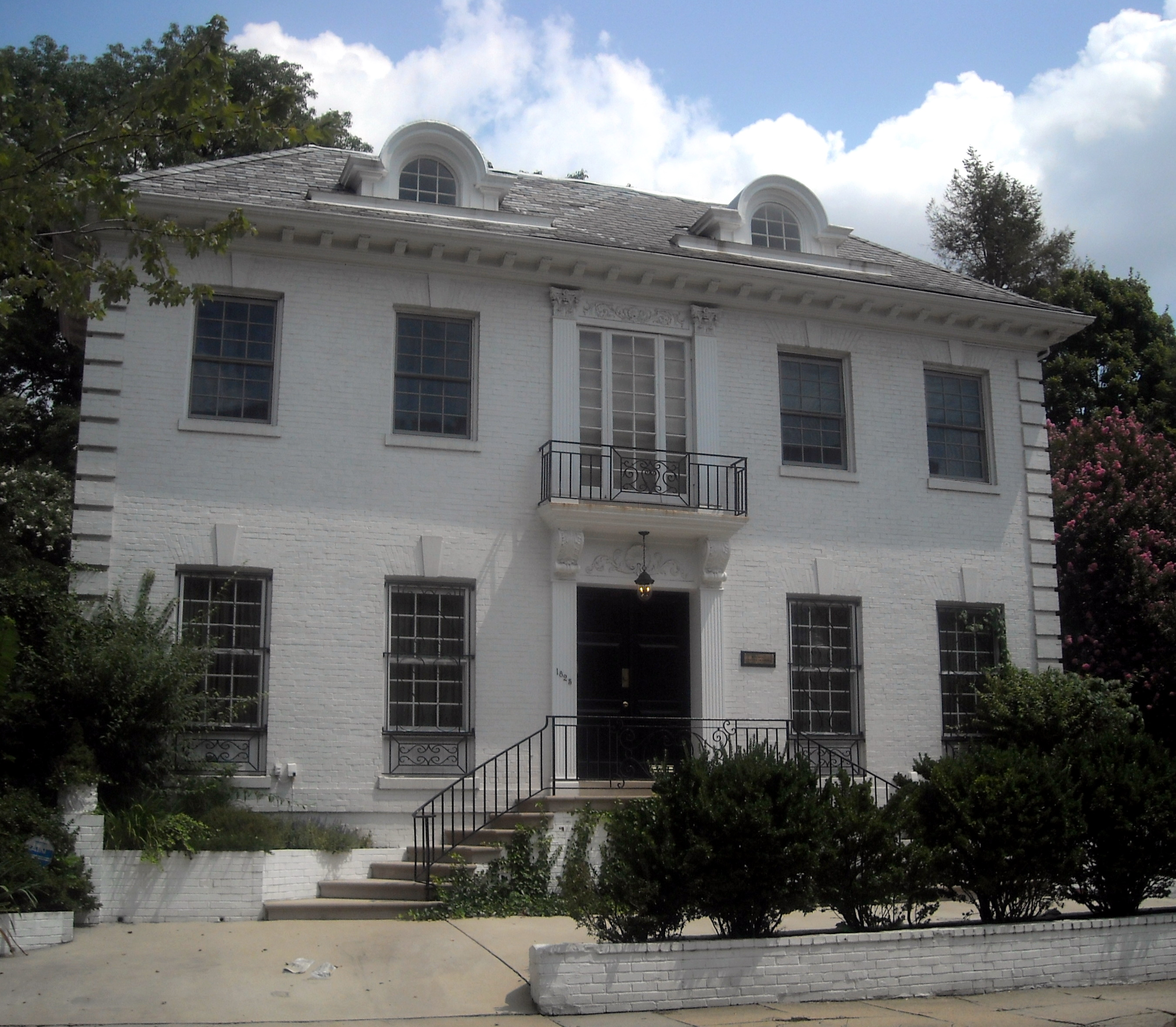
Arthur Krock's former residence in Washington, DC

Arthur Krock was born in Glasgow, Kentucky, in 1887. He was the son of German-Jewish bookkeeper Joseph Krock and Caroline Morris, who was half-Jewish. After his mother became blind, Krock was raised by his grandparents, Emmanuel and Henrietta Morris, until he was six years old. When his mother regained her sight, he joined his parents in Chicago, graduating from high school there in 1904.

Krock went on to Princeton University but dropped out in his first year for lack of money. He returned home, and in 1906 graduated with an associate degree from the Lewis Institute in Chicago.

== Journalism ==
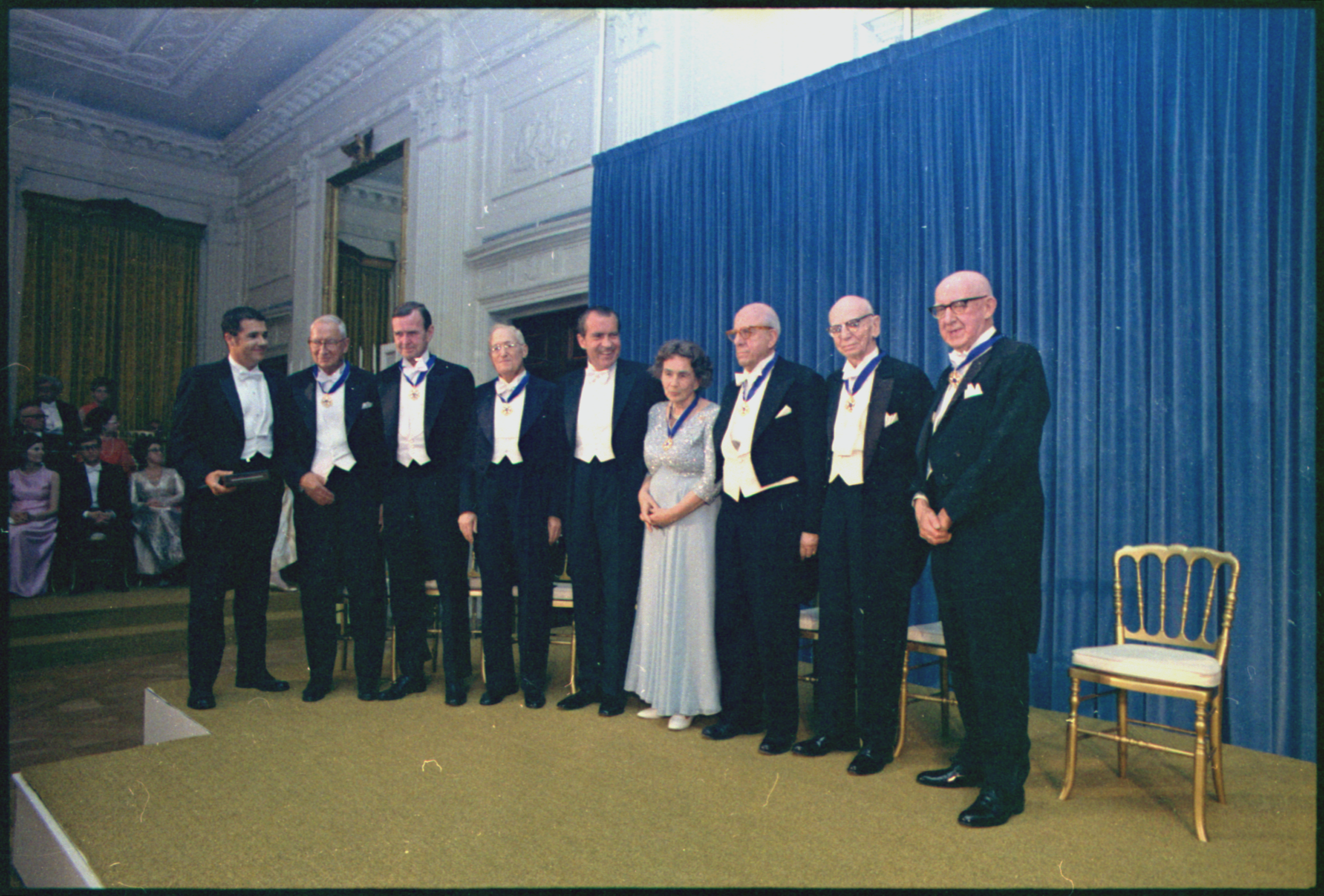
Krock, fourth from the left in this image, accepts the Presidential Medal of Freedom from President Richard Nixon on April 22, 1970.

Krock began his career in journalism with the Louisville Herald, then went to Washington as a correspondent for the Louisville Times and Louisville Courier-Journal. In 1927, he joined The New York Times and soon became its Washington correspondent and bureau chief. His column, "In the Nation", was noted for its opinions on public policy.

For example, amid the Hiss–Chambers and Coplon spy cases and the investigation of David E. Lilienthal's management of the U.S. Atomic Energy Commission, Krock observed:

The persons whose names have entered the trials and investigations, fairly and unfairly, include none who was affiliated with the Republican party ... The ideal solution from the standpoint of these strategists [President Truman's] would be: (1) the acquittal of Hiss ... (2) a find by the Joint Congressional Committee on Atomic Energy that Lilienthal has been a good manager ... (3) repudiation by public opinion of the more sensational testimony before the third Un-American Committee; (4) at least one substantial trial victory for the Department of Justice. This is a large order. But the deep-thinking Democratic politicos think there is a good chance for it.

In the mid-1930s, Krock became a friend and staunch advocate of Joseph P. Kennedy and his ambitions. Historian David Nasaw wrote that the journalist seemed to be all but in the pocket of the powerful millionaire (whose second son would become U.S. president while two others would contend for the office). In a 2012 biography of Joe Kennedy, Nasaw wrote that the Krock-Kennedy correspondence "reveals something quite disturbing, if not corrupt, about Krock's willingness to do Kennedy's bidding, to advise him or write a speech for him, then praise it in his column..." At his urging, Krock agreed to write the introduction to his son Senator Robert F. Kennedy's book about organized crime, entitled The Enemy Within.

In October 1963, less than two months before the assassination of Joe Kennedy's son, President John F. Kennedy, Krock wrote a column headlined "The Intra-Administration War in Vietnam" in which he quoted a high-ranking government official:

The CIA's growth was 'likened to a malignancy' which the 'very high official was not even sure the White House could control ... any longer.' 'If the United States ever experiences [an attempted coup to overthrow the Government] it will come from the CIA and not the Pentagon. The agency 'represents a tremendous power and total unaccountability to anyone.'

== Awards ==
Over his 60-year career, Krock won three Pulitzer Prizes:

- 1935 Pulitzer Prize for Correspondence, for his Washington dispatches
- 1938 Prize for Correspondence, for "his exclusive authorized interview with the President of the United States on February 27, 1937."
- 1951 Special Citation of his exclusive interview with President Truman

The organization now explains the special Pulitzer thus: "The Advisory Board on the Pulitzer Prizes as a policy does not make any award to an individual member of the Board. In 1951, the Board decided that the outstanding instance of National Reporting done in 1950 was the exclusive interview with President Truman obtained by Arthur Krock of The New York Times, while Mr. Krock was a Board member. The Board therefore made no award in the National Reporting category."

He was awarded a French citation for his coverage of the Versailles Peace Conference.

On April 22, 1970, he was presented with the Presidential Medal of Freedom by President Richard Nixon.

== Personal life ==
He was married twice, first to Marguerite Polleys, daughter of a Minneapolis railroad official, from 1911 to her death following a long illness in 1938. They had one son, Thomas, who, during the Spanish Civil War, was one of a handful of Americans who fought in the war on the side of Francisco Franco. In 1939, he wed Martha Granger Blair of Chicago, a divorced society columnist for the Washington Times-Herald, who had two sons. He died on April 12, 1974. He was buried in Oak Hill Cemetery.

== Authored works ==
- Foreword to Kennedy, Robert F. (1960). The Enemy Within. Harper & Row.
- In the Nation: 1932-1966. McGraw-Hill. 1966.
- Memoirs; Sixty Years on the Firing Line. Funk & Wagnalls. 1968.
- The Consent of the Governed, and Other Deceits. Little, Brown & Company. 1971.
- Myself When Young; Growing Up in the 1890's. Little, Brown & Company. 1973.
