= The Enemy Within (Kennedy book) =

1960 book by Robert F. Kennedy

- Cover of the 1994 edition
- Author: Robert F. Kennedy
- Language: English
- Genre: Non-fiction
- Published: 1960

The Enemy Within: The McClellan Committee's Crusade Against Jimmy Hoffa and Corrupt Labor Unions is a book by American politician Robert F. Kennedy (assisted by John Seigenthaler) first published in 1960, and republished in 1994. As Robert Kennedy was intimately involved, the book is somewhat autobiographical. At the urging of Kennedy's father Joe Kennedy Sr., the journalist Arthur Krock agreed to write the introduction. Edwin Guthman, chairman of the Robert F. Kennedy Memorial provided the introduction to the 1994 edition.

== Content ==
The work details events and information uncovered between 1956 and 1959 by the United States Senate Select Committee on Improper Activities in Labor and Management in which Kennedy served as chief counsel. The book focuses on corruption, crime and graft within American labor unions, with an emphasis on International Brotherhood of Teamsters, as well as union busting by employers. Kennedy describes the Teamsters as the most powerful institution in the United States aside the United States Government itself (1994, p. 161). According to Robert Kennedy, George Meany, former president of the AFL–CIO, has called Jimmy Hoffa organized labor's No. 1 Enemy (1994, p. 161).

Kennedy considered that organized crime had developed unchecked into a force of extraordinary power, even threatening the authority of the US government itself. He described organized crime as "a menacing enemy within our national economic framework". He singled out the Teamsters in particular, which he labeled the "most powerful institution in this country—aside from the United States Government itself". The book is a call to action against organized crime and suggests that government employ greater resources to fight against it, he concludes "if we do not attack organized criminals with weapons and techniques as effective as their own, they will destroy us".

In 1961, Twentieth Century Fox bought the film rights to The Enemy Within. Budd Schulberg wrote a script and Jerry Wald was set to produce, however the film never came to be as the studio was concerned that the Teamsters truck drivers would refuse to transport the film tape to the theaters. Later Columbia Pictures picked up the project but they too backed out after William Bufalino, Hoffa's attorney, wrote a letter to the studio pointing out why Twentieth Century Fox had abandoned the project.
