= Edwin O. Guthman =

American journalist

- Born: August 11, 1919; Seattle, Washington, U.S.
- Died: August 31, 2008 (aged 89); New York City, U.S.
- Education: University of Washington (BA)
- Occupations: Journalist; Professor
- Children: 4
- Military service
- Allegiance: United States of America
- Branch: United States Army
- Service years: 1942–1946
- Rank: Captain
- Awards: Silver Star Purple Heart

Edwin O. Guthman (August 11, 1919 – August 31, 2008) was an American journalist and university professor. While at the Seattle Times, he won the paper's first Pulitzer Prize for National Reporting in 1950. Guthman was the third individual listed on Richard Nixon's "Enemies List."

== Early life and education ==
Guthman was born in Seattle, Washington, graduating from the University of Washington in 1941. He was of Jewish descent.

== Career ==
=== Military ===
Guthman entered the Army in 1942. During World War II, he served as an infantry regiment reconnaissance platoon leader in both North Africa and Italy. In 1946, he was discharged as a captain. During his tour, he was awarded the Silver Star and Purple Heart.

=== Journalism ===
Guthman was a reporter for the Seattle Star (1941–1947), and The Seattle Times (1947–1961). While at the Seattle Times, he won the paper's first Pulitzer Prize for National Reporting in 1950. His articles provided evidence that the Washington State Un-American Activities Committee suppressed evidence that cleared University of Washington professor Melvin Rader of false charges of being a Communist.

In 1961, he was tapped by Attorney General Robert F. Kennedy to be his press secretary. He later served in a similar position for one year when Kennedy became U.S. Senator from New York in 1965. As a result of his work with Kennedy, he was third on Nixon's Enemies List. He provided the introduction to the 1994 edition of Kennedy's 1960 book The Enemy Within.

He was the national editor for the Los Angeles Times from 1965 to 1977 and then the editorial page editor for The Philadelphia Inquirer (1977–1987).

=== Academia ===
Guthman was a senior lecturer at the USC Annenberg School for Communication at the University of Southern California in Los Angeles, California, where he had been a professor since 1987. He retired in 2007.

== Personal life ==
Guthman died August 31, 2008, at his home in the Pacific Palisades neighborhood of Los Angeles, at the age of 89. He suffered from amyloidosis, a rare disease that attacks the internal organs. He was interred at Hillside Memorial Park. He was survived by his four children: Les Guthman, Eddie Guthman, Gary Guthman, and Diane Cancino.

== Authored works ==
- We Band of Brothers: A Memoir of Robert F. Kennedy. Harper & Row. 1971.
- (edited by Guthman and Jeffrey Shulman) Robert Kennedy in His Own Words: The Unpublished Recollections of the Kennedy Years. Bantam Press. 1988.
- Introduction to 1994 edition; Kennedy, Robert F. (1960). The Enemy Within. Harper & Row.
