= George T. Bell =

- Born: January 21, 1913
- Died: March 4, 1973 (aged 60); Washington, D.C.

George T. Bell (January 21, 1913 – March 4, 1973) was a former special assistant to President Richard Nixon. He wrote the Nixon's Enemies List compiled by Charles Colson.

== Career ==
Before joining the President's staff, Bell worked for General Electric and was later President of Geonautics, Inc., an engineering research company.

When questioned about Nixon's infamous "enemies list," Colson told the House Subcommittee Investigating the Watergate scandal that the "late George Bell" was responsible for the master list of Nixon political opponents.

== Personal life ==
Bell died in Washington, D.C., following a long illness.
