= Arnold Picker =

American film producer

Arnold M. Picker
- Born: September 29, 1913; New York City, U.S.
- Died: October 11, 1989 (aged 76); Boston, Massachusetts, U.S.
- Occupations: Movie executive and politician
- Spouse: Ruth Cohen (m. 1957)
- Children: 2
- Family: David Picker (nephew)

Arnold M. Picker (September 29, 1913 – October 11, 1989) was a United States film industry executive, mayor of Golden Beach, Florida and the number one enemy on Nixon's Enemies List.

== Early life and education ==
Picker was born in New York City. He had two brothers, Eugene Picker (father of David Picker) and Sidney Picker. He was of Jewish descent. Picker attended the City College of New York and the London School of Economics.

== Career ==
Picker began his career by following in his father's footsteps. In 1935, he started with Columbia Pictures, where his father had been an executive, and later became head of international distribution. He then joined United Artists where his nephew, future UA president David worked, and in 1961 he was made an executive vice president in charge of all production. His brother Eugene joined UA the same year. His motion picture career ended and political career began when President Lyndon B. Johnson named him to the International Commission on Education and Cultural Affairs.

In 1972, Picker served as the finance chairman of Senator Edmund Muskie's presidential campaign and in 1976 he worked as a top fundraiser for Henry M. Jackson's campaign. Picker was singled out by President Richard M. Nixon's reelection strategists as the top target of a list of 20 people on Nixon's Enemies List. This list came to light during the Watergate scandal. Picker was elected mayor of Golden Beach, Florida, in 1979.

Although his career in the motion picture industry ended in the 1960s, Picker continued to be an active force in the field. He helped establish the Washington-based American Film Institute. He later served as chairman of the board of the National Center for Jewish Film. The center at Brandeis University is dedicated to restoring Yiddish film classics. He also helped found the Holocaust Documentation and Education Center based at Florida International University.

== Personal life ==
In 1957, he married Ruth Cohen; they had two daughters, Carol Picker Frank and Phyllis Picker Dessner. Picker died of pneumonia at New England Deaconess Hospital in Boston.
