= Nuclear Energy (sculpture) =

Sculpture by Henry Moore (LH 526, University of Chicago)

Coordinates: 41.7925°N 87.6011°W

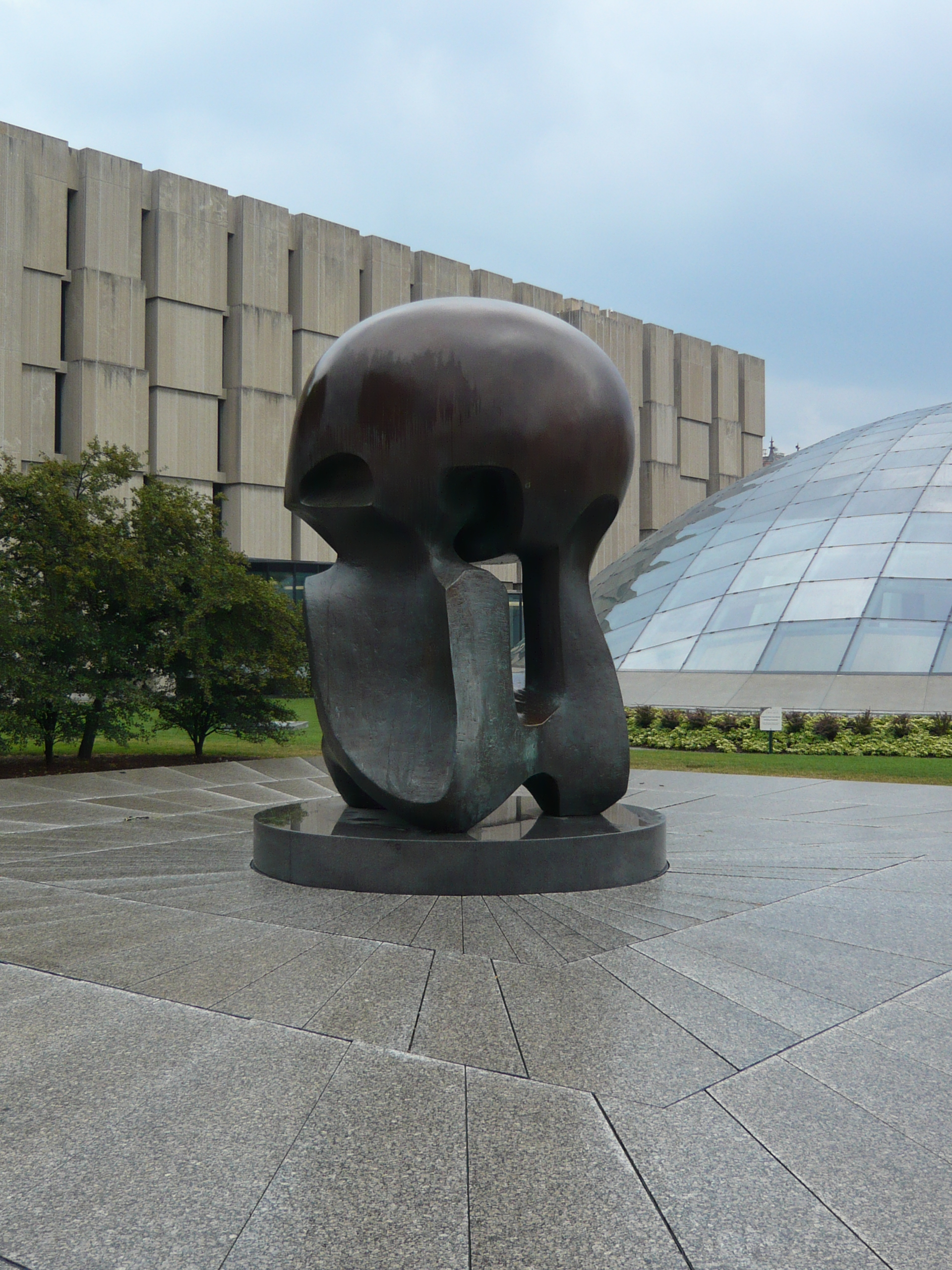
- Artist: Henry Moore
- Year: 1964–1966
- Catalogue: LH 526
- Type: Bronze
- Dimensions: Divergent measurements exist; see text
- Location: University of Chicago (outdoor) at the former site of the Stagg Field west stands rackets court, Chicago, Illinois

Nuclear Energy (1964–1966) (LH 526) is a bronze sculpture by Henry Moore on the campus of the University of Chicago at the site of the world's first nuclear reactor, Chicago Pile-1. The first human-made self-sustaining nuclear chain reaction was created here on December 2, 1942. The sculpture is set in a granite paved quadrangle, with the paving stones radiating outward from the sculpture, and memorial plaques mounted on an adjacent wall. The memorial site is a National Historic Landmark and Chicago Landmark.

== Location ==
Nuclear Energy is on Ellis Avenue, between the Max Palevsky West dormitory and the Mansueto Library in the Hyde Park community area of Chicago. It sits on a square, granite paved, concrete platform at the spot where the Manhattan Project team built a nuclear reactor to produce the first self-sustaining controlled nuclear reaction, under the now-demolished west stands of the old Stagg Field.

== History ==
The sculpture was commissioned by the B. F. Ferguson monument fund. In 1973, Henry Moore was quoted in Art Journal as saying:

It's a rather strange thing really but I'd already done the idea for this sculpture before Professor McNeill and his colleagues from the University of Chicago came to see me on Sunday morning to tell me about the whole proposition. They told me (which I'd only vaguely known) that Fermi, the Italian nuclear physicist, started or really made the first successful controlled nuclear fission in a temporary building. I think it was a squash court – a wooden building – which from the outside looked entirely unlike where a thing of such an important nature might take place. But this experiment was carried on in secret and it meant that by being successful Man was able to control this huge force for peaceful purposes as well as destructive ones. They came to me to tell me that they thought where such an important event in history took place ought to be marked and they wondered whether I would do a sculpture which would stand on the spot. (Art Journal, New York, spring 1973, p.286)

The sculpture is described as 14.0 feet (4.3 m) in height and 8 feet (2.4 m) in diameter by the Smithsonian Institution and it sits atop a base that is 1.5 feet (0.46 m) in height and 10 feet (3.0 m) in diameter. However, the University of Chicago says it is only 12 feet (3.7 m) in height. The Henry Moore Foundation lists its height at 3.66m.

The sculpture was erected for and dedicated at the celebration of the 25th anniversary of the initiation of the first self-sustaining controlled nuclear reaction by Enrico Fermi on December 2, 1942. It was unveiled at precisely 3:36 p.m. on December 2, 1967. The site of the first nuclear reaction was designated as a National Historic Landmark on February 18, 1965. Along with three other Chicago locations, it was one of the original places included when the National Register of Historic Places (NRHP) launched on October 15, 1966. The site was named a Chicago Landmark on October 27, 1971. Four plaques on a nearby granite wall mark the site. The oldest was originally placed in 1947 on the wall of the old stadium, while the other plaques mark the installation of the sculpture and the historic designations of the site.

A working model for Nuclear Energy ("Atom Piece (Working Model for Nuclear Energy) 1964–65") is on display at the Hiroshima City Museum of Contemporary Art, Japan. "Atom Piece" (Working Model for Nuclear Energy) can also be found at the Hakone Open-Air Museum.

== Themes ==
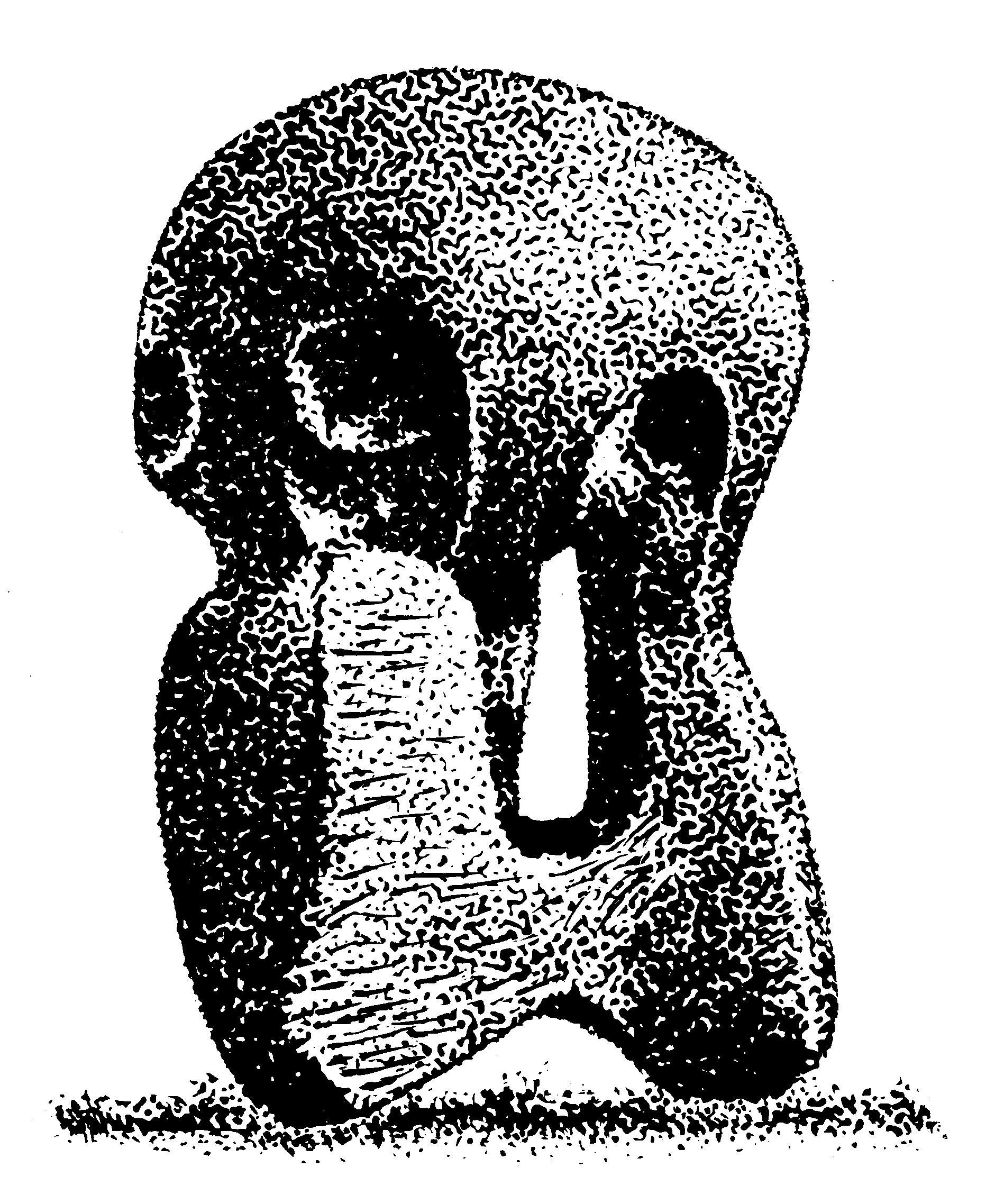
Line drawing of Nuclear Energy

Moore cited a number of inspirations for the sculpture, from earlier works with similar forms to natural objects like stones. About the shape of the sculpture, Moore said:

When I had made this working model I showed it to them and they liked my idea because the top of it is like some large mushroom, or a kind of mushroom cloud. Also it has a kind of head shape like the top of the skull but down below is more an architectural cathedral. One might think of the lower part of it being a protective form and constructed for human beings and the top being more like the idea of the destructive side of the atom. So between the two it might express to people in a symbolic way the whole event. (Henry Moore quoted in Art Journal, New York, Spring 1973, p.286)

Moore's work explores the hopes and fears of the Atomic Age. The potential of controlled nuclear power or a nuclear holocaust is tied to the historical events of the site with the iconography of a mushroom cloud or skull, supported by pillars topped by arches like a protective cathedral. Interviews with Moore highlight the dual nature of the top and bottom portions of the sculpture, meant to represent the creative and destructive power possible with nuclear energy. An abstract sculpture was chosen by the University to highlight the importance of the events at the site, and their implications for humanity, rather than the importance of Fermi in bringing them about.

== Reception ==
A miniature preliminary cast of the sculpture, entitled Atom Piece, was presented to critics and University of Chicago faculty early. Critics at the Tate Gallery in London were unsure of its meaning; some saw it as complex for combining an optimism about nuclear power with the fear of nuclear destruction, while others found it heavy-handed for alluding to a mushroom cloud or deformed skull directly. The University of Chicago committee, upon viewing a photograph of the work, was concerned with how the monument would influence public interpretations of Fermi's work there, and the University's role in an age of nuclear proliferation. William H. McNeill, the professor who spearheaded the effort to procure the sculpture, consented to purchase the work entitled Atom Piece. However, before unveiling, the name was changed to Nuclear Energy to avoid an objectionable similarity with the phrase 'atom peace'.

The form of the sculpture and its mixed reviews were enough to capture media attention. Chicago Sun-Times reporter Burnell Heinecke interviewed Moore and faculty members in 1965, writing:

Reports from the faculty indicate humanists have viewed the model as powerful and awe-inspiring, while nuclear physicists consider it threatening and frightening and militaristic ... Prof. Harold Haydon, one of three members of the committee which selected Moore, observed: "Mr. Moore's work will be subject to many interpretations. Certainly it represents a kind of contained power and force. To me, it represents the challenges confronting mankind in the nuclear age—the challenges of a force that can be used to create or to destroy."

Recent critics such as James Purdon have situated the monument in historical context as a marker of the beginning of the nuclear age, praised its ability to make the discovery tangible to the viewer, and tracked its relevance to "connected contemporary anxieties" such as the Fukushima Daiichi nuclear disaster.

The British conceptual artist Simon Starling's Project for a Masquerade (Hiroshima) tells the story of Moore's Nuclear Energy, focusing on the working model in Hiroshima and the full-scale work in Chicago, and the different meaning the work carries in the two places. The work consists of eight masks, each simultaneously representing a figure in the story of the Moore sculpture and in the sixteenth-century Noh play Eboshi-ori.

== See also ==
- Chain Reaction
- List of sculptures by Henry Moore
- List of public art in Chicago
