= Richard Nixon's enemies list =

Major political opponents to US president

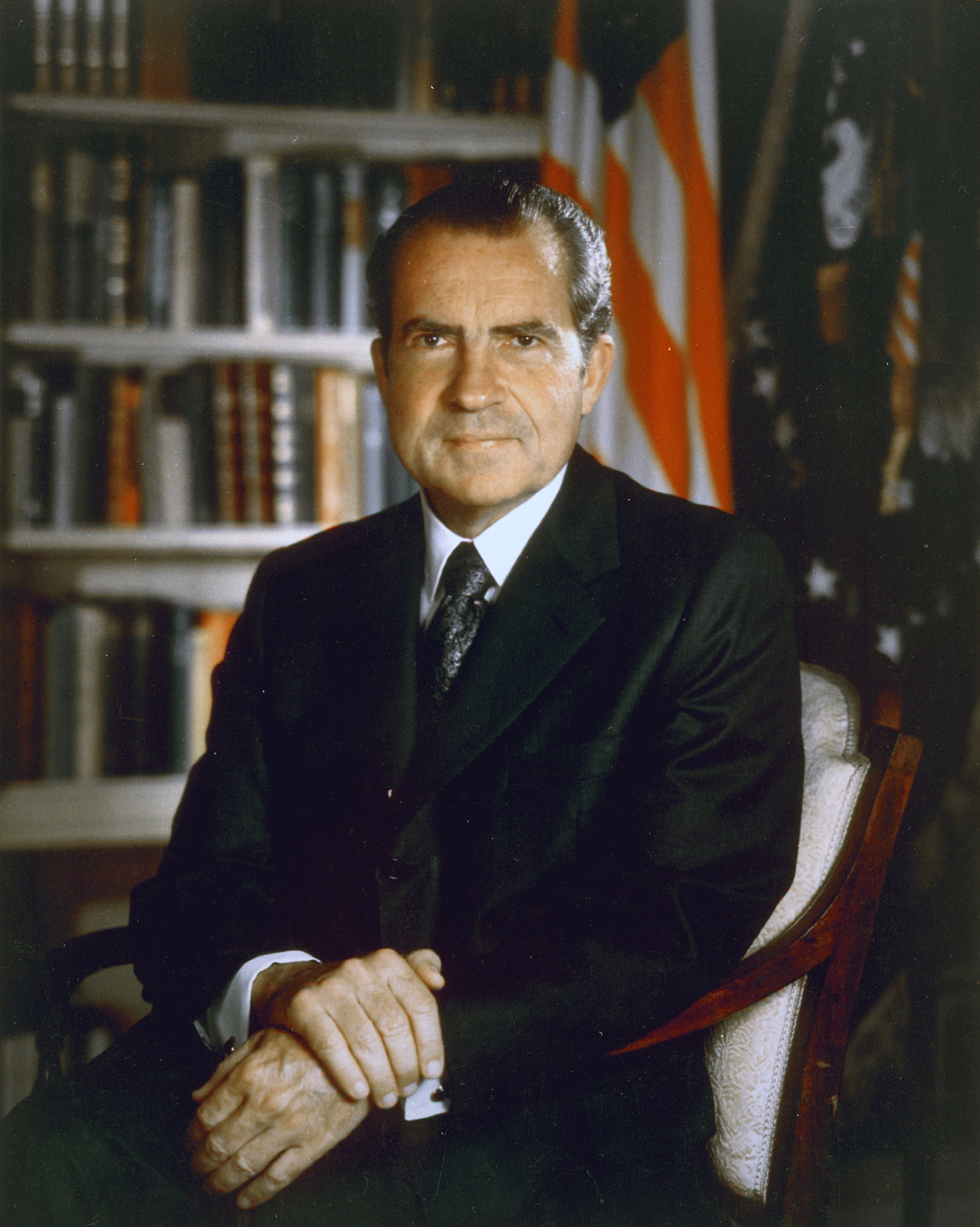
President Richard Nixon's Official Presidential Photograph, taken in 1971

Richard Nixon's enemies list refers to a compilation of major political opponents to Richard Nixon, the president of the United States from 1969 until his resignation in 1974, that was assembled by Charles Colson and written by George T. Bell (assistant to Colson, special counsel to the White House), and sent in memorandum form to John Dean on September 9, 1971. The list was part of a campaign officially known as "Opponents List" and "Political Enemies Project".

The list became public knowledge on June 27, 1973, when Dean mentioned during hearings with the Senate Watergate Committee that a list existed containing those whom the president did not like. Journalist Daniel Schorr, who happened to be on the list, managed to obtain a copy of it later that day.

A longer second list was made public by Dean on December 20, 1973, during a hearing with the Congressional Joint Committee on Internal Revenue Taxation.

== Purpose ==
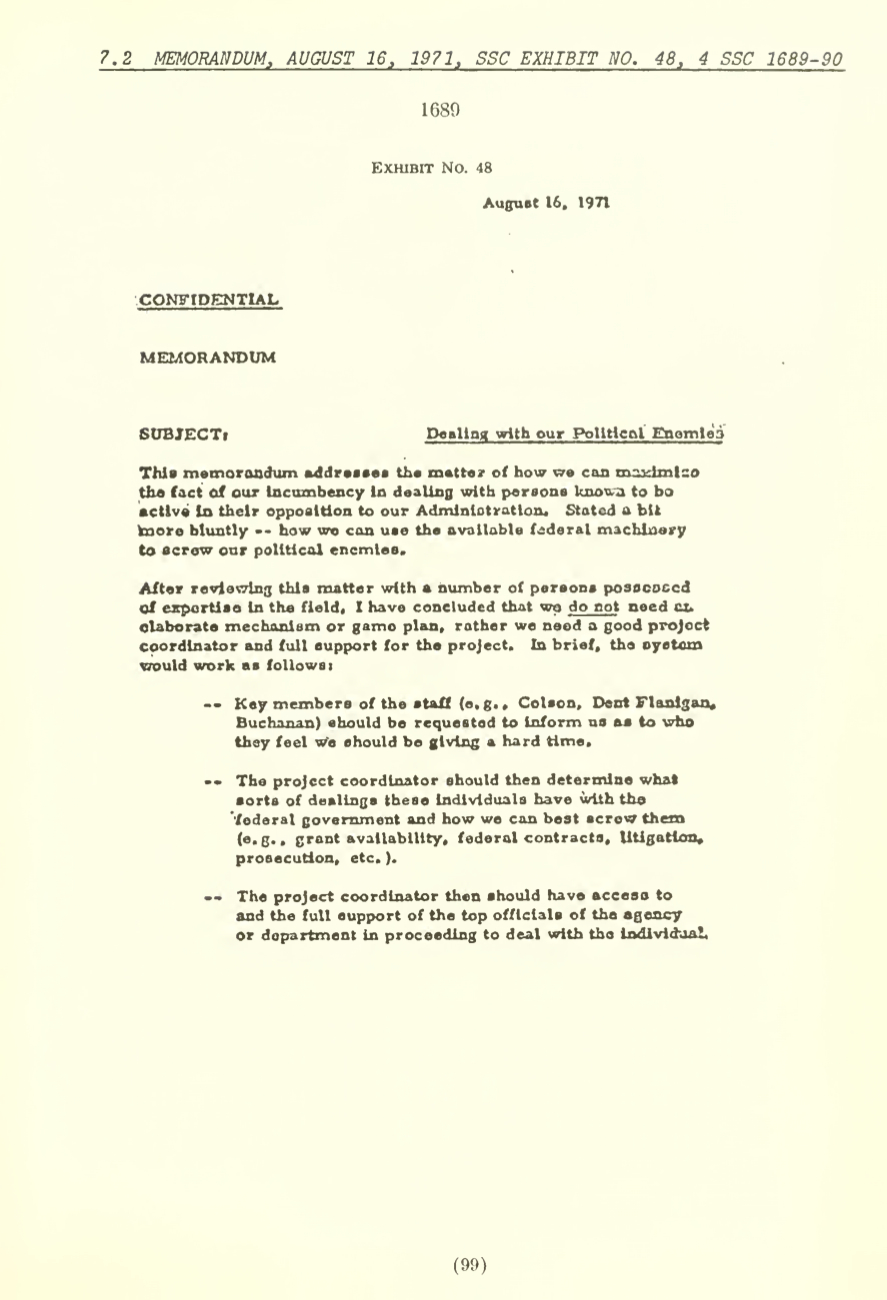
John Dean's cover memo, dated August 16, 1971.

The official purpose, as described by the White House Counsel's Office, was to "screw" Nixon's political enemies, by means of tax audits from the Internal Revenue Service, and by manipulating "grant availability, federal contracts, litigation, prosecution, etc." In a memorandum from John Dean to Lawrence Higby (August 16, 1971), Dean explained the purpose of the list:

This memorandum addresses the matter of how we can maximize the fact of our incumbency in dealing with persons known to be active in their opposition to our Administration; stated a bit more bluntly—how we can use the available federal machinery to screw our political enemies.

The IRS commissioner, Donald C. Alexander, refused to launch audits of the people on the list. While none on the list were audited, several major donors to the presidential campaign of George McGovern did get audited in 1973, prompting a later remark from Karl Hess, "The right of the victor of a presidential election is to the authority to audit the losers".

== People listed ==
The twenty names in the memo were as follows, although a master list of Nixon's political opponents with additional names was developed later.

- Arnold Picker, film executive
- Alexander E. Barkan, head of the AFL-CIO's Committee on Political Education
- Edwin Guthman, journalist
- Maxwell Dane, advertising executive
- Charles Dyson, businessman
- Howard Stein, financier
- Rep. Allard Lowenstein (D-NY), congressman
- Morton Halperin, foreign policy expert
- Leonard Woodcock, president of the United Auto Workers
- S. Sterling Munro Jr., aide of former Washington Senator Henry M. Jackson
- Bernard T. Feld, professor
- Sidney Davidoff, lawyer
- Rep. John Conyers (D-MI), congressman
- Samuel M. Lambert, executive secretary of the National Education Association
- Stewart Rawlings Mott, philanthropist
- Rep. Ron Dellums (D-CA), congressman
- Daniel Schorr, journalist
- S. Harrison Dogole, president of Globe Security Systems
- Paul Newman, actor
- Mary McGrory, journalist

== Master list of political opponents ==
According to Dean, Colson later compiled hundreds of names on a "master list" which changed constantly. On December 20, 1973, the Congressional Joint Committee on Internal Revenue Taxation concluded that people on the "Enemies" list had not been subjected to an unusual number of tax audits. The report revealed a second list of about 576 (with some duplicates) supporters and staffers of George McGovern's 1972 presidential campaign given to Internal Revenue Commissioner Johnnie Walters by John Dean on September 11, 1972. The Washington Post printed the entire list the next day, but The New York Times reported just a few paragraphs on page 21.

== Reception ==
Newsman Daniel Schorr and actor Paul Newman stated, separately, that inclusion on the list was their greatest accomplishment. When this list was released, Schorr read it live on television, not realizing that he was on the list until he came to his own name. Author Hunter S. Thompson remarked he was disappointed he was not on it.

== In popular culture ==
In the United States, the term "enemies list" has come to be used in contexts not associated with Richard Nixon. For example, satirist P. J. O'Rourke's 1989 "A Call for a New McCarthyism" in The American Spectator has a hybrid blacklist and enemies list, suggesting that, contrary to the spirits of these lists, the subjects there should be overexposed, not suppressed, "so that a surfeited public rebels in disgust."

In Philip Roth's Our Gang, which was published in 1971, two years before the list was first mentioned in public, the Nixon parody character Trick E. Dixon begins to compile a rudimentary list of five political enemies. It includes Jane Fonda and the Black Panthers who were on the real-life expanded master list, The Berrigans (who were not) and Curt Flood.

In "Homer's Enemy" (1997), an 8th-season episode of The Simpsons, Moe Szyslak shows off his own enemies list, which Barney Gumble quickly appraises as Nixon's list, with the latter's name crossed out and replaced with Moe's. Moe promptly adds Barney to the list for his insolence. An earlier episode was also a likely reference to the enemies' list when Homer falls to the floor as a result of a shoddy chair. In anger, Homer remarks that the manufacturer "just made the list!".

In Futurama's first episode, "Space Pilot 3000" (1999), Fry and Bender walk through a room of live preserved heads of famous people. When Fry knocks over Nixon's jar, Nixon says "That's it, you just made my list!"

In a BoJack Horseman second-season episode called "The Shot" (2015), the title character and Todd visit the Nixon Presidential Library with the intent of stealing a scaled-down replica of the library. Mounted on the walls are Nixon's Enemy and "Frenemy" Lists. Walt Disney is included on the Enemy List.

== See also ==
- Disposition Matrix
- IRS targeting controversy
- Ananias Club (Theodore Roosevelt)
