= Ambiguity tolerance–intolerance =

Proposed aspect of personality

Ambiguity tolerance–intolerance refers to a proposed aspect of personality that influences how individuals respond to ambiguous stimuli, though whether it constitutes a distinct psychological trait is disputed. Ambiguity may arise from being presented information that is unfamiliar or conflicting or when there is too much information available to process. When presented with such situations, ambiguity intolerant individuals are likely to experience anxiety and interpret the situation as threatening, and may attempt to avoid or ignore the ambiguity by rigidly adhering to inaccurate, simplistic interpretations. In contrast, an individual who is tolerant of ambiguity is more likely to remain neutral, adopt a flexible and open disposition, and adapt to the situation. Much of the initial research into the concept focused on intolerance of ambiguity, which has been correlated with prejudicial beliefs and the authoritarian personality.

== History ==
Ambiguity tolerance–intolerance was formally introduced in 1949 through an article published by Else Frenkel-Brunswik, who developed the concept in earlier work on ethnocentrism in children. In the article which defines the term, she considers, among other evidence, a study of schoolchildren who exhibit prejudice as the basis for the existence of intolerance of ambiguity. In the study, she tested the notion that children who are ethnically prejudiced also tend to reject ambiguity more so than their peers. To do this she used a story recall test to measure the children's prejudice, then presented the children with an ambiguous image, interviewed them about it, and recorded their responses. She found that the children who scored high in prejudice took longer to give a response to the shape and were less likely to make changes on their response and less likely to change their perspectives.

Frenkel-Brunswik continued to examine the concept in The Authoritarian Personality, which she co-authored with Theodor Adorno, Daniel Levinson, and Nevitt Sanford. In the book, intolerance of ambiguity is one aspect of the cognitive style of the authoritarian personality. Interest in and research on ambiguity tolerance-intolerance was highest in the two decades following Frenkel-Brunswik's initial publication, but the concept is still in use in contemporary work.

In the years following Frenkel-Brunswik's publications, her work and the concept of ambiguity tolerance-intolerance have been the subject of criticism. In 1958 a study by Kenny and Ginsberg was unable to replicate Frenkel-Brunswik's results, casting some doubt on her findings. In 1965, Stephen Bochner published an article criticizing Frenkel-Brunswik for failing to give a consistent definition of the term and arguing that Kenny and Ginsberg's replication study may have failed due to the inconsistency of Frenkel-Brunswik's use of ambiguity tolerance-intolerance.

== Definitions and measurement ==
Ambiguity tolerance–intolerance has been subject to criticism on the grounds that it has been poorly defined, and as such there have been many attempts to create a standardized definition that can be used more easily, while retaining a relationship to Frenkel-Brunswik's definition.

Budner (1962) defines intolerance of ambiguity to be the tendency to interpret ambiguity as a threat, while tolerance of ambiguity is the tendency to interpret ambiguity as desirable. In addition, he developed a scale with 16 items designed to measure how subjects would respond to an ambiguous situation in order to allow for more controlled research into the phenomenon.

Bochner (1965), though critical of Frenkel-Brunswik's definition, also organized a set of defining characteristics which are set out in her work. Bochner's attempt to organize her work resulted in nine primary characteristics of intolerance of ambiguity:

1. Need for categorization
2. Need for certainty
3. Inability to allow both good and bad traits to exist in the same person
4. Acceptance of attitude statements representing a black-and-white view of life
5. Preference for the familiar over the unfamiliar
6. Rejection of the unusual or different
7. Resistance to reversal of fluctuating stimuli
8. Premature selection of one solution in an ambiguous situation and rigid maintenance of the selection
9. Premature closure of interpretations

In addition Bochner lists nine secondary characteristics which describe what individuals who are intolerant of ambiguity will be:

1. authoritarian
2. dogmatic
3. rigid
4. close-minded
5. ethnically prejudiced
6. uncreative
7. anxious
8. extra-punitive
9. aggressive

Bochner however, is skeptical of whether clinging to Frenkel-Brunswik's definition and attempting to find measures of the characteristics is useful, as he argues that ambiguity tolerance-intolerance may not describe a unified, distinct phenomenon.

Further methods for measuring ambiguity intolerance have been proposed by Block and Block (1951) and Levitt (1953). Block and Block (1951) operationalized the construct by measuring the amount of time required to structure an ambiguous situation. In this method, the amount of time required to structure is associated with ambiguity tolerance; someone intolerant of ambiguity will desire to find a structure quickly, while a person tolerant of ambiguity would take more time to consider the situation. Levitt (1953) studied intolerance of ambiguity in children and asserted that the decision location test and misconception scale both served as accurate measures of ambiguity intolerance.

== Psychological implications ==
Ambiguity tolerance–intolerance is relevant to and used in many branches of psychology including personality psychology, developmental psychology, and social psychology. Some examples of the construct's use in different disciplines are listed below.

=== Personality psychology ===
The construct of ambiguity intolerance was first used in the study of personality and research on the topic is still undertaken despite criticism of the link between intolerance of ambiguity and authoritarianism. A study testing college students' tolerance for ambiguity found that students who were involved in the arts had higher scores on ambiguity tolerance than business students and concluded that tolerance of ambiguity correlates with creativity.

=== Developmental psychology ===
Harington, Block, and Block (1978) assessed intolerance of ambiguity in children at an early age, ranging from 3.5 to 4.5 years. The children were assessed using two tests performed by caretakers in a daycare center. The researchers then re-evaluated the children when they turned seven, and their data showed that male students who were ranked high in ambiguity intolerance at an early age had more anxiety, required more structure, and had less effective cognitive structure than their female peers who had also tested high in ambiguity intolerance.

=== Social psychology ===
Ambiguity intolerance can affect how an individual perceives others. Social psychology uses ambiguity tolerance–intolerance to investigate and explain interpersonal relationship dynamics. Research has been conducted on how ambiguity tolerance–intolerance interacts with racial identity, homophobia, marital satisfaction, and pregnancy adjustment.

=== Mental health ===
Research shows that ranking in the extremes of ambiguity tolerance or intolerance can be detrimental to mental health. Ambiguity intolerance is thought to serve as a cognitive vulnerability that can contribute to the development of depression. Anderson and Schwartz hypothesize that ambiguity intolerance may lead to depression as those who are intolerant tend to see the world as concrete and unchanging and are unable to effectively interpret and cope with external change. The discontinuity between their interpretations and their external situation results in negative thoughts, and due to the need for certainty ambiguity intolerant individuals have, these negative thoughts are quickly interpreted as certainties. This certainty can serve as a predictive measure of depression.

== See also ==
- Cognitive dissonance
- Need for cognitive closure
