= Integrated threat theory =

Theory of prejudice in psychology and sociology

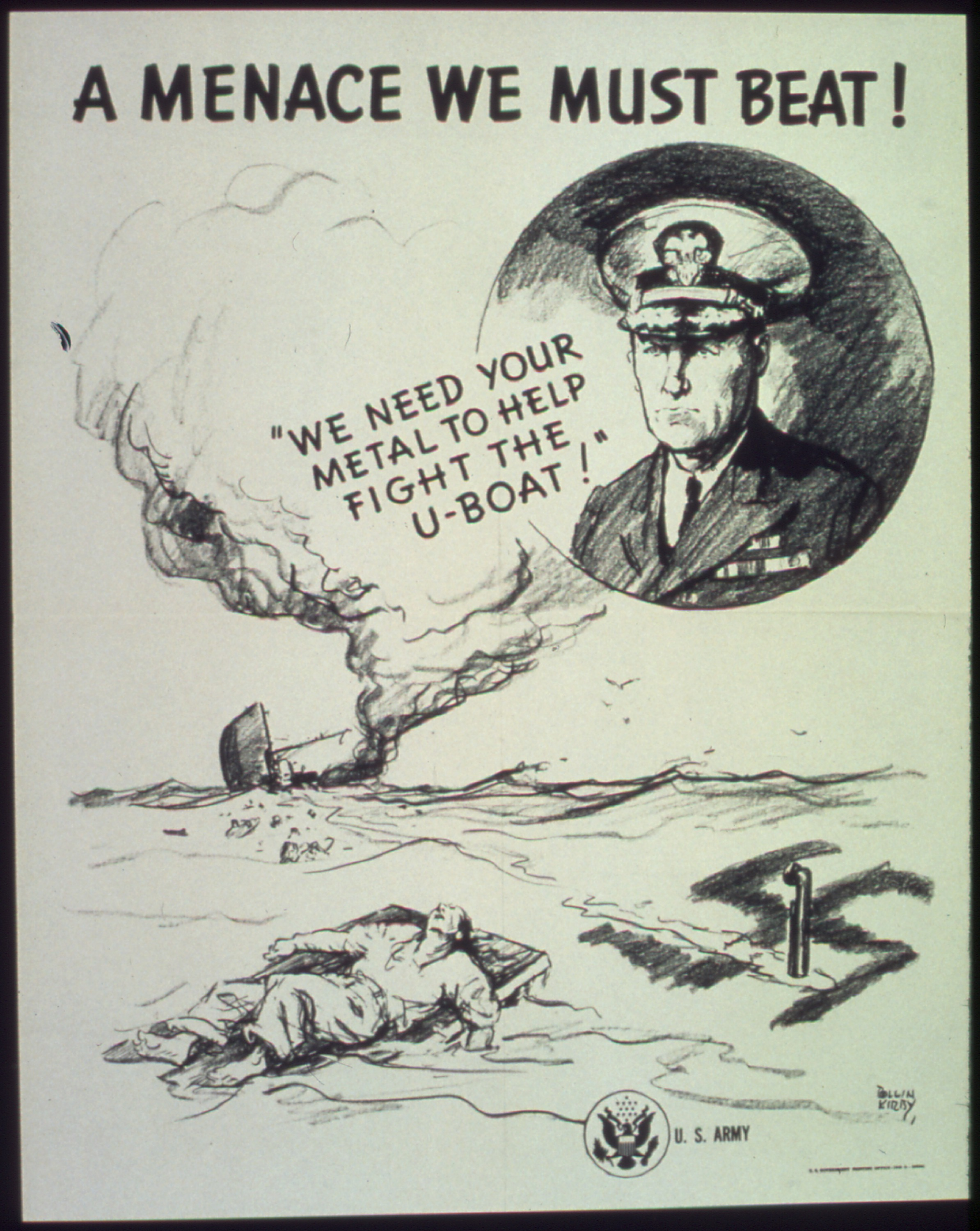
Propaganda cartoon used during World War II.

Integrated threat theory (ITT), also known as intergroup threat theory, is a theory in psychology and sociology which attempts to describe the components of perceived threat that lead to prejudice between social groups. The theory applies to any social group that may feel threatened in some way, whether or not that social group is a majority or minority group in their society. This theory deals with perceived threat rather than actual threat. Perceived threat includes all of the threats that members of group believe they are experiencing, regardless of whether those threats actually exist. For example, people may feel their economic well-being is threatened by an outgroup stealing their jobs even if, in reality, the outgroup has no effect on their job opportunities. Still, their perception that their job security is under threat can increase their levels of prejudice against the outgroup. Thus, even false alarms about threat still have "real consequence" for prejudice between groups.

== Original components of the theory ==
ITT was first proposed by Walter G. Stephan and Cookie White Stephan (2000). The original theory had four components: realistic threats, symbolic threats, intergroup anxiety, and negative stereotypes.

=== Realistic threats ===
Realistic threats are threats that pose a danger to the ingroup's well-being. These can include threats to physical safety or health, threats to economic and political power, and threats to the existence of the group. This component was originally developed as a part of realistic conflict theory by Donald T. Campbell (1965).

=== Symbolic threats ===
Symbolic threats arise where there is a perceived difference between the values and worldview of an ingroup and outgroup. The difference can make the ingroup feel that the outgroup poses a threat to their group morals, standards, beliefs, and attitudes. These threats are thus strongly tied to a group's sense of identity. The category was derived from Gordon Allport's discussion of the relationship between one's values and one's identity. He proposed that, since values are important to who we are, we will reject other groups that disagree with our values. It is also based on the research of Esses et al. (1993), who found that groups had more negative feelings towards an outgroup if that outgroup interfered with the ingroup's customs.

=== Intergroup anxiety ===
Intergroup anxiety refers to the expectation that interacting with someone from a different group will be a negative experience. People with intergroup anxiety fear that they will feel uncomfortable, embarrassed, unsafe, or judged, either by members of the outgroup or by people of their own ingroup. Before creating the ITT framework, Stephan & Stephan (1985) had been conducting research on intergroup anxiety. The concept of intergroup anxiety also draws from the Aversive Racism theory, which argues that subconscious negative feelings about Black Americans are an important part of racism against them.

=== Negative stereotypes ===
Stereotypes are a strategy of simplifying a complex situation by relying on popular pre-set judgements. ITT predicts that negative pre-set judgments about another group can lead to prejudice. This component of ITT draws from research that found that belief in negatively-rated stereotypical traits was linked to higher levels of prejudice against the stereotyped group. Stephan & Stephan (2000) acknowledged that some research has not found links between prejudice and general stereotypes. Thus, it seems that, while general stereotypes assume some positive things about other groups, only the negative aspects of stereotypes are relevant to prejudice.

== Updated two-component theory ==
Stephan & Renfro (2002) proposed an updated version of the theory which reduced the four components to two basic types: realistic and symbolic threats. The categories of negative stereotypes and intergroup anxiety were removed from the basic framework of the theory because they were found to be better understood as subtypes of threat. They can lead to either realistic or symbolic threats rather than standing as their own separate categories. For example, intergroup anxiety can be based on expectations of physical danger, a realistic threat, as well as on expectations of damage to one's identity, a symbolic threat.

=== Experimental Support ===
Since ITT makes a causal claim that perceived threat causes prejudice, studies using an experimental design are necessary. Some researchers have taken on this task to experimentally manipulate types of realistic and perceived threat in order to examine if they cause prejudice. For example, Esses et al. (1998) and Esses et al. (2001) carried out research studies in which they manipulated the research participants' understanding of economic threat posed by immigrants. Esses et al. (1998) had Canadian undergraduate student participants read one of two editorials that were written for the study. One editorial discussed a new group of immigrants with no mention of the job market while the other editorial discussed the same group and emphasized their success in finding jobs despite the scarcity of jobs in Canada. They then studied the effects of perception of economic threat, a type of realistic threat, on attitudes about immigrants and reported willingness to help immigrants. Results showed that participants that read the editorial that emphasized competition had less favorable attitudes towards immigrants and were less likely to approve of programs to empower immigrants. Esses et al. (2001) carried out similar experiments with very similar editorials. Their results showed that participants that read articles that emphasized the tough job market had more negative attitudes towards the immigrants, were less supportive of their immigration into Canada, and were less supportive of programs to empower immigrants. The data from these research studies provide some support for the causal influence of realistic threat on prejudice against immigrants.

The causal influence of symbolic threat on prejudice was partially explored in a study by Branscombe & Wann (1994), who focused on perceived threat to ingroup identity in particular. The participants, undergraduate females from the U.S., answered questionnaires about their levels of pride in their American identity at the beginning of the study. They then manipulated the participants' perceived threat to ingroup identity using video clips, which either showed an American or a Russian boxer beating the other in a match. After seeing one version of the video, participants completed a questionnaire that measured their desire to distance themselves from the outgroup, in this case, Russians. The results of this study showed that increased perception of threat to ingroup identity raises a desire to distance oneself from the outgroup. This provides some experimental evidence that perception of threat to ingroup identity may cause greater prejudice towards outgroups. However, further experimental research is necessary in order to more firmly and widely establish the causal role of realistic and symbolic threats in prejudice.

== Factors that influence levels of perceived threat ==
There are several factors that can lead to increased or decreased levels of group perceived threat.

=== Power Dynamics ===
The updated ITT theory draws from the findings of contact hypothesis, which claims that it is important to have equality between groups. Power dynamics between two groups are shown to have an influence on how the groups relate to and perceive each other. High-power groups are more likely to influence and threaten other groups. Low-power groups are often vulnerable to the influence and threats of other groups. Thus, low-power groups tend to be on alert and perceive more threats than high power groups do. Corenblum & Stephan (2001) found, for example, that Native Canadians felt more threatened by White Canadians than White Canadians felt about them. However, when high-power groups do perceive threat from another group, they "will react more strongly" than low-power groups. This is likely because they have more to lose if the threat is real and have more resources that allow them to counter to such threats. Two groups of relatively equal power status can be especially sensitive to feeling threatened if they are in competition with each other for resources, such as jobs.

=== Identity ===
Stephan & Renfro (2016) predicted that, the more important group membership is to ingroup members' sense of personal identity, the more likely those people will feel threatened by and uncomfortable when interacting with other groups. According to this prediction, people with strong ingroup identification are likely to be more focused on differences between the groups, thus giving them more motivation to hold negative stereotypes of other groups so that they can believe that their group is the best.

=== Culture ===
There may be a link between the personal importance of group membership and the larger culture in which the groups live. Collectivistic cultures, for example, place a greater emphasis on the importance of group membership compared to individualistic cultures. Culture can also influence perceived threat between groups through the culture's level of uncertainty avoidance. Hofstede & Bond (1984) define uncertainty avoidance as "the degree to which people feel threatened by ambiguous situations, and have created beliefs and institutions that try to avoid these." Stephan & Renfro (2002) thus suggest that cultures which hold norms and laws as very important are likely to perceive threat from "unfamiliar groups." Further research on these topics can better inform the role of culture in intergroup relationships.

== Research applications ==
ITT has been used in research on various social groups, including immigrants, Muslims, tourists, and more.

=== Immigrants ===
Multiple studies on intergroup relations have focused on immigrants. For example, Ward & Masgoret (2006) built upon ITT in combination with the Instrumentive Model of Group Conflict to test a model of attitudes toward immigrants, using participants from New Zealand. These participants filled out questionnaires that measured Multicultural Ideology, Intergroup Anxiety, Contact with Immigrants, Perceived Intergroup Threat, and Attitudes toward Immigrants. The results supported the model, suggesting that increased contact with immigrants and multicultural ideology are related to lower levels of perceived threat from immigrants, which is in turn directly related to more positive attitudes towards immigrants.

Croucher (2013) used the ITT framework to explore reasons that dominant groups in France, Germany, and Great Britain sometimes resist Muslim immigrants' efforts to assimilate. The data was collected through questionnaires, which included measures for symbolic threats, realistic threats, stereotypes, perception of immigrants' motivation to assimilate, and multigroup ethnic identity. The results supported the theory that the more that the dominant groups felt threatened by the immigrants, the less they thought that the immigrants wanted to assimilate into their country.

Similarly, Rohmann et al. (2008) used the ITT framework to examine the relationship between perceived threat and a dominant group's expectation of an immigrant group's attitude about acculturation. Their research included two studies, one in which German participants were asked about their expectations of French and Turkish immigrants in Germany and another in which German participants were asked about their expectations of two fictitious groups, based on paragraph-long descriptions. Results from both studies suggest that levels of perceived threat are higher if dominant groups expect that an immigrant group has different attitudes about acculturation than the dominant group does.

=== Muslims ===
Tausch et al. (2009) examined Muslim relations with Hindus in India. ITT was incorporated into their research in order to examine which factors are important in perceived threat between the minority Muslim and majority Hindu groups of India. Their data was collected through a survey given to both Muslim and Hindu students at the same university, which measured contact quantity, contact quality, perceived relative status of the two groups, realistic threats, symbolic threats, intergroup anxiety, preference for social distance, and ingroup bias. Results showed that symbolic threat was important for Hindus' levels of perceived threat while realistic threat was important for Muslims' levels of perceived threat.

Gonzalez et al. (2008) carried out similar research in the Netherlands, examining the prejudice of Dutch youth, who are members of the majority, against the Muslim minority in the country. Their data was collected through a questionnaire given to high schoolers in different cities, which measured support for multicultural ideologies, frequency of contact with Muslims, ingroup identification, realistic economic threat, symbolic threats, stereotypes, and prejudicial attitudes towards Muslims. Results showed that prejudicial attitudes were related to higher perception of symbolic threats and more belief in stereotypes.

Uenal (2016) applied the ITT framework to better understand factors involved in the presence of Islamophobic conspiracy stereotypes in Europe. The data was collected through an online survey given to German university students which measured ambiguity intolerance, belief in a clash of civilizations, realistic threats, symbolic threats, and levels of education. Ambiguity intolerance was found to be related to increased conspiracy stereotypes through increased perceptions of symbolic threat. Belief in a clash of civilizations was found to be related to higher levels of realistic and symbolic threat and higher levels of belief in conspiracy stereotypes. Higher education levels showed the opposite trends, as it was related to lower levels of perceived threat and lower levels of belief in conspiracy stereotypes.

=== Tourists ===
Tourism can bring different groups into contact and has thus been the subject of some research on intergroup relations using ITT. For example, Ward & Berno (2011) used ITT and contact hypothesis as theoretical backgrounds for predicting attitudes about tourism in Fiji and New Zealand. They collected data through surveys, which included measures of perceived impact of tourism, contact with tourists, the four aspects of the original ITT, and attitudes towards tourists. Following the expectations of ITT, the data showed that lower levels of perceived realistic threat, symbolic threat, and intergroup anxiety, and more positive stereotypes were useful predictors of positives attitudes about tourism. Monterubio (2016) applied ITT in studying negative attitudes towards spring break tourists in Cancun, Mexico. Data was collected through interviews with Cancun residents, which included questions about the social impact of spring break and attitudes towards spring breakers. Transcripts of these interviews were then analyzed for themes, including the four components of the original ITT. The results suggested that realistic threats and intergroup anxiety were relevant aspects of prejudice against spring break tourists, largely because of the influence of their behavior. Olaghere (2023) used ITT in an exploratory sequential study to investigate the impacts of tourism on residents of the Seychelles islands. Data were obtained through a mixed method (interviews and questionnaire surveys) along the four components of ITT. Realistic threats included restricted access to certain beaches, economic leakages, and increasing strain on infrastructure. Symbolic threats were increases in incidents of prostitution and drug use. Analyses of the results further indicated that the residents perceived the threats to be outweighed by the benefits and therefore retained positive attitudes towards tourists. The results did not support intergroup anxiety and negative stereotypes.

== Critique of the theory ==
Stephan & Renfro (2002) updated ITT into the two-factor model and admitted that "ultimately, the model is circular." The theory states that perceived threat leads to prejudice but the outcomes of that prejudice itself can also lead into increased perceived threat.

Anxiety/Uncertainty Management Theory counters the way that ITT conceptualizes anxiety as harmful for relationships between social groups. Instead, it understands anxiety as helpful for leading to more effective communication between groups.

== See also ==
- Ambiguity intolerance
- Authoritarian personality
- Fearmongering
- Need for closure
- Realistic group conflict theory
- Regality theory
- Right-wing authoritarianism
- Social dominance orientation
- System justification theory
- Terror management theory
