= Evolutionary psychology and culture =

Psychologic study

Evolutionary psychology has traditionally focused on individual-level behaviors, determined by species-typical psychological adaptations. Considerable work, though, has been done on how these adaptations shape and, ultimately govern, culture (Tooby and Cosmides, 1989). Tooby and Cosmides (1989) argued that the mind consists of many domain-specific psychological adaptations, some of which may constrain what cultural material is learned or taught. As opposed to a domain-general cultural acquisition program, where an individual passively receives culturally-transmitted material from the group, Tooby and Cosmides (1989), among others, argue that: "the psyche evolved to generate adaptive rather than repetitive behavior, and hence critically analyzes the behavior of those surrounding it in highly structured and patterned ways, to be used as a rich (but by no means the only) source of information out of which to construct a 'private culture' or individually tailored adaptive system; in consequence, this system may or may not mirror the behavior of others in any given respect." (Tooby and Cosmides 1989).

== Epidemiological culture ==
The Epidemiology of representations, or cultural epidemiology, is a broad framework for understanding cultural phenomena by investigating the distribution of mental representations in and through populations. The theory of cultural epidemiology was largely developed by Dan Sperber to study society and cultures. The theory has implications for psychology and anthropology. Mental representations are transferred from person to person through cognitive causal chains. Sperber (2001) identified three different, yet interrelated, cognitive causal chains, outlined in Table 1. A cognitive causal chain (CCC) links a perception to an evolved, domain-specific response or process. For example:

On October 31, at 7:30 p.m., Mrs. Jones’s doorbell rings. Mrs. Jones hears the doorbell, and assumes that there is somebody at the door. She remembers it is Halloween: she enjoyed receiving treats as a child, and now, as an adult, she enjoys giving them. She guesses that there must be children at the door ready to trick-or-treat, and that, if she opens, she will be able to give them the candies she has bought for the occasion. Mrs. Jones decides to open the door, and does so.

Social Cognitive Causal Chains (SCCC) are inter-individual CCCs. Here, a CCC is used as an act of communication between people (i.e. the mental representation is shared between multiple people). Elaborating on the previous example:

On October 31, at 7:30 p.m., Mrs. Jones’s doorbell rings. Mrs. Jones hears the doorbell, and assumes that there is somebody at the door. She remembers it is Halloween: she enjoyed receiving treats as a child, and now, as an adult, she enjoys giving them. She guesses that there must be children at the door ready to trick-or-treat, and that, if she opens, she will be able to give them the candies she has bought for the occasion. Mrs. Jones decides to open the door, and does so.

Cultural Cognitive Causal Chains (CCCCs) are those SCCCs which are shared and reproduced widely among a population.

Cognitive causal chain (CCC)

A causal chain where each causal link instantiates a semantic relationship

Social cognitive causal chain (SCCC)

A CCC that extends over several individuals

Cultural cognitive causal chain (CCCC)

A social CCC that stabilizes mental representations and public productions in a population and its environment

Table 1: Overview of cognitive causal chains constituting the epidemiology of representations (from).

The stability and longevity of these representations relies on their relevance and domain-specificity. This separates the epidemiology of representations from other evolutionary accounts of cultural transmission, namely memetics.

== Culture and other evolutionary disciplines ==
=== Evolutionary psychology and cultural evolution ===
Evolutionary psychological accounts of culture, especially cultural epidemiology, may seem at odds with other disciplines in psychology and anthropology, especially research in cultural evolution (e.g. Boyd and Richerson, 1985, 2005). Cultural evolution, the domain of research focused on how culture changes through time due to different individual transmission mechanisms and population-level effects, often uses models derived from population genetics, in which agents are passive recipients of cultural traits (e.g. Bentley et al., 2004). While evolutionary psychology has focused on how behavior may result from species-typical psychological programs which led to greater fitness in ancestral environments, this work has been criticized for neglecting how behavior may be shaped by culturally transmitted information. In contrast to genetic programs, cultural evolution investigates how culture itself may evolve (Mesoudi, 2009). Gene-culture coevolution studies how culture and genetic evolution influence each other, ultimately shaping behavior, as well. Cultural evolution and evolutionary psychology may not be as disparate as one may think, though. Rather than a passive receptacle of cultural material, Boyd and Richerson (1985, 2005) suggest that our minds consist of psychological mechanisms which direct our attention to and imitate cultural traits depending on the frequency of that trait, the content of it, who carries it, etc. In this way, cultural evolution may be viewed as a particular kind of “scaling up” from the individual-level processes to population-level ones. In neither account of culture is the mind a blank slate or empty bin for cultural material (Tooby and Cosmides, 1992). Some evolutionary psychologists have suggested that culturally-transmitted culture may pass through a number of lenses and filters shaped by natural selection to catch fitness-relevant information and behaviors; these filters may change due to local environmental conditions, sex, and other factors (Gangestad et al., 2006). Boyer (2000) argued that evolutionary psychology, and anthropology in general, should investigate how these cognitive predispositions to cultural material affect their representation in following generations. This research program may help to unify the two fields (Boyer, 2000). Others have suggested that evolutionary psychology, human behavioral ecology, and cultural evolution all fit nicely with each other, ultimately answering different questions on human behavioral diversity; gene-culture coevolution may be at odds with other research programs though by placing more emphasis on socially-learned behavior and its influence on human evolution (Brown et al., 2011).

=== Evolutionary psychology and human behavioral ecology ===
Human Behavioral Ecology (HBE) studies how ecology and social factors shape human behavioral variability. A key assumption of human behavioral ecology is that individuals will act in response to environmental factors in ways that enhance their fitness. While both HBE and evolutionary psychology are both concerned with fitness benefits and natural selection, HBE is not typically concerned with mechanisms or how humans display adaptive behaviors in novel environments. If the human mind took its present form and evolved in the African Pleistocene, why should one expect to behave adaptively in the present and in so many new environments? Human Behavioral Ecologists may respond by stating that humans evolved as ecological generalists and display a wide range of variable behaviors to maximize fitness. Where cooperation and food-sharing among extant hunter-gatherers may be seen as the result of kin-selection psychological mechanisms by an evolutionary psychologist, a human behavioral ecologist may attribute this behavior to optimal risk-reduction strategies and reciprocal altruism. For Human Behavioral Ecology, cultural behaviors should tend towards optimality (i.e. higher fitness) in their current environment. For evolutionary psychology, cultural behaviors are the result of psychological mechanisms which were selected for in ancestral environments.

=== Evoked and transmitted culture ===
The difference between cultural behaviors acquired through selective transmission mechanisms and behaviors resulting from psychological adaptations has resulted in some researchers differentiating between evoked and transmitted culture (Tooby and Cosmides, 1992). Evoked cultural behaviors are those that are the outputs of shared psychological mechanisms in response to local environmental cues Fessler et al., 2015). Transmitted cultural behaviors are those behaviors which are learned from one’s social group, regardless of environment. As such, investigating evoked culture may well rest in the domain of evolutionary psychology and transmitted culture studied by culture evolution, social psychology, and other disciplines. Differentiating between the two is more difficult than it may appear, however. For example, given the level of cross-cultural variation in human societies, variation between any two cultures may result from separate histories and cultural evolutionary pathways or different evoked cultures, based on different local environmental cues, while uniformity across cultures could result from convergent cultural evolution or similarly functioning psychological adaptations (Fessler et al., 2015). Specifically, if two cultures exhibit similar behaviors to avoid pathogens, can one differentiate between either the two groups independently inventing similar behaviors or the groups displaying the same underlying psychological adaptation for pathogen avoidance? As well, the issue of behavioral variation and transmitted culture may be seen as a major point of contention between evolutionary psychology and other disciplines, especially gene-culture coevolution. Evolutionary psychology and human behavioral ecology both admit to cultural transmission as a source of behavioral variation but do not see it as an evolutionary process or its potential to have significantly affected human evolution. Gene-culture coevolution would argue that culture traits may have altered genetic change and selection pressures, ultimately affecting cognition. However, as Brown et al. (2011) states:"Whether human behavioural ecologists and evolutionary psychologists are willing to accommodate the idea that some portion of human behavioural diversity could result from genetic differences that have arisen via selection pressures imposed by socially transmitted behaviour remains to be seen."

While this may difficult, some evolutionary psychologists, such as Gangestad, Haselton, and Buss (2006) have argued that the future of the discipline rests on unifying transmitted and evoked culture. In order to do so, the authors suggest that a more comprehensive definition of culture needs to be developed since different cultural phenomena need different kinds of analysis to investigate their effects. As they state, “Culture, however, is not a "thing" with singularity; it's an umbrella concept subsuming a collection of extraordinarily varied phenomena, each of which requires scientific analysis” (Gangestad et al., 2006). Ultimately, the issues of behavioral variation through evoked or transmitted culture must rest on empirical evidence.

=== Psychology, culture, and human evolution ===
While most researchers would accept the notion that psychological adaptations, shaped by natural selection, underlie culture, some would stress the strength of cultural behaviors on shaping selection pressures (Boyd and Richerson, 2005) or emphasize cultural niche construction (Laland et al., 2000). Still others have argued for a kind of cognitive niche construction, where culture changes the selection pressures on cognition, resulting in emergent psychological modules (e.g. Wheeler and Clark, 2008). Wheeler and Clark (2008) have named this interplay between genes, culture, and embodiment the “triple helix.” The authors suggest that self-created environmental structures and reliance on culturally-transmitted information selected for cognitive modules for continual bootstrapping and increases in computational complexity. Their argument relies on cognitive niche construction, where culturally-learned behaviors create a space for new feedback cycles. By shaping the physical space around oneself, for example, the culturally-transmitted practice transform problem solving for new forms of thought. The feedback cycle, as they and others argue, will alter selection pressures for cognitive developmental programs which bolster these abilities. As they state, “Triple helix models of mind recognize the role of genetic biases in sculpting key developmental trajectories, and the resulting space both for strong forms of genetically specified cognitive modularity and for weaker forms of emergent modularity resulting from trajectories marked by multiple bouts of culturally scaffolded experience and the self- selection of environments” (Wheeler and Clark, 2008. Other authors have suggested that borrowing methods of dynamical systems analysis may help unravel this tangled web of genes, cognition, and culture (Kenrick et al., 2003). The answers to these types of questions have impacts on anthropology, social psychology, and other behavioral sciences (Mesoudi, 2009).

=== Evolved responses to intergroup conflict ===
War and intergroup conflict is a strong evolutionary factor. The so-called regality theory describes how human psychological traits are responding to either a hostile or a peaceful environment. Humans show authoritarian reactions and preferences for a strong leader in case of war or perceived collective danger. The evolutionary function of this so-called regal reaction is that it allows a strong leader to solve the collective action problem in war and suppress free riding. The whole society and culture is shaped by the regal psychological reactions of its members. A regal society is characterized by an authoritarian and hierarchical organization, strict discipline, intolerance, and xenophobia.

The opposite of the regal reaction is called kungic. The kungic reaction is seen when a group of people are living in peace and security. People will not tolerate a tyrannical leader who can exploit all resources to enrich himself. Instead, people will prefer an egalitarian and tolerant society when they live in an environment of collective safety.

== See also ==
- Evolutionary psychology
- Dual inheritance theory
- Theory of Regal and Kungic Societal Structures
- Culture
- Anthropology
