= Authoritarian personality =

Disposition towards authoritarian ideas

The authoritarian personality is a personality type characterized by a disposition to treat the voice of authority figures with unquestioning obedience and respect. Conceptually, the term originated from the writings of Erich Fromm and is usually applied to people who exhibit a strict and oppressive personality towards their subordinates, but was in fact inspired by Siegfried Kracauer's observation of a niche catering to the decisions of those they perceived to be above them and behaving aggressively toward those below them. Regardless of whether authoritarianism is more of a personality, attitude, ideology or disposition, scholars find it has had significant influence on public opinion and political behavior.

== Historical origins ==
In his 1941 book Escape from Freedom, a psychological exploration of modern politics, Erich Fromm described authoritarianism as a defence mechanism.

In The Authoritarian Personality (1950), Theodor W. Adorno, Else Frenkel-Brunswik, Daniel Levinson, and Nevitt Sanford proposed a personality type that involved the "potentially fascistic individual". The historical background that influenced the theoretical development of the authoritarian personality, as cited in the book, included the rise of fascism in the 1930s, World War II (1939–1945), and The Holocaust, which indicated that the fascistic individual was found to have been psychologically susceptible to the ideology of antisemitism and to the emotional appeal of anti-democratic politics. Known as the Berkeley studies, the researches of Adorno and Frenkel-Brunswik, and of Levinson and Sanford concentrated upon prejudice, which they studied within the psychoanalytic and psychosocial frameworks of Freudian and Frommian theories. Adorno wrote that fascist propaganda encourages identification with an authoritarian personality characterized by traits such as obedience and extreme aggression.

The Berkley studies made a link between Fascism and the manipulation of conservative values. In one conclusion, Adorno distinguishes between "genuine" conservatives and "pseudo" conservatives, and argues that the latter misuse conservative values to promote fascism. "The idea is that the potentially fascist character … is not only on the over level but throughout the makeup of his personality a pseudo-conservative rather than a genuine conservative"

The book was described as a landmark work in social science that generated significant criticism of certain of its methods and results but also confirmation of many of its findings in independent studies. Following its publication was an extensive debate on the merits of the work, with many of the themes of this debate persisting in authoritarianism research today. According to the book, the authoritarian person also presents a cynical and disdainful view of humanity and a need to wield power and be tough, which arise from the anxieties produced by the perceived lapses of people who do not abide by the conventions and social norms of society (destructiveness and cynicism); a general tendency to focus upon people who violate the value system and to act oppressively against them (authoritarian aggression); anti-intellectualism, a general opposition to the subjective and imaginative tendencies of the mind (anti-intraception); and an exaggerated concern with sexual promiscuity, especially when concerning women. The f-scale of the studies fell into disrepute as being unreliable only after about 10 years. Other criticisms of the sociologic theory presented in The Authoritarian Personality concerned themselves with the validity of the psychoanalytic interpretation of personality and the book's bias that authoritarianism exists only in the right wing of the political spectrum.

According to Adorno et al., in human psychological development the formation of the authoritarian personality occurs within the first years of a child's life, strongly influenced and shaped by the parents' personalities and the organizational structure of the child's family; thus, parent–child relations that are "hierarchical, authoritarian, [and] exploitative" can result in a child developing an authoritarian personality. Authoritarian-personality characteristics are fostered by parents who have a psychological need for domination, and who harshly threaten their child to compel obedience to conventional behaviors. Moreover, such domineering parents also are preoccupied with social status, a concern they communicate by having the child follow rigid, external rules. In consequence of such domination, the child suffers emotionally from the suppression of his or her feelings of aggression and resentment towards the domineering parents, whom the child reverently idealizes, but does not criticize. Such personalities may also be related to studies in preschool children of personality and political views as reported by scientists in 2006 which concluded that some children described as being "somewhat dominating" were later found, as adults, to be "relatively liberal", and those described as "relatively over-controlled" were later found, as adults, to be "relatively conservative"; in the words of the researchers,

Preschool children who 20 years later were relatively liberal were characterized as: developing close relationships, self-reliant, energetic, somewhat dominating, relatively under-controlled, and resilient. Preschool children subsequently relatively conservative at age 23 were described as: feeling easily victimized, easily offended, indecisive, fearful, rigid, inhibited, and relatively over-controlled and vulnerable.

== Perceived threat ==
Marc Hetherington and Jonathan Weiler argue in Authoritarianism and Polarization in American Politics that perceived threat is a crucial variable in activating an authoritarian disposition, independent of objective threat level. They suggest that this helps to explain higher rates of authoritarianism after social and economic crises, especially in developing countries where such crises tend to be more frequent and more severe, as well as after security crises like September 11th. The authors believe that some people who tend to be more pessimistic and experience higher levels of stress and must rely more on instinct than cognition for decision-making, as opposed to those who under normal circumstances are more optimistic and at-ease, will also respond in a more authoritarian way when feeling threatened.

== Links to gender inequality ==
According to a study by Brandt and Henry, there is a direct correlation between the rates of gender inequality and the levels of authoritarian ideas in the male and female populations in individualistic societies. It was found that in countries with less gender equality where individualism was encouraged and men occupied the dominant societal roles, women were more likely to support traits such as obedience which would allow them to survive in an authoritarian environment and less likely to encourage ideas such as independence and imagination. In countries with higher levels of gender equality, women held less authoritarian views. There is no relationship between gender equality and the gender that tends to held authoritarianism views in collectivistic societies. It is theorized that this occurs due to the stigma attached to individuals who question the cultural norms set by the dominant individuals and establishments in an authoritarian society as a way to prevent the psychological stress caused by the active ostracizing of the stigmatized individuals. Involuntary celibacy was associated with criticism of liberalism.

== Connection to prejudice ==
The concept of the authoritarian personality is closely related to prejudice. Social psychology research has established that people who exhibit high authoritarian personality traits will demonstrate negative group attitudes toward people from outside their own group.

People who display this behavior will treat social distinctions as dangerous threats, which leads them to create two distinct groups named "us" and "them".

The connection between authoritarianism and support for exclusionary social systems with established social classes helps to explain this issue. Research studies which assess right-wing authoritarianism (RWA) have established a consistent positive relationship between authoritarian beliefs and different types of discriminatory behavior.

== Modern models ==
C.G. Sibley and J. Duckitt reported that more recent research has produced two more effective scales of measurement for predicting prejudice and other characteristics associated with authoritarian personalities. The first scale is called the right-wing authoritarianism (RWA) and the second is called the social dominance orientation (SDO).

Bob Altemeyer used the right-wing authoritarianism (RWA) scale to identify, measure, and quantify the personality traits of authoritarian people. The political personality type identified with the RWA scale indicates the existence of three psychological tendencies and attitudinal clusters characteristic of the authoritarian personality: (i) Submission to legitimate authorities; (ii) Aggression towards minority groups whom authorities identified as targets for sanctioned political violence; and (iii) Adherence to cultural values and political beliefs endorsed by the authorities. As measured with the NEO-PI-R Openness scale, the research indicates a negative correlation (r = 0.57) between the personality trait of "openness to experience", of the Five Factor Model of the human personality.

The research of Jost, Glaser, Arie W. Kruglanski, and Sulloway (2003) indicates that authoritarianism and right-wing authoritarianism are ideological constructs for social cognition, by which political conservatives view people who are the Other who is not the Self. That the authoritarian personality and the conservative personality share two, core traits: (i) resistance to change (social, political, economic), and (ii) justification for social inequality among the members of society. Conservatives have a psychological need to manage existential uncertainty and threats with situational motives (striving for dominance in social hierarchies) and with dispositional motives (self-esteem and the management of fear).

Research on ideology, politics, and racist prejudice, by John Duckitt and Chris Sibley, identified two types of authoritarian worldview: (i) that the social world is dangerous, which leads to right-wing authoritarianism; and (ii) that the world is a ruthlessly competitive jungle, which leads to social dominance orientation. In a meta-analysis of the research, Sibley and Duckitt explained that the social-dominance orientation scale helps to measure the generalization of prejudice and other authoritarian attitudes that can exist within social groups. Although both the right-wing authoritarianism scale and the social-dominance orientation scale can accurately measure authoritarian personalities, the scales usually are not correlated.

Hetherington and Weiler describe the authoritarian personality as one that has a greater need for order, and less willingness to tolerate ambiguity as well as a tendency to rely on established authorities to provide that order. They acknowledge that while everyone seeks to bring some semblance of order to their world, non-authoritarian personalities are more likely to use concepts like fairness and equality, instead of the time-honored texts, conventions or leaders that are more common among authoritarian personalities. They also note that almost everyone becomes more authoritarian when they feel threat, anxiety or fatigue, as the emotional, reactive parts of the brain crowd out cognitive abilities. They also assert that scholars do not know whether to consider authoritarianism a personality trait, an attitude or an ideology.

== Prevalence ==
=== Western countries ===
In 2021, Morning Consult (an American data intelligence company) published the results of a survey measuring the levels of authoritarianism in adults in America and seven other Western countries. The study used Bob Altemeyer's Right-Wing Authoritarianism ("RWA") scale, but they omitted the following two statements from Altemeyer's scale: (1) "The established authorities generally turn out to be right about things, while the radicals and protestors are usually just "loud mouths" showing off their ignorance"; and (2) "Women should have to promise to obey their husbands when they get married." Morning Consult's scale thus had just 20 items, with a score range of 20 to 180 points. Morning Consult found that 25.6% of American adults qualify as "high RWA" (scoring between 111 and 180 points), while 13.4% of American adults qualify as "low RWA" (scoring 20 to 63 points).

Prevalence among adults in Western countries 2021 Morning Consult survey
	Low RWA	High RWA
US	13.4%	25.6%
UK	13.6%	10.4%
Germany	17.4%	6.7%
France	10.2%	10.7%
Spain	17.9%	9.2%
Italy	17.9%	12.9%
Australia	17.1%	12.9%
Canada	21.3%	13.4%

=== United States ===
In a 2009 book, Marc J. Hetherington and Jonathan D. Weiler identified evangelical Protestants as the most authoritarian of voting blocs in the United States. Furthermore, the former Confederate states (i.e. "the South") showed higher levels of authoritarianism than the rest. Rural populations tend to be more authoritarian than urban ones. People who preferred simple problems to complex ones, had less formal education, and those scoring lower in political knowledge also tended to score higher in authoritarianism. The authoritarianism levels of these demographics were assessed with four items that appeared in the 2004 American National Election Studies survey:

1. Please tell me which one you think is more important for a child to have: INDEPENDENCE or RESPECT FOR ELDERS
2. Please tell me which one you think is more important for a child to have: CURIOSITY or GOOD MANNERS
3. Please tell me which one you think is more important for a child to have: OBEDIENCE or SELF-RELIANCE
4. Please tell me which one you think is more important for a child to have: BEING CONSIDERATE or WELL BEHAVED

These questions were designed to force a choice, not unlike in politics, when voters are forced to choose between competing values. Some respondents chose both responses to some of the questions, and the four questions are averaged together, with a score of 1 meaning they answered all four questions with a more authoritarian response and 0 with a less authoritarian response. Half of the Americans surveyed scored .75 or higher, indicating that the average American had a more authoritarian disposition in 2004.

Average authoritarianism by relevant party coalition groups
Group	Mean authoritarianism (2004 data)
Religion	
Evangelical Protestant	0.709
Catholic	0.571
Mainline Protestant	0.530
Secular	0.481
Jewish	0.383
Church attendance
Weekly or more	0.689
Less than weekly	0.549
Region	
South (Note: The states that constituted the now-defunct Confederacy.)	0.657
Non-south	0.547
Population density	
Rural	0.603
Small town	0.584
Suburb	0.524
Large city	0.502
Inner city	0.549
Education
Less than high school	0.754
High school degree	0.657
Some college	0.590
College degree	0.505
Graduate degree	0.373

== See also ==
- Anti-authoritarianism
- Authoritarian leadership style
- Coercion
- Conformity
- Control freak
- Corpse-like obedience
- Disciplinarian
- Dominance hierarchy
- Dominator culture
- Fascist (insult)
- Freudo-Marxism
- Homo Sovieticus / Mankurt
- Integrated threat theory
- Narcissistic personality disorder
- Obsessive–compulsive personality disorder
- Police brutality
- Political strongman
- Psychological abuse
- Regality theory
- Social dominance theory
- Stanford prison experiment
- Sycophancy
- Tyranny of the majority
- Workplace bullying

== Bibliography ==
- Adorno, Theodor W, Else Frenkel Brunswik, Daniel J. Levinson and Nevitt R. Sanford. The Authoritarian Personality. Norton Library, 1969 (1950).
- Marc J. Hetherington; Jonathan D. Weiler (2009). Authoritarianism and Polarization in American Politics. Cambridge University Press. ISBN 978-0-511-65165-6.
