= Hate group =

Collective united by hatred against others

Flags commonly used by hate groups include (clockwise from top-left): the white supremacist Celtic cross, the Nazi flag, the SS flag, and the Confederate battle flag

A hate group is a social group that advocates and practices hatred, animosity, hostility, malice, and/or violence towards members of a race, ethnicity, nation, religion, gender, gender identity, sexual orientation, or any other designated sector of society.

According to the United States Federal Bureau of Investigation (FBI), a hate group's "primary purpose is to promote animosity, hostility, and malice against persons belonging to a race, religion, disability, sexual orientation, or ethnicity/national origin which differs from that of the members of the organization."

== Monitoring ==
In the US, the FBI does not publish a list of hate groups, and it also says that "investigations are only conducted when a threat or advocacy of force is made; when the group has the apparent ability to carry out the proclaimed act; and when the act would constitute a potential violation of federal law". The FBI maintains statistics on hate crimes.

Two private American non-profit organizations that monitor intolerance and hate groups are the Anti-Defamation League (ADL) and the Southern Poverty Law Center (SPLC). They maintain lists of what they deem to be hate groups, supremacist groups and antisemitic, anti-government or extremist groups that have committed hate crimes. The SPLC's definition of a "hate group" includes any group with beliefs or practices that attack or malign an entire class of people—particularly when the characteristics being maligned are immutable. However, at least for the SPLC, inclusion of a group in the list "does not imply a group advocates or engages in violence or other criminal activity." According to USA Today, their list ranges from "white supremacists to black nationalists, neo-Nazis to neo-Confederates."

The Canadian Anti-Hate Network is a nonprofit organization that monitors hate groups in Canada.

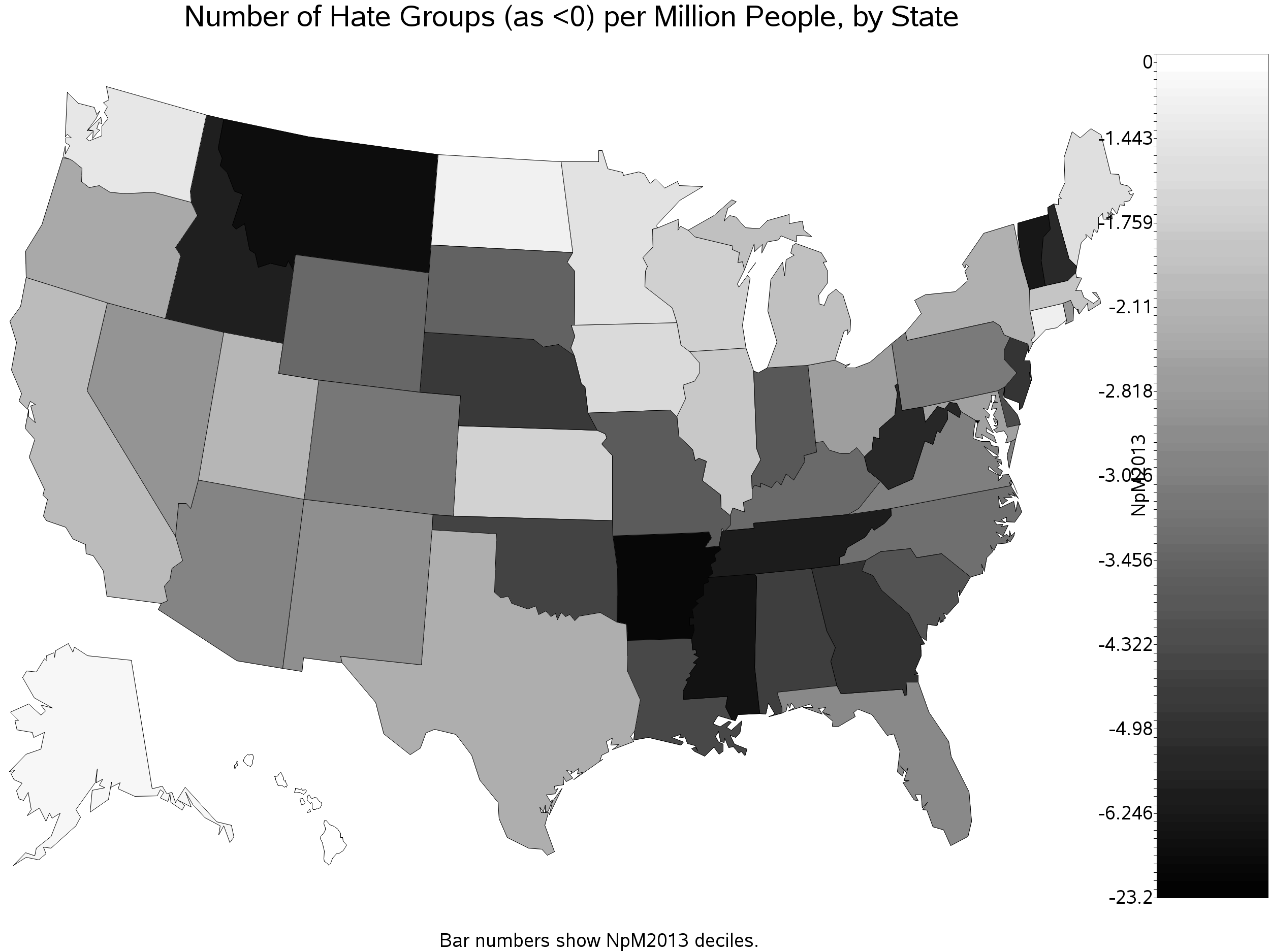
Number of SPLC hate groups per million, as of 2013

According to the SPLC, from 2000 to 2008, hate group activity saw a 50 percent increase in the US, with a total of 926 active groups. In 2019, the organization's report showed a total of 1,020 hate groups, the highest number in 20 years, and a 7% increase from 2017 to 2018. The previous high was 1,018 in 2011, and the recent low point was 2014, when the list included 784 groups. A rise in white nationalist groups from 100 in 2017 to 148 in 2018 was the most significant increase in the 2019 report.

Since 2010 the term alt-right, short for "alternative right", has come into usage. This broad term includes a range of people who reject mainstream conservatism in favor of forms of conservatism that may embrace implicit or explicit racism or white supremacy. The alt-right is described as being "a weird mix of old-school neo-Nazis, conspiracy theorists, anti-globalists, and young right-wing internet trolls—all united in the belief that white male identity is under attack by multicultural, "politically correct" forces."

== Violence and hate crimes ==
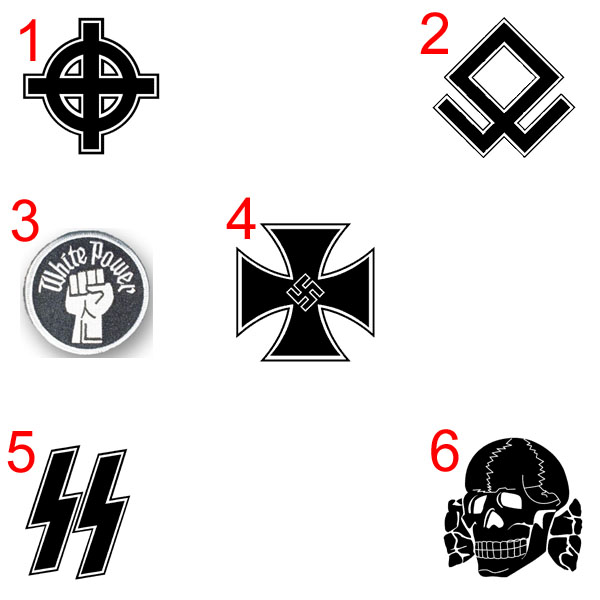
Examples of hate group symbols: 1. the white nationalist Celtic cross; 2. the Winged Odal; 3. the white power raised fist; 4. the Iron Cross with the Nazi swastika; 5. the SS Sig runes; 6. the SS Totenkopf

Four categories which are associated with hate groups' propensity for violence are: organizational capacity, organizational constituency, strategic connectivity, and structural arrangement. The larger an extremist group is and the longer it has existed, it is more prone to engage in violence. Regionally, hate groups which are based in the West and the Northeast are more likely to engage in violence than those hate groups which are based in the South. If a group has a charismatic leader, it is more likely to be violent. Groups that share conflict-based relationships with other groups are more likely to engage in extreme violence. The amount of ideological literature which a group publishes is linked to significant decreases in a group's violent behavior, with more literature linked to lower levels of violence.

The California Association for Human Relations Organizations (CAHRO) asserts that hate groups such as the Ku Klux Klan (KKK) and White Aryan Resistance (WAR) preach violence against racial, religious, sexual and other minorities in the United States. Joseph E. Agne argues that hate-motivated violence is a result of the successes of the civil rights movement, and he asserts that the KKK has resurfaced and new hate groups have formed. Agne argues that it is a mistake to underestimate the strength of the hate-violence movement, its apologists and its silent partners.

In the US, crimes that "manifest evidence of prejudice based on race, religion, sexual orientation, or ethnicity, including the crimes of murder and nonnegligent manslaughter; forcible rape; robbery; aggravated assault; burglary; larceny-theft; motor vehicle theft; arson; simple assault; intimidation; and destruction, damage or vandalism of property", directed at the government, an individual, a business, or institution, involving hate groups and hate crimes, may be investigated as acts of domestic terrorism.

== Hate speech ==
After World War II and The Holocaust, Germany found it necessary to criminalize Volksverhetzung ("incitement to hatred") in order to prevent a resurgence of fascism.

Counter-terrorism expert Ehud Sprinzak defines verbal violence as "the use of extreme language against an individual or a group that either implies a direct threat that physical force will be used against them, or is seen as an indirect call for others to use it." Sprinzak argues that verbal violence is often a substitute for real violence, and that the verbalization of hate has the potential to incite people who are incapable of distinguishing between real and verbal violence to engage in actual violence.

People tend to judge the offensiveness of hate speech on a gradient depending on how public the speech is and what group it targets. Although people's opinions of hate speech are complex, they typically consider public speech targeting ethnic minorities to be the most offensive.

Historian Daniel Goldhagen, discussing antisemitic hate groups, argues that we should view verbal violence as "an assault in its own right, having been intended to produce profound damage—emotional, psychological, and social—to the dignity and honor of the Jews. The wounds that people suffer by ... such vituperation ... can be as bad as ... [a] beating."

In the mid-1990s, the popularity of the Internet brought new international exposure to many organizations, including groups with beliefs such as white supremacy, neo-Nazism, homophobia, Holocaust denial and Islamophobia. Several white supremacist groups have founded websites dedicated to attacking their perceived enemies. In 1996, the Simon Wiesenthal Center of Los Angeles asked Internet access providers to adopt a code of ethics that would prevent extremists from publishing their ideas online. In 1996, the European Commission formed the Consultative Commission on Racism and Xenophobia (CRAX), a pan-European group which was tasked to "investigate and, using legal means, stamp out the current wave of racism on the Internet."

== Religious hate groups ==
The Southern Poverty Law Center (SPLC) has designated several Christian groups as hate groups, including the American Family Association, the Family Research Council, Abiding Truth Ministries, American Vision, the Chalcedon Foundation, the Dove World Outreach Center, the Traditional Values Coalition and the Westboro Baptist Church. Some conservatives have criticized the SPLC for its inclusion of certain Christian groups, such as the Family Research Council, on its list.

The SPLC classifies the Nation of Islam (NOI) as a hate group under the black separatist category and the Israelite School of Universal Practical Knowledge (ISUPK) as a hate group under the black supremacist category. Members of the NOI believe that a black scientist named Yakub created a race of White devils, who are considered the progenitors of White people, on the Greek island of Patmos. Historically a black-only group, White adherents now form a small part of the NOI membership. Alongside the ISUPK, numerous other sects and organizations within the Black Hebrew Israelite movement expound extremist, black supremacist, religious antisemitic, and anti-White racist beliefs, as well as homophobic, transphobic, and sexist beliefs.

The White supremacist religious group which is currently named the Creativity Movement (formerly the World Church of the Creator), led by Matthew F. Hale, is associated with violence and bigotry. The Aryan Nations is another religiously-based White supremacist hate group.

The Westboro Baptist Church is considered a hate group by multiple sources and the WBC is monitored as such by the Anti-Defamation League and the Southern Poverty Law Center. The church has been involved in actions against gay people since at least 1991, when it sought a crackdown on homosexual activity at Gage Park six blocks northwest of the church. In addition to conducting anti-gay protests at military funerals, the organization pickets celebrity funerals and public events. Protests have also been held against Jews and Roman Catholics, and some protests have included WBC members stomping on the American flag or flying the flag upside down on a flagpole. The church also has made statements such as "thank God for dead soldiers", "God blew up the troops", and "God hates America." The church has faced several accusations of brainwashing and has been criticized as a cult because of its provocative stance against homosexuality and the United States, and it has been condemned by many mainstream LGBT rights opponents as well as by LGBT rights supporters.

== Misogynistic hate groups ==
Misogynist hate groups which target women, particularly those groups whose members mostly consist of young men who include pickup artists, incels and hardline anti-woman groups, are sources of concern to some experts. Using recruitment techniques which are similar to those which are used by far-right extremist groups, they target teenagers and vulnerable young men, their recruitment tactics include the use of methods which are akin to grooming. UK author Laura Bates believes that some of these groups should be classified as misogynist terrorist groups. The Proud Boys, which, according to the Southern Poverty Law Center is known for its misogynistic rhetoric, has been designated as a domestic terrorist group in Canada.

== Internet hate groups ==
Traditionally, hate groups recruited members and spread extremist messages by word of mouth, or through the distribution of flyers and pamphlets. In contrast, the Internet allows hate group members from all over the world to engage in real-time conversations. The Internet has been a boon for hate groups in terms of promotion, recruitment and expansion of their base to include younger audiences. An Internet hate group does not have to be part of a traditional faction such as the Ku Klux Klan.

While many hate sites are explicitly antagonistic or violent, others may appear patriotic or benign, and this façade may contribute to the appeal of the groups. Hate group websites work towards the following goals: to educate group members and the public, to encourage participation, to claim a divine calling and privilege, and to accuse out-groups (e.g. the government or the media). Groups that work effectively towards these goals via an online presence tend to strengthen their sense of identity, decrease the threat levels from out-groups, and recruit more new members.

The Simon Wiesenthal Center (SWC), in its 2009 iReport, identified more than 10,000 problematic hate and terrorist websites and other Internet postings. The report includes hate websites, social networks, blogs, newsgroups, YouTube and other video sites. The findings illustrate that as the Internet continues to grow, extremists find new ways to seek validation of their hateful agendas and recruit members.

Creators of hate pages and groups on Facebook choose their target, set up their page or group, and then recruit members. Anyone can create a Facebook group and invite followers to post comments, add pictures and participate in discussion boards. A Facebook page is similar, with the exception that one must "like" the page in order to become a member. Because of the ease of creating and joining such groups, many so-called hate groups exist only in cyberspace. United Patriots Front, an internet-based Australian far-right anti-immigration and neo-nazi organization formed in 2015 has been described as a hate group.

== Psychology of hate groups ==
Hateful intergroup conflict may be motivated by "in-group love," a desire to positively contribute to the group to which one belongs, or "out-group hate," a desire to injure a foreign group. Both individuals and groups are more motivated by "in-group love" than "out-group hate," even though both motivations might advance a group's status. This preference is especially salient when a group is not situated in a competitive position against another. This partiality towards cooperative behavior suggests that intergroup conflict might decline if group members devoted more energy to positive in-group improvements than to out-group competition. Groups formed around a set of moral codes are more likely than non-morality-based groups to exhibit "out-group hate" as a response to their especially strong sense of "in-group love."

Intergroup threat occurs when one group's interests threaten another group's goals and well-being. Intergroup threat theories provide a framework for intergroup biases and aggression.

One type of intergroup threat theory, realistic group conflict theory, addresses competition between groups by positing that when two groups are competing for limited resources, one group's potential success is at odds with the other's interests, which leads to negative out-group attitudes. If groups have the same goal, their interactions will be positive, but opposing goals will worsen intergroup relations. Intergroup conflict may increase in-group unity, leading to a larger disparity and more conflict between groups.

Symbolic threat theory proposes that intergroup bias and conflict result from conflicting ideals, not from perceived competition or opposing goals. Biases based on symbolic threat tend to be stronger predictors of practical behavior towards out-groups than biases based on realistic threat.

Realistic group conflict theory and symbolic threat theory are, in some cases, compatible. Integrated-threat theory recognizes that conflict can arise from a combination of intergroup dynamics and classifies threats into four types: realistic threat, symbolic threat, intergroup anxiety, and negative stereotypes. Intergroup threat theories provide a framework for intergroup biases and aggression. Intergroup anxiety refers to a felt uneasiness around members of other groups, which is predictive of biased attitudes and behaviors. Negative stereotypes are also correlated with these behaviors, causing threat based on negative expectations about an out-group.

According to the 7-stage hate model, a hate group, if unimpeded, passes through seven successive stages. In the first four stages, hate groups vocalize their beliefs and in the last three stages, they act on their beliefs. Factors that contribute to a group's likelihood to act include the vulnerability of its members as well as its reliance on symbols and mythologies. This model points to a transition period that exists between verbal violence and acting out that violence, separating hardcore haters from rhetorical haters. Thus, hate speech is seen as a prerequisite of hate crimes, and as a condition of their possibility.

Hate group intervention is most possible if a group has not yet passed from the speech to the action stage, and interventions on immature hate groups are more effective than those that are firmly established. Intervention and rehabilitation is most effective when the one investigating a hate group can identify and deconstruct personal insecurities of group members, which in turn contribute to the weakness of the group. Perhaps most critical to combating group hate is to prevent the recruitment of new members by supporting those who are most susceptible, especially children and youth, in developing a positive self-esteem and a humanized understanding of out-groups.

== Conceptual criticism ==
The concept of hate groups has been criticised as being arbitrarily and incoherently defined, as hatred can be promoted against a theoretically unlimited number of groups yet only a select few protected characteristics are included. Choosing to designate specific groups as hate groups but not others thus becomes a rhetorical device to pathologize certain groups as deviant rather than a coherent concept. Hate groups are tracked by groups such as the SPLC and ADL, but the lack of a clear definition means these measures run the risk of simply being the opinion of private organisations.

== See also ==
- Antisemitism in Islam
- Ethnic cleansing
- Ethnic conflict
- Ethnic violence
- Ethnocide
- Far-right politics
- Far-right subcultures
- Fascism
- Fundamentalism
- Gendercide
- Genocide
- Hate crime
- Hate media
- Hate speech
- Hate studies
- Identity politics
- Italian fascism
- Islamic terrorism
- Islamic extremism
- Nazism
- Neo-Confederates
- Neo-fascism
- Neo-Nazism
- Supremacism
- Terrorism
- White nationalism
- Jewish supremacy
- Kahanism
