= Right-wing authoritarianism =

Interrelated attitudinal clusters

In psychology, right-wing authoritarianism (RWA) is a set of attitudes describing somebody who is more compliant to their authority figures, acts more strongly in their name, and is conformist in thought and behavior. The prevalence of this attitude in a population varies from culture to culture, as a person's upbringing and education play a strong role in determining whether somebody develops this sort of worldview.

Right-wing authoritarianism was defined by Bob Altemeyer as a refinement of the research of Theodor Adorno. Adorno was the first to propose the existence of an authoritarian personality as part of an attempt to explain the rise of fascism and the Holocaust, but his theory fell into disfavor because it was associated with Freudian psychoanalysis. Altemeyer felt that Adorno was on to something, and so developed a more scientifically rigorous theory.

The RWA scale was designed to measure authoritarianism in North America. It has proven to be similarly reliable in English-speaking countries such as Australia, but less effective in other countries such as France due to cultural differences and translation issues.

== Definition ==
Bob Altemeyer, the Canadian-American social psychologist who first coined the term and its meaning in 1981, defined right-wing authoritarian as someone who exhibits:

1. a high degree of submission to the authorities who are perceived to be established and legitimate in the society in which one lives.
2. a general aggressiveness, directed against various persons, that is perceived to be sanctioned by established authorities.
3. a high degree of adherence to the social conventions that are perceived to be endorsed by society and its established authorities.

In his writings, Altemeyer sometimes refers to right-wing authoritarians as "authoritarian followers". This is to emphasize that he is not speaking of authoritarian leaders, which is the more commonly understood meaning of "authoritarian". Altemeyer refers to authoritarian leaders by the term "social dominator", and he has written extensively on the relationship between authoritarian followers and social dominators.

=== Submissiveness ===
Right-wing authoritarians tend to accept what their leaders say is true and readily comply with their commands. They believe that respecting authority is an important moral virtue that everyone in the community must hold. They tend to place strict limits on how far the authorities can be criticized, and believe that the critics are troublemakers who do not know what they are talking about. RWAs are extremely submissive even to authority figures who are dishonest, corrupt, and inept. They will insist that their leaders are honest, caring, and competent, dismissing any evidence to the contrary as either false or inconsequential. They believe that the authorities have the right to make their own decisions, even if that includes breaking the rules that they impose on everyone else.

The "leader" is somebody whom the authoritarian believes has the moral right (if not legal right) to rule his society. Right-wing authoritarians are highly submissive to authority figures whom they consider legitimate, and conversely can be very rebellious towards authority figures they consider illegitimate.

=== Aggression ===
Authoritarians can behave very aggressively towards people whom their leaders have marked as enemies, or whom the authoritarians perceive to be threats to the proper social order. Anyone can become the target of authoritarian aggression, but it is more frequently outsiders or socially unconventional people who are targeted. Examples include communists and Jews in Nazi Germany, and feminists and homosexuals in the United States. But an authoritarian is more likely than a non-authoritarian to attack even conventional people if his authority figures sanction such an attack. Altemeyer has further observed that authoritarians prefer to attack when the odds are in their favor, going so far as to call authoritarians "cowardly" because they typically attack victims who cannot defend themselves, such as women.

The factor that best instigates authoritarian aggression is fear, particularly fear of people. This can include violent people such as bullies, terrorists, and foreign invaders, but it can also include people they perceive as morally degenerate, such as homosexuals and atheists.

Authoritarians strongly believe in punishment. All things being equal, they tend to recommend harsher punishments than non-authoritarian judges would. They are more in favor of corporal punishment and the death penalty. But they tend to be forgiving or even approving if the crime was committed by a high-status individual against an unconventional or lower-status victim. In this regard, authoritarian aggression is about enforcing social hierarchies and norms. Examples cited by Altemeyer include a policeman beating up an "uppity" protester, an accountant assaulting a beggar, or an anti-gay protester assaulting a gay rights activist.

=== Conventionalism ===
Authoritarians have a strong commitment to the traditional norms of society and consider conformity to be a moral imperative for all members of the group. Authoritarians want to be like everyone else and everyone to be like them.

== Assessment ==
Right-wing authoritarianism is measured by the RWA scale, which uses a Likert scale response. Subjects are given a questionnaire with 22 statements, and for each statement on the questionnaire, they must express how far they agree with the statement with one of these ratings: "very strongly disagree", "strongly disagree", "moderately disagree", "slightly disagree", "completely neutral", "slightly agree", "moderately agree", "strongly agree", and "very strongly agree". The examiner will then score each response according to how authoritarian it is, ranging from 1 to 9. Some of these statements are authoritarian in nature while others are liberal, so the examiner scores them differently. If the subject "very strongly agrees" with question #4, the examiner will give him 1 point because it is a liberal statement, and if he "very strongly agrees" with #3, the examiner will give him 9 points because it is an authoritarian statement. This mixture of authoritarian and liberal statements is designed to prevent test subjects from succumbing to acquiescence bias.

1. The established authorities generally turn out to be right about things, while the radicals and protestors are usually just "loud mouths" showing off their ignorance.
2. Women should have to promise to obey their husbands when they get married.
3. Our country desperately needs a mighty leader who will do what has to be done to destroy the radical new ways and sinfulness that are ruining us.
4. Gays and lesbians are just as healthy and moral as anybody else.
5. It is always better to trust the judgment of the proper authorities in government and religion than to listen to the noisy rabble-rousers in our society who are trying to create doubt in people's minds.
6. Atheists and others who have rebelled against the established religions are no doubt every bit as good and virtuous as those who attend church regularly.
7. The only way our country can get through the crisis ahead is to get back to our traditional values, put some tough leaders in power, and silence the troublemakers spreading bad ideas.
8. There is absolutely nothing wrong with nudist camps.
9. Our country needs free thinkers who have the courage to defy traditional ways, even if this upsets many people.
10. Our country will be destroyed someday if we do not smash the perversions eating away at our moral fiber and traditional beliefs.
11. Everyone should have their own lifestyle, religious beliefs, and sexual preferences, even if it makes them different from everyone else.
12. The "old-fashioned ways" and the "old-fashioned values" still show the best way to live.
13. You have to admire those who challenged the law and the majority's view by protesting for women's abortion rights, for animal rights, or to abolish school prayer.
14. What our country really needs is a strong, determined leader who will crush evil, and take us back to our true path.
15. Some of the best people in our country are those who are challenging our government, criticizing religion, and ignoring the "normal way things are supposed to be done."
16. God's laws about abortion, pornography and marriage must be strictly followed before it is too late, and those who break them must be strongly punished.
17. There are many radical, immoral people in our country today, who are trying to ruin it for their own godless purposes, whom the authorities should put out of action.
18. A "woman's place" should be wherever she wants to be. The days when women are submissive to their husbands and social conventions belong strictly in the past.
19. Our country will be great if we honor the ways of our forefathers, do what the authorities tell us to do, and get rid of the "rotten apples" who are ruining everything.
20. There is no "one right way" to live life; everybody has to create their own way.
21. Homosexuals and feminists should be praised for being brave enough to defy "traditional family values."
22. This country would work a lot better if certain groups of troublemakers would just shut up and accept their group's traditional place in society.

Psychometrically, the RWA scale was intended as a significant improvement over the F-scale which was the original measure of Adorno's concept of the authoritarian personality. The F-scale was worded so that agreement always indicated an authoritarian response, thus leaving it susceptible to the acquiescence response bias. The RWA scale is intended to be more balanced with an equal number of pro and anti authoritarian statements. The RWA scale also has excellent internal consistency, with coefficient alpha typically measuring between 0.85 and 0.94. The RWA scale has been modified over the years as many of the items lost their social significance as society changed. The current version is 22 items long.

Although Altemeyer has continually updated the scale, researchers in different domains have tended to prefer particular versions. In the social psychology of religion, the 1992 version of the scale is still commonly used. In addition, the length of the earlier versions (30 items) led many researchers to develop shorter versions of the scale. Some of those are published, but many researchers simply select a subset of items to use in their research, a practice that Altemeyer strongly criticizes.

The uni-dimensionality of the scale has also been challenged recently. Florian Funke showed that it is possible to extract the three underlying dimensions of RWA if the double- and triple-barreled nature of the items is removed. Given the possibility of underlying dimensions emerging from the scale, it is then the case that the scale is no longer balanced since all the items primarily capturing authoritarian aggression are pro-trait worded (higher scores mean more authoritarianism) and all the items primarily measuring conventionalism are con-trait worded (higher scores mean less authoritarianism). Work by Winnifred R. Louis, Kenneth I. Mavor and Chris G. Sibley recently demonstrated that the existence of two or three factors in the RWA scale reflects real differences in these dimensions rather than acquiescence response bias.

== Prevalence ==
=== Western countries ===
In 2021, Morning Consult (an American data intelligence company) published the results of a survey measuring the levels of authoritarianism in adults in America and seven other Western countries. The study used Bob Altemeyer's right-wing authoritarianism scale, but they omitted the following two statements from Altemeyer's scale: (1) "The established authorities generally turn out to be right about things, while the radicals and protestors are usually just 'loud mouths' showing off their ignorance."; and (2) "Women should have to promise to obey their husbands when they get married." Morning Consult's scale thus had just 20 items, with a score range of 20 to 180 points. Morning Consult found that 25.6% of American adults qualify as "high RWA" (scoring between 111 and 180 points), while 13.4% of American adults qualify as "low RWA" (scoring 20 to 63 points). Altemeyer praised the Morning Consult survey as "the best study ever done on authoritarianism".

Prevalence among adults in Western countries 2021 Morning Consult survey
| | Low RWA | High RWA | Survey reliability (Cronbach's alpha) |
|---|---|---|---|
| US | 13.4% | 25.6% | 0.8962 |
| UK | 13.6% | 10.4% | 0.8814 |
| Germany | 17.4% | 6.7% | 0.8184 |
| France | 10.2% | 10.7% | 0.7472 |
| Spain | 17.9% | 9.2% | 0.8396 |
| Italy | 17.9% | 12.9% | 0.8426 |
| Australia | 17.1% | 12.9% | 0.8922 |
| Canada | 21.3% | 13.4% | 0.9040 |

=== Japan ===
In 2021, three researchers from Kyoto University published a paper containing a Japanese translation of Altemeyer's RWA scale. The researchers wrote that prior to this, there were no standardized translations of the RWA scale into Japanese.

== Psychological comorbidities ==
=== Incorrect inferences ===
Right-wing authoritarians are said to have trouble deciding what facts are valid or irrelevant, and making logical deductions. Consider the following syllogism:

All fish live in the sea.
Sharks live in the sea.
Therefore, sharks are fish.

Although the conclusion of the syllogism happens to be correct, the reasoning before it is incorrect. Sharks are indeed fish, but not because they happen to live in the sea; whales also live in the sea, and are not fish. Right-wing authoritarians are far more likely to incorrectly judge the above syllogism to be correct, according to the source. Because they liked the conclusion, they might assume that the reasoning that led to it was correct.

=== Dogmatism ===
Authoritarians tend to hold stubbornly to their beliefs even when presented with evidence that suggests their beliefs are wrong. This is particularly true concerning beliefs that underpin the identity of the group. If anything, when confronted with contradictory evidence, their beliefs are often reinforced.

=== Compartmentalized thinking ===
In one of his experiments, Bob Altemeyer presented his students a booklet which contained the following statements on different pages:

- "When it comes to love, men and women with opposite points of view are attracted to each other."
- "Birds of a feather flock together when it comes to love."

His students with authoritarian personalities were more likely to agree with both statements even though they are completely contradictory.

Their tendency to compartmentalize information makes it hard to change the cherished opinion of a high-RWA by telling them evidence that contradicts their beliefs. They will ignore the contradiction even if they accept the evidence as factual.

=== Ignorance ===
Altemeyer has observed that authoritarians are often very ignorant when it comes to both general knowledge and current events.

=== Lack of self-awareness ===
Authoritarians tend to be lacking in general knowledge, particularly on issues with which they disagree.

Authoritarians also are often unaware of just how different they are from most people. They tend to believe they are very average. Altemeyer has found that authoritarians in America underestimate how prejudiced and conformist they are compared to the majority of Americans. Altemeyer has also observed that when he lectures about the psychology of right-wing authoritarians to his students, the RWA students in his class fail to recognize themselves in his description. Altemeyer believes the tendency of authoritarians to avoid anyone who is not like them reinforces their belief that they are normal. They have relatively little contact with normal people.

=== Sensitivity to disgust ===
Right-wing authoritarians were shown to have a higher level of disgust compared to those who are not. The correlation between moral disgust and disgust from body odour were used in a study to predict the likelihood of an individual's political standing using their sensitivity to body odour. Participants who reported higher sensitivity to body odour were more likely to agree with right-wing–associated statements on a shortened version of the RWA scale.

== Relationship with social dominators ==
Jim Sidanius and Felicia Pratto created the social dominance orientation (SDO) scale, which describes people who crave power over others. Bob Altemeyer has used the SDO scale to study the relationship between authoritarian followers and authoritarian leaders.

Authoritarian followers are attracted to domineering leaders. This is measured in one of the items on the RWA scale: "Our country desperately needs a mighty leader who will do what has to be done to destroy the radical new ways and sinfulness that are ruining us." They are more likely to obey and approve of the leader's unethical actions than a low-RWA. And likewise, social dominators seeking power like to appeal to authoritarians because their loyalty is easy to acquire and hold if the SD just tells them what they want to hear, and they are gullible and will turn a blind eye to his indiscretions.

Social dominators differ from authoritarian followers in several important ways. Both personality types demand loyalty from others, but RWAs usually reciprocate that loyalty whereas SDs have a tendency to betray their followers when it suits them.

Social dominators lack the irrational thinking patterns common to RWAs, such as compartmentalized thinking and hypocrisy. They might often spout contradictory and illogical things in order to manipulate their RWA followers, but they are usually aware of the bad logic in their arguments, they do not care as long as it gets them what they want. Social dominators are also more self-aware than RWAs. For instance, RWAs often do not realize how abnormally prejudiced they are, whereas SDs often do (and are comfortable with that).

The aggression of RWAs is mainly motivated by fear and by sanction by authorities, whereas the aggression of social dominators is motivated by a general desire to dominate others. Altemeyer has found that today in America, SDs are more hostile to racial minorities than RWAs, because racism has become less socially acceptable and even illegal, and RWAs to an extent want to conform to this norm even if it clashes with their natural ethnocentrism.

Altemeyer believes this relationship explains why autocratic countries tend to have oppressive, highly hierarchical societies, where women, homosexuals, and religious minorities are oppressed; and higher levels of corruption. Generally speaking, autocratic rulers hold power through the support of a smaller fraction of their citizens than leaders in democratic countries do. Under these circumstances, appealing to RWAs is an effective strategy because their loyalty is easy to acquire and hold. By contrast, leaders in democratic countries (such as France and Canada) need to build a broader support base among the citizens to hold onto power, and RWAs are too few in number to form a sufficient base. The democratic leader is forced to consider the desires of centrists and liberals, and such citizens demand tolerance, liberty, and low corruption.

== Left-wing authoritarians ==
In some of his writings, Bob Altemeyer defines a right-wing authoritarian as someone who submits to the established authorities in society, whereas a left-wing authoritarian submits to authorities who want to overthrow the establishment. This distinction is one of circumstance, not personality. Altemeyer asserts the Nazis were left-wing authoritarians before they rose to power, and after they took power they became right-wing authoritarians.

The existence of communist countries such as the Soviet Union and the People's Republic of China raised the question of whether there is such a thing as "left-wing authoritarians", since these countries were highly authoritarian yet also left-wing. The question that psychologists therefore asked was whether authoritarian individuals in communist countries are psychologically the same as right-wing authoritarians in America, or whether they are different enough to warrant a distinct category of their own.

=== Rigidity of thought ===
It has been suggested that the political left and right differ in terms of their cognitive rigidity, at least partially due to the influence of authoritarianism, as RWA tends to promote rigid thinking and cognition, although evidence on this is unclear. For example, a literature review by John Jost found that the evidence supported the hypothesis that individuals on the political right are uniformly more rigid in their thinking than those on the political left, regardless of how strong their beliefs are. Conversely, research and meta-analysis by Thomas Costello found that the relationship between cognitive rigidity and political orientation was heterogeneous in terms of its strength and effect sizes, especially when dealing with political extremism and depending on whether social and economic ideologies were being examined. What these findings mean is also uncertain, as even if right-wing individuals do possess greater cognitive rigidity relative to left-wing individuals, it is not clear that this indicates high cognitive rigidity in absolute terms.

== Research ==
According to research by Altemeyer, right-wing authoritarians tend to exhibit cognitive errors and symptoms of faulty reasoning. Specifically, they are more likely to make incorrect inferences from evidence and to hold contradictory ideas that result from compartmentalized thinking. They are also more likely to uncritically accept insufficient evidence that supports their beliefs and they are less likely to acknowledge their own limitations. Whether right-wing authoritarians are less intelligent than average is disputed, with Stenner arguing that variables such as high verbal ability (indicative of high cognitive capacity) have a very substantial ameliorative effect in diminishing authoritarian tendencies. However, one study suggested the apparent negative relationship between cognition and RWA could be partially explained by methodological issues. Measured against other factors of personality, authoritarians generally score lower on openness to experience and slightly higher on conscientiousness.

Altemeyer suggested that authoritarian politicians are more likely to be in the Conservative or Reform party in Canada, or the Republican Party in the United States. They generally have a conservative economic philosophy, are highly nationalistic, oppose abortion, support capital punishment, oppose gun control legislation and do not value social equality. The RWA scale reliably correlates with political party affiliation, reactions to Watergate, pro-capitalist attitudes, religious orthodoxy and acceptance of covert governmental activities such as illegal wiretaps.

Authoritarians are generally more favorable to punishment and control than personal freedom and diversity. They are more willing to suspend constitutional guarantees of liberty such as the Bill of Rights. They are more likely to advocate strict, punitive sentences for criminals and report that punishing such people is satisfying for them. They tend to be ethnocentric and prejudiced against racial and ethnic minorities and homosexuals. However, Stenner argues that authoritarians will support programs intended to increase opportunities for minority groups, such as affirmative action, if they believe such programs will lead to greater societal uniformity.

In roleplaying situations, authoritarians tend to seek dominance over others by being competitive and destructive instead of cooperative. In a study by Altemeyer, 68 authoritarians played a three-hour simulation of the Earth's future entitled the Global Change Game. Unlike a comparison game played by individuals with low RWA scores which resulted in world peace and widespread international cooperation, the simulation by authoritarians became highly militarized and eventually entered the stage of nuclear war. By the end of the high RWA game, the entire population of the earth was declared dead.

The vast majority of research on right-wing authoritarianism has been done in the United States and Canada. However, a 2003 cross-cultural study examined the relation between authoritarianism and individualism–collectivism in samples (1,080) from Bulgaria, Canada, Germany, Japan, New Zealand, Poland and the United States. Both at the individual level and the societal level, authoritarianism was correlated with vertical individualism or dominance seeking and vertical or hierarchical collectivism which is the tendency to submit to the demands of one's ingroup. A study done on both Israeli and Palestinian students in Israel found that RWA scores of right-wing party supporters were significantly higher than those of left-wing party supporters and scores of secular subjects were lowest.

Right-wing authoritarianism has been found to correlate only slightly with social dominance orientation (SDO). The two measures can be thought of as two sides of the same coin as RWA provides submissive followers and SDO provides power-seeking leaders.

Some recent research has argued that the association with RWA and prejudice has dominated research into RWA, with recent developments discovering a more complicated relationship.

=== Relationship to personality traits ===
Research comparing RWA with the Big Five personality traits has found that RWA is positively correlated with conscientiousness (r = 0.15) and negatively correlated with openness to experience (r = −0.36). SDO has a somewhat different pattern of correlations with the Big Five, as it is also associated with low openness to experience (r = −0.16), but is not significantly correlated with conscientiousness (r = −0.05) and instead has a negative correlation with agreeableness (r = −0.29). Low openness to experience and high conscientiousness have been found to be predictive of social conformity. People low in openness to experience tend to prefer clear, unambiguous moral rules and are more likely to support the existing social order insofar as it provides clear guidance about social norms for behavior and how the world should be. People low in openness to experience are also more sensitive to threats (both real and symbolic) to the social order and hence tend to view outgroups who deviate from traditional social norms and values as a threat to ingroup norms and values. Conscientiousness is associated with a preference for order, structure and security, hence this might explain the connection with RWA.

== Causes ==
The roots of right-wing authoritarianism are mostly down to genetics, a conclusion that comes from twin studies.

Education levels are also a factor, with a four-year undergraduate education found to lower RWA scores by approximately 10%.

== Criticism and development ==
A recent refinement to this body of research was presented in Karen Stenner's 2005 book, The Authoritarian Dynamic. Stenner argues that RWA is best understood as expressing a dynamic response to external threat, not a static disposition based only on the traits of submission, aggression and conventionalism. Stenner is critical of Altemeyer's social learning interpretation and argues that it cannot account for how levels of authoritarianism fluctuate with social conditions. She argues that the RWA Scale can be viewed as a measure of expressed authoritarianism, but that other measures are needed to assess authoritarian predispositions which interact with threatening circumstances to produce the authoritarian response.

Recent criticism has also come as a result of treating RWA as uni-dimensional even in contexts where it makes no sense to do so. This include RWA being used in regression analyses with fundamentalism as another predictor and attitudes to homosexuality and racism as the outcomes. This research seemed to show that fundamentalism would be associated with reduced racism once the authoritarian component was removed and this was summarized in a recent review of the field. However, since the RWA scale has items that also measure fundamentalist religiosity and attitudes to homosexuality, this undermines the interpretation of such analyses. Even worse is the possibility that the unrecognised dimensionality in RWA can cause a statistical artifact to arise in such regressions which can reduce or even reverse some of the relationships. Mavor and colleagues have argued that this artifact eliminates or even reverses any apparent tendency for fundamentalism to reduce racism once RWA is controlled. The implication is that in some domains such as the social psychology of religion it is not only preferable to think of RWA as consisting of at least two components, but it is essential in order to avoid statistical errors and incorrect conclusions. Several options currently exist for scales that acknowledge at least the two main underlying components in the scale (aggression/submission and conventionalism).

Altemeyer's research on authoritarianism has been challenged by psychologist John J. Ray, who questions the sampling methods used and the ability of the RWA Scale to predict authoritarian behavior and provides evidence that the RWA Scale measures conservatism rather than "directiveness", a construct that John J. Ray invented and that he relates to authoritarianism. However, Ray's approach is a minority position among researchers and other psychologists have found that both the RWA scale and the original F-scale are good predictors of both attitudes and behavior.

In 2012, the American Journal of Political Science published an article discussing the correlation between conservatism and psychoticism which they associated with authoritarianism, among other traits. In 2015, they released an erratum showing mixed correlations.

In 2017, the new regality theory suggested a reinterpretation of RWA in the light of evolutionary psychology. Regality theory agrees that authoritarianism is a dynamic response to external threats, but rather than seeing it as a psychological aberration, regality theory posits that authoritarianism is an evolved response to perceived collective danger. Research suggests that people who score highly on the RWA scale are more likely to view the world as a more dangerous place. The tendency to support a strong leader when faced with common existential threats has contributed to Darwinian fitness in human prehistory because it helped solve the collective action problem in war and suppress free riders. It is argued that regality theory adds a deeper level of analysis to our understanding of authoritarianism and avoids the political bias that the research in the authoritarian personality and RWA is often criticized for.

In 2019, Ronald Inglehart combined RWA with his theory of postmaterialism, arguing that both reflected the tendency of insecure environments to produce individuals whose worldview values conformism over self-expression.

Although some earlier scholars had claimed that a comparable construct of left-wing authoritarianism (LWA) on the political left does not exist and compared the search for LWA to trying to find the Loch Ness monster, more recent work suggests the possibility that LWA does exist and that it predicts similar outcomes as RWA. This has spurred debate about whether liberals might be similarly authoritarian as conservatives.

Honeycutt et al argue that RWA scores may be misrepresented by distribution as high-scorers on the scale may actually have moderate scores and are only "high" relative to lower scorers, rather than scoring high on the scale in any absolute sense. Thus differences between "high" and "low" scorers may be exaggerated. Sibley et al reported in a New Zealand sample that most differences in RWA scores are in the low to moderate range and that true high scoring authoritarians (5 or above on the RWA scale and 1-2 the SDO scale) likely represent only a small percentage of the population, estimated at around 7.6%. The research also found no evidence of Altemeyer's "double-highs" (people scoring 5 or more in both SDO and RWA), though it did find evidence of individuals who scored high in SDO and moderately in RWA, making up an estimated 1.2% of the population. Sibley et al concluded that while they could not rule out the existence of "double-highs", such individuals are likely extremely rare. Individuals uniquely high in RWA may be uncommon due to RWA representing an evolutionary strategy with concomitant fitness trade-offs, resulting in variation in RWA levels. In addition, RWA is subject to behavioural plasticity and thus can be altered due to an individual's life experiences and environmental contexts.

=== ACT Conservatism ===
RWA has been criticized for its unidimensionality. Altemeyer noted in his research that RWA seemed to be made of three distinct clusters of traits, which he called authoritarian aggression, authoritarian submission, and conventionalism. Later researchers have expanded on this by developing multidimensional measures of RWA. One prominent multidimensional measure, closely based of the three clusters Altemeyer noted, is Authoritarianism, Conservatism, and Traditionalism (ACT) Conservatism. ACT Conservatism has been found to be reliably measurable across cultures. Authoritarianism is defined as the tendency to favor stricter rules, norms, and laws and to favor harsher and more punitive punishments for breaking them. Conservatism is defined as the preference for uncritical, accepting, and obedient attitudes toward established authorities and norms as opposed to more questioning or critical attitudes. Traditionalism is defined as favoring lifestyles perceived as traditional or normal over lifestyles perceived as deviant or alternative.

== History ==
The theoretical concept of right-wing authoritarianism was introduced in 1981 by the Canadian-American social psychologist Bob Altemeyer as a refinement of the authoritarian personality theory originally pioneered by University of California, Berkeley, researchers Theodor W. Adorno, Else Frenkel-Brunswik, Daniel Levinson, and Nevitt Sanford.

After extensive questionnaire research and statistical analysis, Altemeyer found that only three of the original nine hypothesized components of the model correlated together: authoritarian submission, authoritarian aggression and conventionalism. Researchers have traditionally assumed that there was just one kind of authoritarian personality, who could be either a follower or a leader. The discovery that followers and leaders are usually different types of authoritarians is based on research done by Sam McFarland. Altemeyer describes another scale called "Social Dominance" which measures how domineering a person is. Altemeyer calls people who score highly on both his "Right-Wing Authoritarian" and "Social Dominance" scales as "Double Highs".

== Politics ==
=== United States ===
Research has shown that, since the 1960s, voters who prefer authoritarian leadership styles are more likely to support Republican candidates. Supporters of U.S. president Donald Trump were more likely than non-Trump-supporting Republicans to score highly on authoritarian aggression and group-based dominance. Furthermore, many left-leaning authoritarians have become less engaged with politics and voting.

A study by Monmouth University found that 40% of people who voted for Trump in the 2020 presidential election scored in the highest quartile on the RWA scale. By contrast, only a negligible number of Joe Biden supporters scored that highly. The same study found that those Trump supporters who scored highly on the RWA scale were more likely than other Trump supporters to endorse conspiracy theories, such as the idea that the election was rigged by the Democratic Party.

According to Karen Stenner, an Australian professor who specializes in authoritarianism, authoritarianism is different from conservatism because authoritarianism reflects aversion to difference across space (i.e. diversity of people and beliefs at a given moment) while conservatism reflects aversion to difference over time (i.e. change). Stenner argues that conservatives will embrace racial diversity, civil liberties and moral freedom to the extent they are already institutionalized authoritatively-supported traditions and are therefore supportive of social stability. Conservatives tend to be drawn to authoritarianism when public opinion is fractious and there is a loss of confidence in public institutions, but in general they value stability and certainty over increased uniformity. However, Stenner says that authoritarians also want difference restricted even when so doing would require significant social change and instability.

While RWA is conventionally associated with right-wing politics, RWA can lead to support for left-wing candidates. Although African Americans are already generally more likely to favor Democratic candidates, African Americans with high RWA scores were more likely to vote for Barack Obama in the 2012 United States presidential election. Low RWA African Americans were found to have about a 50% chance of voting for Obama, whereas high RWA African Americans were found to have about an 85% chance of voting for Obama. This is hypothesized to be because high RWA individuals support and defend the person they view as their "rightful leader," regardless of who is legally in charge. RWA individuals reject the authority of leaders they do not believe have the "moral right" to be their leader, be it conservatives rejecting the authority of president Barack Obama, or liberals rejecting the authority of conservative politicians.

==== Regional variation ====
The Pell Center at Salve Regina University conducted a nationwide survey to measure the prevalence of RWA in different cultural regions of the United States. The survey used the 3-dimensional ACT Conservatism scale. The regions surveyed were defined as Left Coast, Tidewater, El Norte, New Netherland, Far West, Greater Appalachia, Midlands, Yankeedom, and the Deep South. Participants in the Deep South were found to score much higher than average on all three measures than any other region. Though they scored notably lower on traditionalism than they did on aggressiveness and conservatism. Conversely, the "Left Coast" was found to score significantly lower than average on all three metrics, and scored notably higher on traditionalism than aggressiveness and conservatism.

== See also ==
- Authoritarian conservatism
- Authoritarian personality
- The Authoritarian Personality
- Conformity
- Fascist (insult)
- F-scale (personality test)
- Postmaterialism
- Social dominance orientation
- System justification
