= Regality theory =

Theory aiming to explain cultural differences based on perceived collective danger

The theory of regal and kungic societal structures, or regality theory, is a theory that seeks to explain certain cultural differences based on perceived collective danger and fear.

People will show a psychological preference for a strong leader and strict discipline if they live in a society full of conflict and danger, while people in a peaceful and safe environment will prefer an egalitarian and tolerant culture, according to this theory. The psychological preferences of the individual members of a social group is reflected in the social structure and culture of the whole group. A dangerous and conflict-filled environment will drive the culture in the direction of strict hierarchy and authoritarianism. This type of culture is called regal. The opposite situation is seen in a safe and peaceful environment, where the culture is developing in the direction of egalitarianism and tolerance. This type of culture is called kungic. Most cultures and societies are found somewhere between these two extremes. Both of these societal types may be impacted by other groups, and the likelihood of conflict with neighbor groups. In addressing these psychological response effects on cultural structures, the theory applies at the individual-level as well as the social group-level. Precursors to this regality theory are cultural r/K theory and cultural selection theory.

== Terminology ==
In his work Warlike and Peaceful Societies, Agner Fog explains the labels for the two types of societies. Regal comes from the Latin regalis, meaning "royal" and stands for hierarchical and aggressive societies. Kungic comes from the ǃKung people of Southern Africa, who Fog uses to exemplify an egalitarian and peaceful society.

== Theoretical foundations and conceptual connections ==
Evolutionary psychology is the major discipline that the regal and kungic society theory falls under. Evolutionary psychology focuses on the psychological adaptations thought to be specific to an entire species that are displayed and observed by individuals of the species. These psychological adaptations are then suggested to explain elements of culture in that they are linked to social organization patterns based on the way that the individuals creating and perpetuating the culture are thinking of their surrounding world, which is considered a worldview. The regal and kungic society theory poses that the social group environment triggers psychological adaptations that are meant to address whatever collective dangers come from that environmental setting. The modeling of regality theory is also attributed to evolutionary game theory and biological life history theory. In particular, regality theory is focusing on the free-rider problem in war or intergroup conflict. A strong leader can suppress free riding in war by rewarding brave warriors and punishing defectors. This is an advantage for the whole group because it improves the chances of winning the conflict. Therefore, it is advantageous for all members of the group to support a strong leader in this situation. A strong leader is a disadvantage, however, when there is no conflict and no need for collective action, because a strong and powerful leader may be despotic and take advantage of everybody else. Individuals fighting for the collective social group (parochial altruism or self-sacrifice) can be explained by the regal reaction.

Life history theory's connection to regality theory comes from the shared expectations of reproduction patterns based on ecological settings. This also connects the theory of regal and kungic societal structures to the discipline of evolutionary ecology as both theories are addressing events that are considered the universal stages/events of life across all organisms—birth, reproduction, death.

Other theories that link threat to intolerance and authoritarianism include Integrated threat theory, authoritarianism theory and the theory of tight and loose cultures.

== Agner Fog ==
Agner Fog is considered the main writer and investigator of regality theory. Fog is attributed with coining the term "regality theory." He is currently an associate professor at the Technical University of Denmark (DTU), and has been present at DTU since 1995. In this time, Fog has studied and published works of research that focus on cultural and evolutionary anthropology (includes regality theory), computer science (the field he predominantly lectures), and social systems. Fog has also developed some forms of computer modeling that are meant to model some elements of cultural patterns. He developed this regal and kungic societal patterning theory through the 1990s to the 2010s, but the term "regality theory" is directly used in his 2017 work, Warlike and Peaceful Societies: the Interaction of Genes and Culture. However, first versions of the regal and kungic society theory by Fog are present in his book, Cultural Selection, which was published in 1999. In it, he uses the terms regal and kungic or kalyptic in the identical fashion as his 2017 book.

=== Warlike and peaceful societies: The interaction of genes and culture ===
This is the book that breaks down the theory of regal and kungic societal structures in the greatest detail under the name of "regality theory". This book, published in 2017, is meant to explore the regal and kungic conditions to understand how collective dangers (real or perceived) impact the psychological dispositions of social group members that lead to the preference for conditions of strong leadership and hierarchy or for egalitarian, peaceful social systems. Typical characteristics of regal and kungic societies are summarized in the following table. Societies may be placed on a continuous scale from the extremely regal to the extremely kungic, where most societies are found somewhere between these two extremes.

Regal society	Kungic society
The world is seen as full of dangers and enemies	The world is seen as peaceful and safe with little or no distinction between us and them
A hierarchical political system with a strong leader	A flat and egalitarian political system
Strong feelings of national or tribal identity	High individualism
Strict discipline and punishment of deviants	Lax discipline and high tolerance of deviants
Xenophobia	Tolerance of foreigners
Belief that individuals exist for the benefit of society	Belief that society exists for the benefit of individuals
Strict religion	Religion has little or no disciplining power
Strict sexual morals	High sexual freedom
High birth rate	Low birth rate
Low parental investment, i.e. short childhood and low education	Long childhood and education
Art and music is perfectionist, highly embellished, and follows specific schemes	Art and music express individual fantasy with appreciation of individuality and innovativeness

==== Regal society ====
By this theory of regality, under harsh or hostile environmental conditions, the regal reaction is anticipated. It is the societal pattern that the term "warlike" is referring to. Individuals that live in these settings are likely to prefer an organization where there is a strong leader that is perceived as adequate enough to handle collective danger, whether it is real or perceived. This leadership based condition would then address what is known as the collective action problem. This problem is understood as the need for all members of the collective to behave cooperatively or altruistically where they "fight" for the collective good no matter the individual level cost, which may be resource loss, injury, and/or death, but there is a failure to do this if group level interest are in conflict with the individual's interests. These individual interests are thought to outweigh the cost and potential benefits of group/joint action. Should leadership employ their centralized power well enough across members of the social group, this collective action problem can be addressed and the potential of free-riding is lessened, which eradicates the occurrence of the Prisoner's Dilemma. The prisoner's dilemma, a concept from game theory (and subsequently evolutionary game theory), refers to the expected strategy choices of individuals in reference to obtaining some form of benefit/payoff(s). In this dilemma, there is the defector (cheater) and the cooperator. The idea suggests that individuals will choose to behave (defect/cooperate) based on which choice will most likely incur the greatest payoff and/or lowest cost. The idea of the regal condition/response will have an authoritarian figure strong enough to ensure the cooperation of the social group members as it is perceived such cooperation will ensure the defeat of the collective danger, which is typically war or intergroup conflict. It is mentioned as well that, in this condition, tyranny becomes possible as the collective is upholding a central power that could, by exploiting the fear of the group interference to the collective danger (real or not), monopolize resources and further their power. The characteristics expected in a society at this regal level would include authoritarianism, hierarchy, xenophobia (intolerance to minorities and out-groups), territoriality, and discipline of high degree.

==== Kungic society ====
A kungic society is then the resulting community formation from environments of collective safety and general peace, and is considered the opposite condition to the regal condition, which suggests a dichotomous structure. There is little to no expected, perceived, or real collective danger that would trigger psychological adaptations specific to addressing dangers. The security of resources, territory, and within-group peace would result in the psychological dispositions towards an egalitarian system. The theory poses that there would be greater equality/equity across the group members at this level and that leadership would be little or at least not centralized as in the regal counterpart. In the kungic society, it is also anticipated that tyranny would not be possible, as the collective would not tolerate an opportunity for a centralized power to exploit resources and members of the group for their own self-enrichment. The characteristics expected for this societal pattern would include an egalitarian system, tolerance of minorities and out-groups (opposite of xenophobia), peacefulness, little separation of "us" and "them", and less specialization.

==== Authoritarian personality theory ====
Authoritarian personality theory is similar to regality theory, particularly at the regal level. An authoritarian personality would entail an individual having attitudes depicted as belief of absolute obedience/submission to authority. This submission or belief in submission is accomplished via the oppression of those not in power (typical members of the social group) by the centralized authority. It is currently understood in two sections based on two identified worldviews. The worldview that the world is a dangerous place perpetuates the right-wing authoritarian personality type, while the psychological understanding of the world as a dog-eat-dog world will lead to social dominance orientation. The perception of collective danger and the expected response to such danger described by authoritarian personality theory allow for the connection between this theory and regality theory. The difference between the two and the justification for the consideration of regality theory over authoritarian personality theory is that regality theory allows for greater empirical research via statistical analysis of causal relationships as well as regality theory's better avoidance of political bias.

== Applications ==
=== Methods of study ===
Forms of study used to empirically observe regality of a culture are still developing. The most common form seen is to retroactively attempt to find evidence of the regal and kungic designs on studies already completed. Thus, studies particularly designed with instruments to study regal and kungic are somewhat limited. A study was done by taking data of 186 non-industrial societies in the form of a standard cross-cultural sample and ethnographic records that created a sub-sample set. The study utilized various statistical methods and was retroactively performed on data from explorers of the 19th and 20th centuries. Exploratory factor analysis, structural equation modeling, and multiple correlation analysis were all run on this data and found that cultural variables such as political integration, sex morals, trends in autonomy, class stratification, and high gods, are correlated with intergroup conflict in the directions that regality theory would predicts. Studies that are considered related to this are studies that look that also attempt to isolate the relationship of cultural variables to collective dangers. Variations of factorial analyses appear to be most common statistical method that might be applied to regal and kungic society studies.

There is suggestion that archaeological data may also prove regal and kungic societal structures of ancestral populations. Artifacts, by regality theory, reveal in their design whether a researcher is looking at a piece from a kungic society or a regal society. This connection is considered exemplified by the organization of a design. If the design appears uniform and orderly, then is it likely from a regal society in that this condition would have higher value for these styles of detail- this is if one is to believe that identify may be derived form artifact. An artifact of a kungic society might then have design that is more abstract, disorderly, and lacking uniformity.

=== War and intergroup conflict response ===
Intergroup conflict and war are the major evolutionary factors thought to make up the collective dangers a social group might encounter. This makes them two evolutionary factors very relevant to regality theory. War and intergroup conflict response is what the psychological dispositions that select for a regal society are theorized to be meant for. A major objective of studying regal and kungic (kalyptic) responses is that one might be able to isolate universal conditions leading to war and intergroup conflict and the needed conditions for peace-building and peace-keeping. This real-world application connects this regality theory to political psychology.

== Regal/kungic social patterning in non-human species ==
Considering the study of regality theory among real world human communities is relatively new, studies of regal and kungic level societies amongst non-humans remains basically non-existent and potentially more contentious than at the human level. It would involve utilizing a definition of culture that is not human specific. Defining culture remains a contentious topic across the whole of social sciences. The empirical compromise has been studying patterns of social organization across non-human species that doesn't necessarily require definitive use of a culture definition that allows for the inclusion of non-human species. Still, this is based on regal-like and kungic-like behaviors and this does not address the needed psychological flexibility for regality theory and culture as a whole.

Studies of the social structures of non-human primates, some social carnivores, and hymenoptera may show regal and kungic societal patterns. Non-human primates, as human's closest relative, are subject to the most studies to observe "human-unique" characteristics in non-human species as a whole. Chimpanzees and bonobos make the most popular example of non-human species potentially displaying regal and kungic societal patterns, though studies of their social organization were not necessarily targeting evidence of regality theory. Chimpanzees typically exist in smaller temporary co-ed groups of males and females where males have rank of high or low, which impacts mating opportunity. Aggressive behavior is observed amongst chimpanzees with some authoritative characteristics which allows for their consideration as regal society types. Bonobos are observed to have a kungic society based on kungic-like societal expression. Like chimpanzees, they exist in co-ed groups and follow a fission-fusion pattern. In these groups, females are usually associated with rank and aggressive behavior between individuals is rare for this species. Unlike chimpanzees, the infants and young of the group are more so tolerated by the group males. These egalitarian patterns allow for their consideration as a kungic type.

Social carnivores like wolves, lions, meerkats and dolphins have also been subject to lengthy recordings of their social organization. Wolves and lions are considered to follow regal-like societal structures. Meerkats, however, hold an odd placing. They are known to share burrowing space with other burrowing species harmoniously, though meerkat communities also have an alpha-pair that will scent-mark subordinate group members' space to assert dominance/authority. Also, there is killing of young in these communities, often by the subordinate members on the alpha pair's young. This is meant to increase fitness and opportunity of the subordinate young. Their tolerance of out-groups hinders their direct fit into the regal or kungic society theory dynamics.

Dolphins are also of interest in that they are one of the few non-human species that are considered to show signs of culture. This is based on their adults teaching young to make and use tools, which is considered cultural transmission of learned behaviors. They vary in behaviors based on species and environment so deciding if they follow a kungic-like of regal-like societal pattern cannot be universally applied. However, they are all social, form strong social bonds and typically cooperative.

Hymenoptera refers to insects such as bees, wasps, and ants. They are considered to be the species that perfected the police state social system, and thus they are prime examples of the regal societal structure. In these groups, there is authoritarian structure—queens, workers, soldiers—and often aggressive behavior that is lethal to individuals that do not fit into the collective.

== Criticism ==
The shortcomings of regality theory include its relative newness and that the study of the theory seems highly specialized to Agner Fog, though there are kin theories of cultural dimensions and organization. In several theories of cultural design there is some question as to this theory being potentially misused in negative explanations of some cultures/groups of people. The potential marginalization of people groups is compounded by the dichotomous design of the theory. Like the argument of personality as either states or traits, regality theory poses that cultures/societies are a collection of traits and that they create only two levels—regal/warlike or kungic/peaceful. It suggests two general worldviews when there is no evidence found to suggest that all humans only think in these two ways.

== See also ==
- Asabiyyah
- Evolutionary psychology and culture
- Evolutionary ecology
- Evolutionary game theory
- Life history theory
- Cultural selection theory
- Authoritarian personality
- Theory of cultural tightness and looseness
