= Michele J. Gelfand =

American cultural psychologist

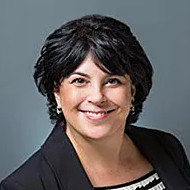

Academic background
- Education: Colgate University; University of Illinois at Urbana–Champaign

Academic work
- Discipline: psychology
- Sub-discipline: cultural psychology
- Institutions: University of Maryland, College Park; Stanford Graduate School of Business
- Website: michelegelfand.com

Michele J. Gelfand is an American cultural psychologist. She is both a professor of organizational behavior and the John H. Scully professor of cross-cultural management at the Stanford Graduate School of Business, and – by courtesy – a professor of psychology at the School of Humanities and Sciences of Stanford University. She has published research on tightness–looseness theory.

== Education and career ==
Gelfand graduated from Colgate University with a B.A. in psychology in 1989. In 1996 she completed a PhD in social psychology and organizational psychology at the University of Illinois, Urbana-Champaign, where she studied under Harry Triandis. She was on the faculty of New York University from 1995 to 1996, and worked at the University of Maryland, College Park from 1996 to 2021. Thereafter, she began her current position at Stanford University.

She is an editor of Advances in Culture and Psychology, which she co-founded; Psychology of Conflict and Conflict Management in Organizations; and The Handbook of Negotiation and Culture. She was the president of the International Association for Conflict Management from 2009 to 2010.

== Research ==
Gelfand has published work on the influences of culture on conflict and resolution and on revenge and forgiveness. She has worked on theoretical frameworks such as individualism–collectivism and tightness–looseness theory; her book on this topic, Rule Makers, Rule Breakers: How Tight and Loose Cultures Wire Our World, was published by Scribner in 2018. A review of the book in the New York Times mentioned that while she is an "engaging writer" and her theory of cultural tightness and looseness is "interesting stuff", Gelfand also "routinely ignores materialist explanations for the various phenomena she considers" In 2026 she had an h-index of 100, according to Google Scholar.

== Awards and honors ==
- Distinguished Early Career Contribution Award, Society for Industrial and Organizational Psychology (2002)
- Cummings Scholarly Achievement Award, Academy of Management Organizational Behavior Division (2002)
- Outstanding Article of the Year Award, International Association for Conflict Management (2009, 2004, and 2001)
- Distinguished University Scholar-Teacher, University of Maryland, College Park (2009)
- Best Paper Award for New Directions, Academy of Management Conflict Management Division (2009)
- Anneliese Maier Research Award, Alexander von Humboldt Foundation (2011)
- Gordon Allport Intergroup Relations Prize, Society for the Psychological Study of Social Issues (2012)
- William A. Owens Scholarly Achievement Award, Society for Industrial and Organizational Psychology (2014)
- Carol and Ed Diener Award in Social Psychology, Society for Personality and Social Psychology (2015)
- Outstanding International Psychologist Award, American Psychological Association (2017)
- Fellow, American Academy of Arts and Sciences (2019)
- Member, U. S. National Academy of Sciences (2021)

== See also ==
- Regality theory, a body of research similar to tightness–looseness theory.
