= The Authoritarian Personality =

1950 sociology book

- Cover of the first edition
- Authors: Theodor W. Adorno, Else Frenkel-Brunswik, Daniel Levinson, Nevitt Sanford
- Published: 1950
- Publisher: Harper & Brothers
- Media type: Print
- ISBN: 978-0-06-030150-7

The Authoritarian Personality is a 1950 sociology book by Theodor W. Adorno, Else Frenkel-Brunswik, Daniel Levinson, and Nevitt Sanford, researchers working at the University of California, Berkeley, during and shortly after World War II.

The Authoritarian Personality "invented a set of criteria by which to define personality traits, ranked these traits and their intensity in any given person on what it called the 'F scale' (F for fascist)." The personality type Adorno et al. identified can be defined by nine traits that were believed to cluster together as the result of childhood experiences. These traits include conventionalism, authoritarian submission, authoritarian aggression, anti-intraception, superstition and stereotypy, power and "toughness", destructiveness and cynicism, projectivity, and exaggerated concerns over sex.

Though criticized at the time for bias and methodology, the book was highly influential in American social sciences, particularly in the first decade after its publication: "No volume published since the war in the field of social psychology has had a greater impact on the direction of the actual empirical work being carried on in the universities today."

== Institutional context ==
Theodor Adorno and a team of researchers – Else Frenkel-Brunswik, Daniel Levinson, and Nevitt Sanford – working at University of California, Berkeley, produced The Authoritarian Personality as part of the "Studies in Prejudice" series sponsored by the American Jewish Committee's Department of Scientific Research. From 1936 to 1945, American social scientists conducted over 400 surveys on antisemitism as part of a larger goal of fortifying democracy in the United States against fascism. In 1943, the Jewish Labor Committee (JLC) initiated a comprehensive study of the prevalence of antisemitism among American workers. Max Horkheimer, from the Institute of Social Research in Frankfurt, and Adorno, conducted the research for these studies. Starting in 1944, the exiled Institute was hired by the JLC to conduct a study led by Leo Löwenthal and others, with assistance from Adorno. Their 1500-page report based on empirical data on "Antisemitism among American Labor", found that American workers held strong antisemitic tendencies and were drawn to fascism. This labor study, which was never published, has been identified by some scholars as the "conduit" between Adorno and Horkheimer's Dialectic of Enlightenment and The Authoritarian Personality.

The research was conducted during and after World War II and the Holocaust — the genocide of European Jews by Adolf Hitler's National Socialist regime — a period when significant concerns about the origins of fascism and authoritarianism had been raised. Adorno had been a member of the "Frankfurt School", a group of philosophers and Marxist theorists who fled Germany when Hitler shut down their Institute for Social Research. Adorno et al. hoped to identify and measure factors that were believed to contribute to antisemitic and fascist traits.

== Sources and influences ==
The Authoritarian Personality was based in part on earlier Frankfurt School analyses undertaken in Germany, but with a few key changes. First, their Marxist and radical roots were downplayed. For example, the earlier "authoritarian personality / revolutionary personality" axis was changed to an "authoritarian personality / democratic personality" axis in America. Thus, values and behaviors earlier associated with revolutionary Marxism were now associated with support for democracy. Second, the book abandoned and/or modified traditional Marxist sociological and economic explanations for human behavior in favor of psychological explanations, earning scorn from more orthodox Marxists.

Generally, Adorno et al. took an antipositivist position; More generally, the Frankfurt School has been critical of reductionism and the third-person perspective in the social sciences. Instead, it recognizes that social science research is inevitably value-laden, which calls for a model of scientist who is a self-reflective interpreter, rather than a technical problem-solver. Furthermore, it assigns a practical purpose in social science. Following a Marxist tradition, it requires that theories in social science should not only describe and explain the social world, but also should serve a human emancipation agenda in all circumstances of oppression and dominance. This is a different approach in philosophy of science than falsification, more popular in the natural sciences.

== Content ==
A central idea of The Authoritarian Personality is that authoritarianism is the result of a Freudian developmental model. Excessively harsh and punitive parenting was posited to cause children to feel immense anger towards their parents; yet fear of parental disapproval or punishment caused people to not directly confront their parents, but rather to identify with and idolize authority figures. Moreover, the book suggested that authoritarianism was rooted in suppressed homosexuality, which was redirected into outward hostility towards the father, which was, in turn, suppressed for fear of being infantilized and castrated by the father. Frenkel-Brunswik's account spread through culture to become a stereotype, though subsequent research produced inconclusive or contradictory results. Authoritarianism was measured by the F-scale. The "F" was short for "pre-fascist personality." Another major hypothesis of the book is that the authoritarian syndrome is predisposed to right-wing ideology and therefore receptive to fascist governments.

== Methodology ==
The study employs both quantitative and qualitative components. The first part of the research resembles a survey type of research with structured questionnaires. Based on the scores on the questionnaires, a smaller number of participants was elected for clinical interviews and administration of the Thematic Apperception Test. Interviews were coded with the techniques of content analysis. (Note: Based on Brown (2004))

=== Sample ===
"The majority of the subjects could be characterized as white, non-Jewish, native-born, middle-class Americans and the authors guessed that their findings would hold for this population"

[Critique point]: The individuals were sampled from formal organizations. There are reasons to believe that there are systematic differences between such a sample and the aforementioned population (see section Overall Criticism).

=== Response format ===
Likert type items ranging from −3 to +3 without a middle point.

=== Psychometric scales ===
- Anti-Semitism Scale
- Ethnocentrism Scale
- Political & Economical Conservatism Scale

==== Anti-Semitism scale ====
This is a listing of the content categories featured in the items. These traits are attributed to Jewish people.

- Offensive (conceited, sensual, dirty)
- Threatening (ruthless, competitive, radical)
- Attitudes (discriminative action to be taken)
- Seclusive (clannish, keeping apart from gentiles)
- Intrusive (desire to intrude where not welcome)

All items were phrased in affirmation of the Anti-Semitic sentiment. Brown (2004, p. 48), together with many others, criticizes this choice as "unwise".

The items were phrased in a superficially moderate language, which nonetheless conveyed the saliency of Jews to the respondent and a negative sentiment towards them

==== Ethnocentrism ====
Split-half reliability for the scale was .91 (high). The correlation between Ethnocentrism and Anti-Semitism scales was .80 (relatively high). This result is "evidence that antagonism to the culturally unlike is a generalized sentiment"

==== Political and economical conservatism ====
Split-half reliability for PEC scale was .73 (moderate). The scale's correlation with A-S and E was not strong, but in none of the groups was it negative. "[...] neither ethnocentrism nor Anti-Semitism ever showed a tendency to go with leftist liberal views."

==== F Scale ====
The F scale targets an authoritarian, anti-democratic personality profile that makes a person susceptible to Fascist propaganda. The items were written in accordance to fascist propaganda materials as well as priory held TAT protocol data and interviews with ethnocentric participants.

- Conventionalism: Adherence to conventional values.
- Authoritarian Submission: Towards ingroup authority figures.
- Authoritarian Aggression: Against people who violate conventional values.
- Anti-Intraception: Opposition to subjectivity and imagination.
- Superstition and Stereotypy: Belief in individual fate; thinking in rigid categories.
- Power and Toughness: Concerned with submission and domination; assertion of strength.
- Destructiveness and Cynicism: hostility against human nature.
- Projectivity: Perception of the world as dangerous; tendency to project unconscious impulses.
- Sex: Overly concerned with modern sexual practices.

Across various participant groups, the average item-total correlation was 0.33. Subsequent factor analysis confirmed a one-dimensional structure of these content subsets of items (Eysenck 1954, p 152, ref by Brown, p. 53). The first form of the F-Scale correlated 0.53 with A-S, 0.65 to E and 0.54 to PEC. The scale was revised by dropping items with low item-total correlations and/or low predictive value of A-S and E scores. The revised form correlated by 0.75 to a combined A-S/E scale, and 0.57 to PEC. Ethnocentrism, anti-Semitism and potentiality for fascism were inter-related to each other, as well as to conservatism, although not as prominently.

==== Correlations with IQ, SES, and education ====
Ethnocentrism is negatively correlated with both IQ and years of education. Subsequent analyses by Christie showed that education is the mediating factor in this set of relationships. Intelligence is not as strongly correlated to E per se if years of education are partialed out, the partial correlation being as small as -.20. Christie also estimated the expected correlation between "either IQ and F scores or years of education and F scores for a representative cross-sectional sample, range between -.50 and -.60".

=== Clinical and projective data ===
==== Interviews ====
The interviewers were instructed to obtain information of the following areas. There were more specific instructions and points of emphasis within each of these areas.

- Vocation
- Income
- Religion
- Clinical Data
  - Family Background: Sociological Aspects
  - Family Figures: Personal Aspects
  - Childhood
  - Sex
  - Social Relationships
  - School
- Politics
- Minorities and Race

[Critique Point] Interviewers (but not coders) were aware of the participants responses and were instructed to study them before interview. This choice was also "severely criticized"

"In considerable degree, [...], the projective data confirm the covariation of implicit antidemocratic trends with prejudice which was demonstrated by the questionnaire data".

==== Construction of personality ====
- Self Glorification vs Objective Self Appraisal
- Conventional Idealization of Parents vs Objective Appraisal
- Family status-concerned vs Family status-relaxed

Additional: Coping with Ambivalence about Self and Others, Lack of acceptance of aggressive feelings towards the parents, Projection of sexual and aggressive impulses to minorities, and its psychological function. "Repression of impulses leads to projection which functions as rationalization for an expression.'

[Critique Point]: Coding and Interpretation is informed by psychoanalytic theory.

==== Cognitive style ====
- Rigidity vs Flexibility
- Intolerance of Ambiguity vs Tolerance of Ambiguity

(see Jaensch's Typology)

[Critique Point] Due to the coders having access to the protocols, the dependency between prejudice and rigidity may be biased.

=== Overall criticism ===
==== Sampling ====
Participants were recruited through formal organizations. Christie reports though that people belonging to at least one organization differ significantly from people that do not belong to organizations at all. Thus the sample taken was not representative of white, non-Jewish, middle-class, Americans. The correlations between A-S, E and F vary in different samples, subsequent studies showed. However, a negative correlation was never found between those scales.

==== Acquiescence Response Set ====
Couch and Keniston (1960) addressed the problem of the items being all phrased in an affirmative direction towards anti-Semitism. In a large number of psychometric instruments, they showed that the tendency to respond affirmatively (Yeasayers) or negatively (Naysayers) is a relevant psychological factor despite the content of specific questionnaires.

It is now accepted that a greater proportion of variance can be attributed to individual response patterns rather than the targeted Anti-Semitic attitude. This poses a validity problem: The scale may not accurately record the variable it is intended to measure.

Bass found a .20 correlation between F-scale and an item-by-item reversed version. (expected correlation if the phrasing played no role would be −1.00) Christie used more elaborate reversal of items accounting for linguistic and psychological subtleties preserving the original rationale of the items preparation. See section on Overall Criticism.

==== Criticisms of content analyses ====
- Interviewer Knowledge of Questionnaire Responses
- Examination of Data in Advance of Coding
- Coding Multiple Variables from the Same Content
- Reporting Inter-rater Reliability for Too General Coding Categories

==== Explanation in terms of socio-economic status (SES) rather than repression ====
"We can easily imagine plausible reasons for the association of each authoritarian trait with the cluster that includes low IQ, little education, and low SES and so the explanation of covariation among the traits is simply their several particular ties to the same underlying factors. [...][However][...] Norms are not put together at random or incidentally. When they stabilize into a particular combination it must be because that is a combination that works for human personalities" (Brown, p. 75)

==== Left wing authoritarianism ====
A number of studies have examined the external criterion validity of F scale, with various demographic and political groups. Such groups included: German cosmetic factory workers (Cohn and Carsch, 1954); English fascists and communists, compared to 'politically neutral' soldiers (Coulter, 1953). Both studies found high scores (>5) in F-Scale.

However, the Coulter study also found the Communists scored higher in F-Scale than the politically neutral group. Eysenck (1954, ref. by Brown, p. 80) commented that Coulter's results indicate that the F-Scale actually measures general authoritarianism, rather than fascist tendencies in particular. (see Left-Wing authoritarianism)

Christie (1956) attributed Coulter's findings to sampling fluctuation, pointing out the politically neutral group was unusually low in F-Scale, compared to 50 known group means at the time. Rokeach (1960) obtained F-Scale scores from 13 Communist college students in England. Their mean was the lowest of all known groups.

Brown, (2004, p. 80) states: "... the Berkeley researchers seem to have been correct in their belief that the F-Scale is a measure of fascism."

== Authors and conflicts ==
Sanford and Levinson were both psychology professors at Berkeley. They did much of the preliminary work on ethnocentrism and statistical measurement. Frenkel-Brunswik examined personality variables and family background with a series of interview studies. Adorno provided a political and sociological perspective to the book. Although Adorno's name heads the alphabetical list of authors, he arrived late to the project and made a relatively small contribution. Adorno, in a 1947 letter to Horkheimer, said that his main contribution was the F-scale, which in the end was the "core of the whole thing." An agreement among the authors held that each one was to sign the individual chapters to which he or she had contributed, and that all four were to sign the chapter on the F-scale; Adorno was credited in 5 of the 23 chapters.

The initially planned title for the book was The Fascist Character and the Measurement of Fascist Trends, but as early as 1947 Adorno feared that the assistants at Berkeley would try to sanitize it to a more innocuous title like Character and Prejudice. The final title was the result of a compromise.

== Responses ==
The Authoritarian Personality inspired extensive research in psychology, sociology, and political science during the 1950s and early 1960s on the relation between personality traits, behavior, and political beliefs. The Authoritarian Personality has often provoked polarized responses: "The Berkeley study of authoritarian personality does not leave many people indifferent".

The study "has been subjected to considerable criticism" since the 1950s, particularly for various methodological flaws, including sample bias and poor psychometric techniques.

In 1973, Gaensslen et al. found that a dogmatism scale containing anxiety items is methodologically questionable.

In 1980, sociologist J.J. Ray argued that the project of The Authoritarian Personality was "obviously false" noting authoritarians on both ends of the political spectrum.^{:40} Ray criticized the study for not asking questions regarding libertarian politics (which according to Ray are typically more anti-authoritarian than right-wing politics);^{:41} for failing to demonstrate that authoritarian/right-wing beliefs are correlated with psychopathology; and, most importantly, for failing to demonstrate that authoritarian beliefs are associated with authoritarian behavior. In 1993, over a decade later, the latter point was also criticized by Billings et al. Milton Rokeach proposed adding an open/closed mindedness dimension of politics.^{:40}

The book concludes that right-wing, authoritarian governments produce hostility towards racial, religious, or ethnic minorities. Psychologist Bob Altemeyer argued against that conclusion, saying that Fascist Italy was not characterized by antisemitism, and that Jews occupied high positions in Mussolini's government until pressure from Hitler disenfranchised these Jews.

Rubenstein's research in Israel revealed that Orthodox Jews scored higher on right wing politics and authoritarianism as traits than Reform Jews, and that both groups scored higher than Secular Jews. However, it cannot be said that there is no relationship between traits of Right-Wing Authoritarians and antisemitism. In fact, Adorno's nine traits of the "F scale" are rather general and have been thought to identify fascist as well as anti-Semitic individual attributes. The fact that Rubenstein himself affirms that "the results confirm the validity of the RWA" represents a particularly interesting outcome: Orthodox and Reform Jews in Israel are classified closer to the fascist and anti-Semitic traits, as thought in 1950 by Adorno et al., compared to Secular Jews in Israel.

Some observers have criticized what they saw as a strongly politicized agenda to The Authoritarian Personality. Conservative social critic Christopher Lasch argued that by equating mental health with left-wing politics and associating right-wing politics with an invented "authoritarian" pathology, the book's goal was to eliminate antisemitism by "subjecting the American people to what amounted to collective psychotherapy—by treating them as inmates of an insane asylum". The Authoritarian Personality remains widely cited in the social sciences and continues to inspire research interest today.

Hyman and Sheatsley 1954

"Our major criticisms lead us inevitably to conclude that the authors' theory has not been proved by the data they cite".

Brown 2004

"The most serious defects in the questionnaire work are the inadequate sampling methods and the operation of response sets. [In spite of that] there is a substantial residual probability that the chief conclusion of the questionnaire work is correct: attitudes of Anti-Semitism, ethnocentrism, and authoritarianism do generally go together. [...] some of the findings of the questionnaire study were replicated in the projectives study, and while this latter work has its own deficiencies, some account must be taken for the convergence in the two sets of data."

"Perhaps the least well supported of all the findings in the Berkeley study are those concerning the genesis of authoritarianism in childhood. [...] However, Frenkel-Brunswik has directly studied prejudice in childhood and adolescence. She reports confirmation of most of the original findings."

Christie and Cook 1958

Christie and Cook (1958) cite 230 titles relating to The Authoritarian Personality and they conclude that:

"...the overall picture shows consistency of findings in many of the most intensively studied areas. The E and F scales are found to be significantly correlated in a wide array of samples and predictions of relationships with attitudinal measures are almost invariably confirmed"

== See also ==
- Ambiguity tolerance
- Authoritarian personality
- Authoritarian socialism
- The Mass Psychology of Fascism
- Narcissistic personality disorder
- Right-wing authoritarianism
- Psychohistory
