= F-scale (personality test) =

Personality test that measures susceptibility to authoritarian systems

The California F-scale is a 1947 personality test designed by Theodor W. Adorno and others to measure the "authoritarian personality". The F stands for fascist. The F-scale measures responses on several different components of authoritarianism, such as conventionalism, authoritarian aggression, superstition and stereotypy, power and "toughness", destructiveness and cynicism, projectivity, and sex. Scores acquired from the F-scale could be directly associated with background components, educational level, and intellectual capacity. It is an indirect type of test that ensures the result would not be due to the individual's fake responses; this is possible because the purpose of the measurement and which attitude is being measured are initially concealed from the participants. The existence of this correlation could possibly affect the way in which the F-scale accurately measures the authoritarian personality syndrome. The F-scale has two principal purposes: it aims to measure prejudice and anti-democratic tendencies at the personality level.

== Personality dimensions ==
The scale specifically examines the following personality dimensions:

- Conventionalism: conformity to the traditional societal norms and values of the middle class
- Authoritarian submission: a passive notion towards adhering to conventional norms and values
- Authoritarian aggression: punishing and condemning individuals who do not adhere to conventional values
- Religion and Ethics
- Superstition and Stereotypy
- Power and "Toughness"
- Anti-intraception: "rejection of all inwardness, of the subjective, the imaginative, the tender-minded, and of self-criticism"
- Destructiveness and Cynicism: generalized hostility, vilification of the human
- Projectivity: the disposition to believe that wild and dangerous things go on in the world; the projection outwards of unconscious emotional impulses
- Sex: exaggerated concern with sexual "goings-on"

F-scale tests measure not only the subject's overall level of stress but also their willingness to cooperate in the testing process.

== Early research ==
Research in the late 1960s focused on police and the detection of authoritarianism.

== Doubt about its indirect measure ==
According to data presented by Baljeet Ahmed Muhammad, a hypothesis was formed proposing that brighter people are capable of penetrating the significance of the F-scale, helping them react in a more "suitable" fashion. Hence, because the F-scale can be faked, it cannot be considered as an indirect measure. In the course of the Minnesota Adoption Study it was found that "the F-scale scores were negatively correlated with WAIS vocabulary [an IQ test] (−0.42) and showed the same pattern of family correlations".

== Criticism ==
The scale has attracted a great deal of criticism, since it is ideological and associates societal processes with personality characteristics.

Among the criticisms of the F-scale is its sensitivity to respondents with acquiescent response styles due to being worded so that agreement always indicated an authoritarian response. A number of related scales such as the Wilson–Patterson Conservatism Scale and the Balanced F-scale have been created in an attempt to fix the shortcomings of the F-scale. Bob Altemeyer's right-wing authoritarianism scale is the most frequently used, contemporary descendant of the F-scale.

Another criticism of the test is the assumption that users with a high score are unsophisticated and may lack social intelligence. According to Kelman and Barclay (1963), the experience of the participant is reflected on the test score; i.e., they may not be able to see the obvious pattern and motives recurring in the test and be ignorant of it.

== See also ==
- The Authoritarian Personality
- Authoritarian socialism
- California Psychological Inventory
- Right wing authoritarianism (RWA)
