= Marc Hetherington =

American political scientist (born 1968)

Marc J. Hetherington
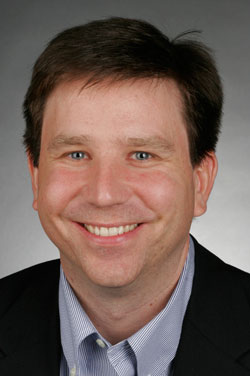
- Hetherington
- Born: June 20, 1968 (age 58)
- Education: University of Pittsburgh (B.A.); University of Texas at Austin (Ph.D.)
- Known for: Why Trust Matters, Parties, Politics, and Public Policy in America, Authoritarianism and Polarization in American Politics, Why Washington Won't Work
- Scientific career
- Fields: Political science, health care in the United States, participatory democracy
- Workplaces: Vanderbilt University; Bowdoin College; Princeton University; University of Virginia; University of North Carolina at Chapel Hill

Marc Joseph Hetherington (born June 20, 1968) is an American political scientist. He is a professor of political science at The University of North Carolina at Chapel Hill.

== Biography ==
Hetherington has taught at the University of Virginia, Princeton University, Bowdoin College, and Vanderbilt University. He received a bachelor degree from University of Pittsburgh and a PhD in Government from the University of Texas at Austin.

Hetherington is author of Why Trust Matters: Declining Political Trust and the Demise of American Liberalism and Parties, Politics, and Public Policy in America with William Keefe, and of Authoritarianism and Polarization in American Politics with Jonathan Weiler.

Hetherington is married to Suzanne Globetti, a political scientist at The University of North Carolina at Chapel Hill and currently resides in Chapel Hill.
