= Else Frenkel-Brunswik =

Austrian psychologist (1908–1958)

- Born: Else Frenkel; August 18, 1908; Lemberg, Austrian Galicia, Austria-Hungary
- Died: March 31, 1958 (aged 49); Berkeley, California, U.S.
- Education: University of Vienna
- Occupation: Psychologist
- Spouse: Egon Brunswik

Else Frenkel-Brunswik (Austrian German: [ˈfrɛŋkəl ˈbrʊnsvɪk]; August 18, 1908 – March 31, 1958) was a Polish-born Austrian psychologist. She was forced to leave Poland and later Austria as a result of anti-Jewish persecution. She is best known for her contributions to The Authoritarian Personality (1950), her collaboration with Theodor W. Adorno, Daniel Levinson, and Nevitt Sanford. It is considered a milestone work in personality theory and social psychology.

== Early life in Europe ==
Else Frenkel was born August 18, 1908, in Lemberg, in Austria-Hungary, the second of three daughters of Jewish department store owner Abraham Frenkel and his wife Helene Frenkel. In 1914, her family moved from Galicia to Vienna to escape the pogroms.

They went to Vienna, where Else completed her Doctorate dissertation under supervision of Karl Bühler at the University of Vienna in 1930. Her thesis topic was Das Associationsprinzip in der Psychologie. She held an associate professorship at the Psychological Institute from 1931 to 1938, working as a research assistant to Charlotte Bühler. She went through psychoanalysis with Ernst Kris.

In 1938, after the Anschluss, she had to leave Austria.

== Life in America ==
Like many of her peers of Jewish origin escaping Nazi persecution, Else made her way to the USA, where she became a citizen in 1938. In the same year she married Egon Brunswik, Bühler's former student who had joined the faculty of Berkeley in 1937.

From 1939 to 1958 Else Frenkel-Brunswik worked as a research associate at the Institute of Child Welfare, Department of Psychology of the University of California at Berkeley. Else Frenkel initially worked in the area of personality studies. Mechanisms of Self-Deception (1939) explained the tenets of psychoanalysis to an American audience.

As part of the Berkeley Public Opinion Study (University of California), she studied antisemitism, working with Theodor W. Adorno, social psychologist R. Nevitt Sanford and the psychiatrist and psychologist Daniel J. Levinson, who had been one of her students. The work was supported by the American Jewish Committee. Their research identified anti-Semitism as the outcome of a more general ethnocentrism characterized by an authoritarian personality structure that was intolerant of ambiguity. Such individuals were unable to genuinely experience the self and others, instead seeking power and success and relying on rigid stereotypes to ensure order and safety.

In 1950, as product of her collaboration with Theodor W. Adorno, Daniel Levinson, and Nevitt Sanford, The Authoritarian Personality appeared. It is a milestone work in social psychology. Her experience in psychoanalysis and personality studies were crucial to the research project.

In 1950, she went to the University of Oslo as a visiting lecturer and research consultant. In 1954–1955 she held a fellowship at the Center for Advanced Study in the Behavioral Sciences at Stanford University.

In 1955, her husband Egon committed suicide after a long illness. This deeply impacted Else' professional and personal life. Although she was unanimously elected to a full professorship in the psychology department at Berkeley, after her husband no longer was employed there, the recognition brought her little comfort. She suffered from severe depression and committed suicide 31 March 1958 by overdose of barbital.

Her biography is included into prestigious Notable American Women collection.

== Writings ==
- Else Frenkel, Edith Weisskopf: Desire and Duty in the Structure of Human Life. Gerold & Co., Vienna 1937 (Psychological research on the CV. Edited by Charlotte Bühler and Else Frenkel. Volume 1).
- Else Frenkel-Brunswik: Motivation and Behavior. Genetic Psychology Monographs. Vol. 26, 1942, pp 121–265.
- Theodor W. Adorno, Else Frenkel-Brunswik, Daniel J. Levinson, R. Nevitt Sanford: The Authoritarian Personality . New Harper and Brothers, New York the 1950s.
- Else Frenkel-Brunswik: Selected Papers. Edited by Nanette Heiman and Joan Grant. International Universities Press, New York 1974th
- Else Frenkel-Brunswik: Studies the Authoritarian Personality. Selected Writings (edited and introduced by Dietmar Paier). Library of social science emigrants. Vol. 3. Nausner and Nausner, Wien 1996. ISBN 3-901402-04-7
- Else Frenkel-Brunswik, R. Nevitt Sanford: "The anti-Semitic personality. A research report". In: Erich Simmel (ed.): Anti-Semitism. Fischer, Frankfurt a.M., 1993, S, 119–147. (An earlier version of the Journal of Psychology, Vol. 20, 1945, pp 271–291). ISBN 3-596-10965-5
- Nathan W. Ackerman, Theodor W. Adorno, Bruno Bettelheim, Else Frenkel-Brunswik, Marie Jahoda, Morris Janowitz, Daniel J. Levinson, R. Nevitt Sanford: The Authoritarian Character. Volume 2: Studies on Authority and Prejudice. Amsterdam: De Munter, Amsterdam 1969. ISBN 3-88535-341-5
- Dietmar Paier: "Else Frenkel-Brunswik 1908–1958". Archive for the History of Sociology in Austria. Newsletter (Graz), no. 13, June 1996 pp 9–11. (see[1] )
