= Nevitt Sanford =

Professor of psychology at the University of California at Berkeley

Nevitt Sanford (31 May 1909 – 11 July 1995) was an American professor of psychology at the University of California at Berkeley and later at Stanford University. A Harvard doctoral student of Gordon Allport, PhD in social psychology and Henry Murray, MD at the Harvard Clinic, as a young Cal professor Sanford studied ethnocentrism and antisemitism, and was the senior author along with Columbia University philosopher Theodor Adorno of The Authoritarian Personality, also known as "the Berkeley Study."

Sanford's other co-authors in this classical social psychological study were UC Berkeley Psychology Clinic supervisor and Rorschach expert Else Frenkel-Brunswik and Sanford's doctoral student Daniel Levinson, later a Yale psychology professor. In the study, Sanford and his colleagues queried the interactions between social systems and personality, concluding that social conditions encouraged those with dogmatic biases to persecute those groups against which they were prejudiced. Sanford was a psychoanalyst, but in his social psychological research was more empirical in his approach, and decades after the publication of The Authoriitarian Personality had to ask his doctoral student and later UC Berkeley professor Edward J. Hyman to explain Theodor Adorno's critical theoretical contributions to the theoretical tracts of the Berkeley Study.

The study had been sponsored by the wartime Office of Strategic Services, whose Dr. Herbert H. Hyman, a social psychologist, had commissioned it, as well as a psychological study of Hitler by Sanford's Harvard clinical psychology professor, Dr. Henry A. Murray, and also a study of wartime US soldiers by Sanford's Harvard colleague and friend Brewster Smith, later both a Harvard and UC Berkeley professor, and then provost of the University of California, Santa Cruz and president of the American Psychological Association.

== Life ==
Sanford was born in Chatham, Virginia, son and grandson of Baptist ministers. Nevitt earned his baccalaureate degree at the University of Richmond. All of his brothers, including his older brother who later became president of the American Psychological Association, also attended and played football at Richmond. Even today, Nevitt Sanford still holds the University of Richmond record for the longest run, having received the kickoff at the end line and having run the ball all the way to the end zone.

Nevitt followed his years at Richmond with a master's degree in psychology at Columbia University, and then his Ph.D. in psychology from Harvard University, where he studied both social and clinical psychology, working with the respective luminaries of those fields, Gordon Allport, PhD, one of the founding fathers of social psychology, and with Henry A. Murray, MD, the pioneer of the Harvard Clinic and founder of the field of clinical psychology at Harvard. Nevitt joined the staff at Harvard Psychological Clinic in 1935. In 1940, the young PhD became professor of psychology at the University of California at Berkeley. In 1950, Berkeley dismissed Nevitt and 11 other professors, including the luminary behaviorist Edward Tolman, after whom the University of California ultimately named its psychology and education building, because of their refusal to sign the California loyalty oath instituted in the McCarthy Era, but still on the books in California.

After departing Berkeley, Sanford briefly became a research affiliate at the Tavistock Institute for Human Relations in London, after which he returned to the United States to teach at Vassar College.

In 1959, as a result of a finding of the California Supreme Court, Sanford was reinstated at Berkeley with back pay. Once reinstated, he immediately quit. In 1961, he moved to become a professor at Stanford.

In the 1950s and early 60s, he played a lead role in a major longitudinal study of American higher education which produced (publications included The American College (1962) and Where Colleges Fail (1967)). In these studies, Sanford argued that there was an overemphasis on academic publishing, a phenomenon often referred to as the "publish or perish" syndrome, and that this compulsion to publication was inducing a serious deterioration in the quality of instruction in American higher education.

In 1968, Professor Stanford founded the Wright Institute, a free-standing psychology graduate school in Berkeley, California, and later also in Los Angeles. The Wright Institute continues today to offer a doctorate in Social Clinical Psychology and a master's in Counseling Psychology.

Aside from being a strong proponent of rigorous teaching skills in higher education, Sanford was also a writer, (co)authoring approximately 200 academic journal articles and approximately 12 books.

After retiring, Sanford tried to return to the South, but found the contrast between his life there and his former life in California stressful, and he returned to live again in Berkeley, California, where he died, in 1995, at the age of 86. Nevitt had several adult children and myriad grandchildren, as well as hundreds of students and friends, who attended his memorial service and succeeded him in life. The legacy of R. Nevitt Sanford, PhD lives on with his many graduate students and research colleagues in the struggle against fascism and authoritarianism.
