= Shere (disambiguation) =

Shere is a village in Surrey, England.

Shere may also refer to:

== People ==
- Charles Shere (1935–2020), American composer
- Dennis Shere, American author, journalist and lawyer
- Shere Hite (1942–2020), American-born German sex educator and feminist
- Shere Lekgothoane (born 1979), South African footballer

== Places ==
- Shere, British Columbia, a former station on the Canadian National Railway
- Shere, Plateau State, a village in Nigeria
- Shere, Pretoria, a residential area in South Africa

== Other uses ==
- Shere (Dune), a fictional substance
- Shere Hills, a range of rock formations on the Jos Plateau, Nigeria
- Shere Khan, a fictional tiger in Rudyard Kipling's Jungle Book
- Shere SMART, a railway ticket issuing system
- Shere Thursday or Maundy Thursday, a day in Holy Week

== See also ==
- Shear (disambiguation)
- Sheer (disambiguation)
- Sher (disambiguation)
