= Silent Coup =

Early 1990s book about Nixon Watergate scandal

Silent Coup: The Removal of a President
- Author: Len Colodny, Robert Gettlin
- Language: English
- Subject: Watergate scandal
- Publisher: St. Martin's Press
- Publication date: January 1992
- Publication place: United States
- Media type: Print (Hardcover)
- Pages: 580 pages
- ISBN: 0-312-05156-5 (hardback) ISBN 978-0-312-92763-9 (paper)
- OCLC: 22493143
- Dewey Decimal: 364.1/32/0973 20
- LC Class: E860 .C635 1991

Silent Coup is a book written by Len Colodny and Robert Gettlin that proposed an alternate explanation for the Watergate scandal that led to the 1974 resignation of US President Richard Nixon. The first edition was published in 1991, followed by an expanded second edition in January 1992.

== Summary ==
The prevailing narrative is that Nixon and his high-ranking associates covered up a 1972 break-in at the Democratic National Committee (DNC) headquarters in the Watergate Complex which had been undertaken to obtain information to be used against Nixon's political rivals.

In contrast, Colodny and Gettlin contend that former White House counsel John Dean orchestrated the 1972 Watergate burglary. Dean’s motive was argued to have been to protect his future wife Maureen Biner by removing information linking her to a call-girl ring that worked for the DNC. The authors also lay out a case that Nixon's Chief of Staff Alexander Haig colluded with national security personnel in an attempt to sabotage Nixon's presidency, the coup of the title. Colodny and Gettlin also argue Haig was "Deep Throat", the nickname for an important and then-unidentified source for reporter Bob Woodward, who broke the Watergate story with Carl Bernstein at The Washington Post. Woodward was a Naval officer before becoming a reporter, had briefed Haig at the White House in 1969 and 1970 in that capacity, and the authors suggest that Haig was a source for the reporters. Colodny and Gettlin are also sharply critical of Woodward and Bernstein, accusing them of violating journalistic conventions in pursuit of their story and of distorting known facts.

In 2005 it was revealed that FBI deputy director Mark Felt was the "Deep Throat" informant who had become Woodward's key source.

== Reception ==
In a review for the Los Angeles Times, Robert Scheer said the book's claims might seem "preposterous" but were carefully documented and could not be easily dismissed. Apart from a flurry of media interest at the initial publication, Scheer said the book was largely ignored by mainstream American news outlets who he believed had uncritically accepted Woodward and Bernstein’s narrative.

Scheer also noted Silent Coup was not flattering to Nixon or intended as a defense of his administration given how he is depicted as venal, hapless and unethical.

== Lawsuits ==
In 1992 John and Maureen Dean sued Nixon "plumber" G. Gordon Liddy for libel, after Liddy publicly supported the core claims in Silent Coup. Liddy's testimony was the first time he spoke publicly in detail about the Watergate break-in, as he had refused to cooperate with investigators during the Watergate scandal. The libel case was dismissed without prejudice and was later refiled. In 2001 a federal judge declared a mistrial after the jury was deadlocked, and dismissed the $5.1 million defamation lawsuit.

The Deans also sued St. Martin's Press, publisher of Silent Coup. St. Martin's settled the case for an undisclosed sum. Len Colodny also settled with John Dean, and explained that “Dean agreed to accept a settlement and sign an agreement not to sue the author again on the same grounds because he wanted to avoid a public courtroom drama.” Although, “Colodny said he wanted the court to hear the case because he was confident that a public trial would validate his reporting.” For his part, Dean has gone on record in the preface to his 2006 book, Conservatives Without Conscience, that he is "pleased" with the outcome.

In 2001, former DNC secretary Ida Wells sued Liddy in the U. S. Federal District Court in Baltimore on bases similar to those used by Dean. The court declared a mistrial, with judge J. Frederick Motz stating no "reasonable jury" could find in Wells’ favor.
