= Scheer =

Scheer is a surname. Notable people with the surname include:

- Al Scheer (1888–1959), American baseball player
- Alexander Scheer (born 1976), German actor and musician
- Andrew Scheer (born 1979), Canadian politician
- August-Wilhelm Scheer (born 1941), German professor of business administration
- Brad Scheer (born 1998), Australian football player
- Carl Scheer (1936–2019), American basketball executive
- Chloe Scheer (born 1999), Australian football player
- Christopher Scheer (born 1968), American journalist
- Dolph van der Scheer (1909–1966), Dutch speed skater
- Edna Scheer (1926–2000), American baseball player
- Elke Scheer (born 1965), German physicist
- Eva Scheer (1915–1999), Norwegian journalist, literary critic, translator and author
- Gene Scheer (born 1958), American songwriter, librettist and lyricist
- Heinie Scheer (1900–1976), American baseball player
- Hermann Scheer (1944–2010), German politician and renewable energy advocate
- Jens Scheer (1935–1994), German physicist
- Jim Scheer (born 1953), American politician
- Julian Scheer (1926–2001), American merchant mariner, journalist, public relations professional, and author
- K. H. Scheer (1928–1991), Germany science fiction writer
- Klaus Scheer (born 1950), German football player and manager
- Marc Alexander Scheer (born 1979), German sprinter
- Mary Scheer (born 1963), American actress
- Monique Scheer (born 1967), American anthropologist
- Nina Scheer (born 1971), German lawyer and politician
- Paul Scheer (born 1976), American comedian
- Pitty Scheer (1925–1997), Luxembourgian cyclist
- Regina Scheer (born 1950), German writer and historian
- Reinhard Scheer (1863–1928), German admiral
- Richard Scheer (born 1974), Franco-Seychellois weightlifter
- Robert Scheer (born 1936), American journalist
- Roger P. Scheer (born 1934), American air force general
- Sandro Scheer (born 1978), German politician
- Sherie Scheer (born 1940), American photographer
- Tamara Scheer (born 1979), Austrian historian

== Other uses ==
- IDS Scheer, software company founded by August-Wilhelm Scheer
- Scheer (band), Irish alternative rock band
- Scheer, Germany, town in Baden-Württemberg
- German cruiser Admiral Scheer
