= Shear =

Shear may refer to:

== Textile production ==
- Animal shearing, the collection of wool from various species
  - Sheep shearing
- The removal of nap during wool cloth production
- Scissors, a hand-operated cutting equipment

== Science and technology ==
=== Engineering ===
- Shear strength (soil), the shear strength of soil under loading
- Shear line (locksmithing), where the inner cylinder ends and the outer cylinder begins in a cylinder lock
- Shearing (manufacturing), a metalworking process which cuts stock without the formation of chips or the use of burning or melting
- Shear (sheet metal), various tools to shear sheet metal
- Board shear, in bookbinding, a tool to cut board or paper
- Shear pin, in machinery, such as a plough, designed to shear (break) when a certain force is exceeded, to protect other components of the machine.
- Shearing interferometer, in optics, a simple and very common means to check the collimation of beams by observing interference
- Shearing in computer graphics, more commonly called screen tearing
- Shear wall, a wall composed of braced panels to counter the effects of lateral load acting on a structure
- Shear forming, different from conventional metal spinning in that a reduction of the wall thickness is induced

=== Mathematics/astronomy ===
- Cosmic shear, an effect of distortion of image of distant galaxies due to deflection of light by matter, as predicted by general relativity (see also gravitational lens)
- Shear mapping, a particular type of mapping in linear algebra, also called transvection
- Shear matrix in geometry, a linear transformation shearing a space
- One of the optical scalars of a collection of light rays in general relativity

=== Solid materials ===
- Shear (geology), a form of fault in rocks
- Shear stress in physics, refers to a stress state that will cause shearing when it exceeds a material's shear strength
- Shearing (physics), the deformation of a material substance in which parallel internal surfaces slide past one another
- Shear strength

=== Wind/fluids ===
- Simple shear, a special case of deformation of a fluid
- Shear (fluid), in fluid dynamics, refers to the shear stresses and responses thereto in fluids
- Shear rate, a gradient of velocity in a flowing material
- Shear line (meteorology), an area of wind shear
- Wind shear, a difference in wind speed or direction between two wind currents in the atmosphere

== Surnames ==
- Shear (surname)
- Shearing (surname)

== Other ==
- Shear (character), a Marvel Comics superhero

== See also ==
- Shears (disambiguation)
- Shearer (disambiguation)
- Sheer (disambiguation)
- Sher (disambiguation)
- Shere, Surrey, England
- Scissors (disambiguation)
