= John Dean =

American attorney (born 1938)

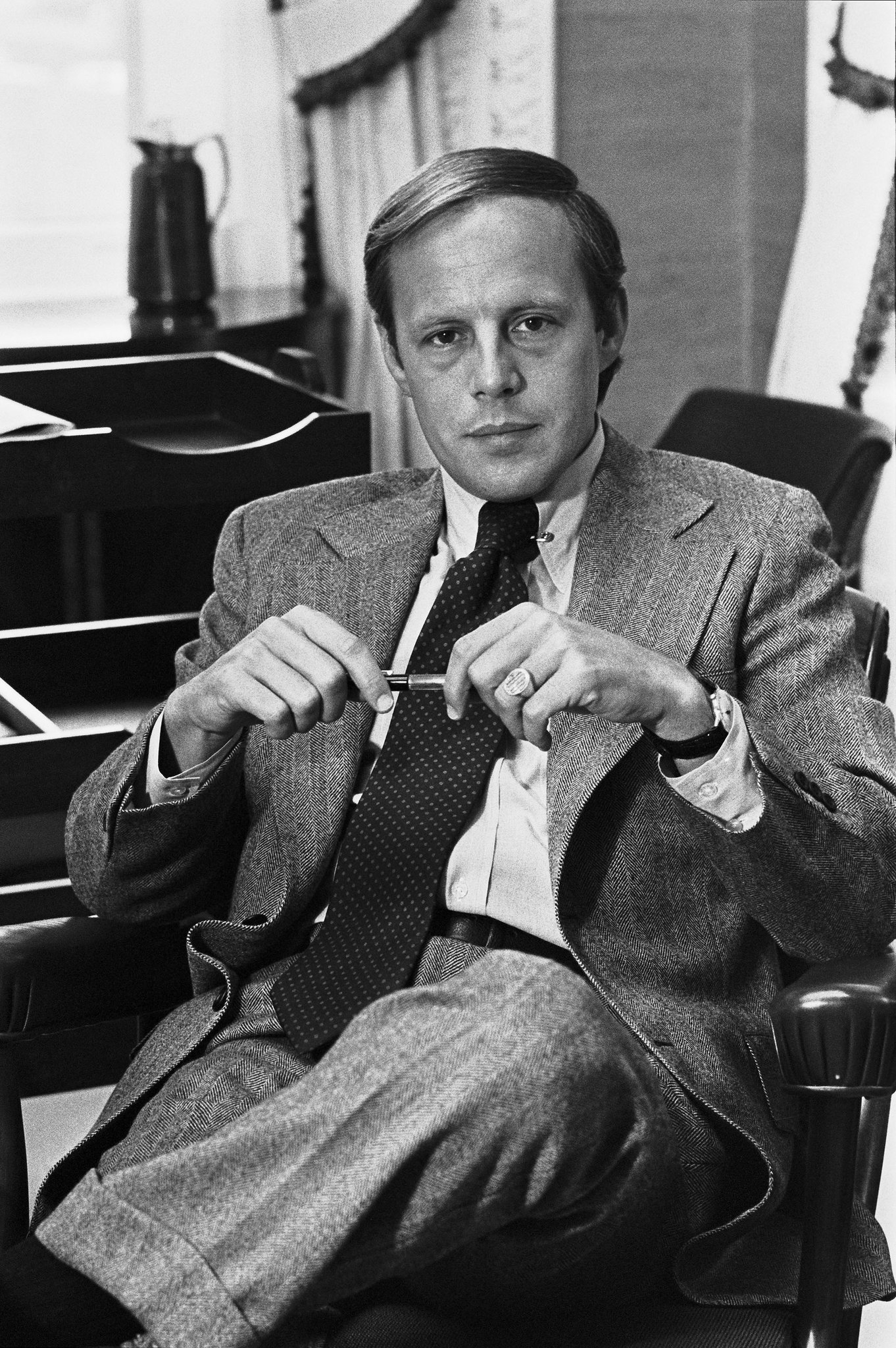
- Dean at the White House in 1973

White House Counsel
- In office July 9, 1970 – April 30, 1973
- President: Richard Nixon
- Preceded by: Chuck Colson
- Succeeded by: Leonard Garment

Personal details
- Born: John Wesley Dean III; October 14, 1938 (age 88) Akron, Ohio, U.S.
- Party: Republican (formerly); Independent
- Spouses: Karla Henning (m. 1962; div. 1970); Mo Kane (m. 1972)
- Children: 1
- Education: Colgate University (attended); College of Wooster (BA); Georgetown University (JD)

John Wesley Dean III (born October 14, 1938) is a disbarred American attorney who served as White House Counsel for U.S. President Richard Nixon from July 1970 until April 1973. Dean is known for his role in the cover-up of the Watergate scandal and his subsequent testimony to Congress as a witness. His guilty plea to a single felony in exchange for becoming a key witness for the prosecution ultimately resulted in a reduced sentence, which he served at Fort Holabird in Southeast Baltimore, Maryland. After his plea, he was disbarred.

Shortly after the Watergate hearings, Dean wrote about his experiences in a series of books and toured the United States to lecture. He later became a commentator on contemporary politics, a book author, and a columnist for FindLaw's Writ.

Dean had originally been a proponent of Goldwater-style conservatism, but he later became a critic of the Republican Party. Dean has been particularly critical of the party's support of Presidents George W. Bush and Donald Trump, and of neoconservatism, strong executive power, mass surveillance, and the Iraq War.

== Early life and education ==
Dean was born in Akron, Ohio, and lived in Marion, the hometown of the 29th President of the United States, Warren Harding, whose biographer he later became. His family moved to Flossmoor, Illinois, where he attended grade school. For high school, he attended Staunton Military Academy with Barry Goldwater Jr., the son of Sen. Barry Goldwater, and became a close friend of the family. He attended Colgate University and then transferred to the College of Wooster in Ohio, where he obtained his B.A. in 1961. He received a Juris Doctor (J.D.) from the Georgetown University Law Center in 1965.

Dean married Karla Ann Hennings, the daughter of Senator Thomas C. Hennings Jr. of Missouri, on February 4, 1962; they had one child, John Wesley Dean IV, before divorcing in 1970. Dean married Maureen (Mo) Kane on October 13, 1972.

== Washington lawyer ==
After graduation, Dean joined Welch & Morgan, a law firm in Washington, D.C., where he was soon accused of conflict of interest violations and fired: he was alleged to have started negotiating his own private deal for a TV station broadcast license, after his firm had assigned him to complete the same task for a client.

Dean was employed from 1966 to 1967 as chief minority counsel to the Republicans on the United States House Committee on the Judiciary. Dean then served as associate director of the National Commission on Reform of Federal Criminal Laws for approximately two years.

== Nixon campaign and administration ==
External videos
- 1973 Watergate Hearings; 1973-06-25; Part 1 of 6, 1:07:59, Library of Congress, American Archive of Public Broadcasting (WGBH and the Library of Congress), Boston, MA and Washington, DC

Dean volunteered to write position papers on crime for Richard Nixon's presidential campaign in 1968. The following year, he became an associate deputy in the office of the Attorney General of the United States, serving under Attorney General John N. Mitchell, with whom he was on friendly terms. In July 1970, he accepted an appointment to serve as counsel to the president, after the previous holder of this post, Chuck Colson, became the president's director of the Office of Public Liaison.

== Watergate scandal ==
=== Start of Watergate ===
On January 27, 1972, Dean, the White House Counsel, met with Jeb Magruder (deputy director of the Committee to Re-Elect the President, or CRP and CREEP) and Mitchell (Attorney General of the United States, and soon-to-be Director of CRP), in Mitchell's office, for a presentation by G. Gordon Liddy (counsel for CRP and a former FBI agent). Liddy presented a preliminary plan for intelligence-gathering operations during the campaign. Reaction to Liddy's plan was highly unfavorable. Liddy was ordered to scale down his ideas, and he presented a revised plan to the same group on February 4, which was also left unapproved.

In late March in Florida, Mitchell approved a scaled-down plan. This revised plan eventually led to attempts to eavesdrop on the Democratic National Committee (DNC) headquarters at the Watergate complex in Washington, D.C., and to the Watergate scandal. The burglars' first break-in attempt in late May was successful, but several problems had arisen with poor-quality information from their bugs, and they wanted to photograph more documents. Specifically, the burglars were interested in information they thought was held by DNC head Lawrence F. O'Brien. On their second break-in, on the night of June 16, hotel security discovered the burglars. After the burglars' arrest, Dean took custody of evidence and money from the White House safe of E. Howard Hunt, who had been in charge of the burglaries, and destroyed some of the evidence before investigators could find it.

=== Link to cover-up ===
On February 28, 1973, Acting FBI Director L. Patrick Gray testified before the Senate Judiciary Committee during his nomination to replace J. Edgar Hoover as director of the FBI. Armed with newspaper articles indicating the White House had possession of FBI Watergate files, committee chair Sam Ervin asked Gray what he knew about the White House obtaining the files. Gray said he had given FBI reports to Dean, and had discussed the FBI investigation with Dean on many occasions. It also came out that Gray had destroyed important evidence Dean entrusted to him. Gray's nomination failed and Dean was directly linked to the Watergate cover-up.

White House Chief of Staff H. R. Haldeman later claimed that Nixon appointed Dean to take the lead role in coordinating the Watergate cover-up from an early stage and that this cover-up was working very well for many months. Certain aspects of the scandal came to light before Election Day, but Nixon was reelected by a landslide.

=== Cooperation with prosecutors ===
On March 22, 1973, Nixon requested that Dean put together a report with everything he knew about the Watergate matter, inviting him to take a retreat to Camp David to do so. Dean went to Camp David and did some work on a report, but since he was one of the cover-up's chief participants, the task put him in the difficult position of relating his own involvement as well as that of others; he correctly concluded that higher-ups were fitting him for the role of scapegoat. Dean did not complete the report.

On March 23, the five Watergate burglars, along with G. Gordon Liddy and E. Howard Hunt, were sentenced with stiff fines and prison time of up to 40 years.

On April 6, Dean hired an attorney and began cooperating with Senate Watergate investigators, while continuing to work as Nixon's Chief White House Counsel and participating in cover-up efforts, not disclosing this obvious conflict to Nixon until some time later. Dean was also receiving advice from the attorney he hired, Charles Shaffer, on matters involving the vulnerabilities of other White House staff.

Dean continued to provide information to the prosecutors, who were able to make enormous progress on the cover-up, which until then they had virtually ignored, concentrating on the actual burglary and events preceding it. Dean also appeared before the Watergate grand jury, where he took the Fifth Amendment numerous times to avoid incriminating himself, and in order to save his testimony for the Senate Watergate hearings.

=== Firing by Nixon ===
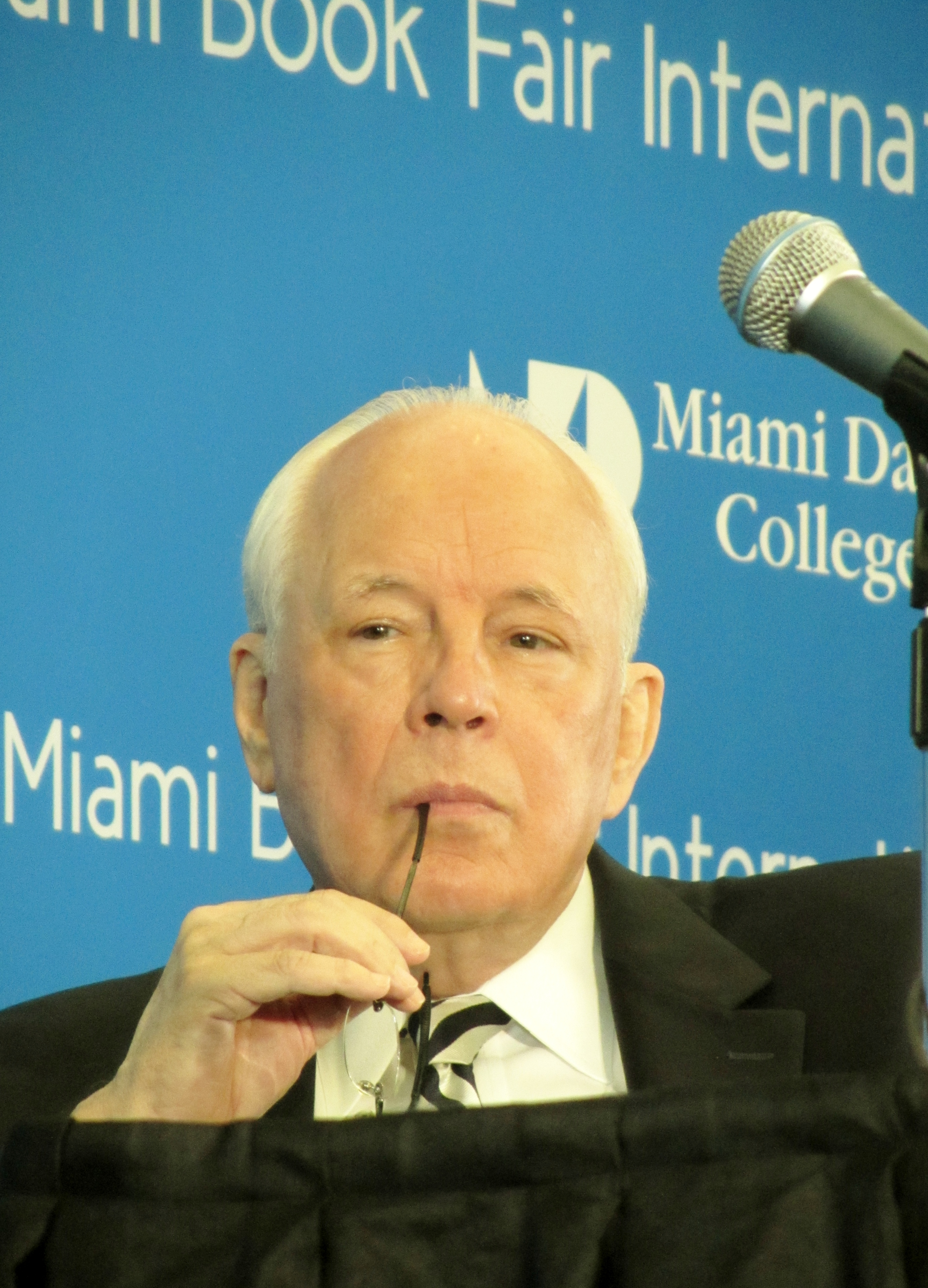
Dean at the Miami Book Fair 2014 during the presentation of his book The Nixon Defense

Coupled with his sense of distance from Nixon's inner circle, the "Berlin Wall" of advisors Haldeman and Ehrlichman, Dean sensed he was going to become the Watergate scapegoat and returned to Washington without completing his report. Nixon fired Dean on April 30, 1973, the same day he announced the resignations of Haldeman and Ehrlichman and US Attorney General Richard Kleindienst.

When Nixon learned that Dean had begun cooperating with federal prosecutors, he pressed Kleindienst not to give Dean immunity from prosecution, telling him that Dean was lying to the Justice Department about his conversations with the president. On April 17, 1973, Nixon told Assistant Attorney General Henry Petersen (who was overseeing the Watergate investigation) that he did not want any member of the White House to be granted immunity from prosecution. Petersen informed Nixon that this could cause problems for the prosecution of the case, but Nixon publicly announced his position that evening.

=== Testimony to Senate Watergate Committee ===
On June 25, 1973, Dean began his testimony before the Senate Watergate Committee. The committee had voted to grant him use immunity (doing so in a divided vote in a private session that was then changed to a unanimous vote and announced that way to the public). In his testimony, he implicated administration officials, including Mitchell, Nixon, and himself. His testimony attracted very high television ratings since he was breaking new ground in the investigation, and media attention grew apace, with more detailed newspaper coverage. Dean was the first administration official to accuse Nixon of direct involvement with Watergate and the resulting cover-up in press interviews.

==== Research on accuracy of Dean's memory ====
When it was revealed that Nixon had secretly recorded all meetings in the Oval Office, psychologist and memory researcher Ulric Neisser analyzed Dean's recollections of the meetings, as expressed through his testimony, in comparison to the meetings' actual recordings. A sharp critic of studying memory in a laboratory setting, Neisser saw "a valuable data trove" in Dean's recall.

Neisser found that, despite Dean's confidence, the tapes proved that his memory was anything but a tape recorder. Dean failed to recall any conversations verbatim, and often failed to recall the gist of conversations correctly. Neisser did not explain the difference as one of deception; rather, he thought that the evidence supported the theory that memory is not akin to a tape recorder and instead should be thought of as reconstructions of information that are greatly affected by rehearsal, or attempts at replay.

=== Criminal trial ===
Dean pleaded guilty to obstruction of justice before Watergate trial judge John Sirica on October 19, 1973. He admitted supervising payments of "hush money" to the Watergate burglars, notably E. Howard Hunt, and revealed the existence of Nixon's enemies list. Watergate special prosecutor Archibald Cox was interested in meeting with Dean and planned to do so a few days later, but Cox was fired by Nixon the next day; it was not until a month later that Cox was replaced by Leon Jaworski. On August 2, 1974, Sirica handed down a sentence to Dean of one to four years in a minimum-security prison. But when Dean surrendered as scheduled on September 3, he was diverted to the custody of U.S. Marshals and kept instead at Fort Holabird (near Baltimore, Maryland) in a special "safe house" primarily used for witnesses against the Mafia. He spent his days at the offices of Jaworski, the Watergate Special Prosecutor, and testifying in the trial of Watergate conspirators Mitchell, Haldeman, Ehrlichman, Robert Mardian, and Kenneth Parkinson, which concluded in December. All except Parkinson were convicted, largely based upon Dean's evidence. Dean's lawyer moved to have his sentence reduced and on January 8, Sirica granted the motion, adjusting Dean's sentence to time served, which was four months. With his plea to felony offenses, Dean was disbarred as a lawyer in Virginia and the District of Columbia.

== Life after Watergate ==
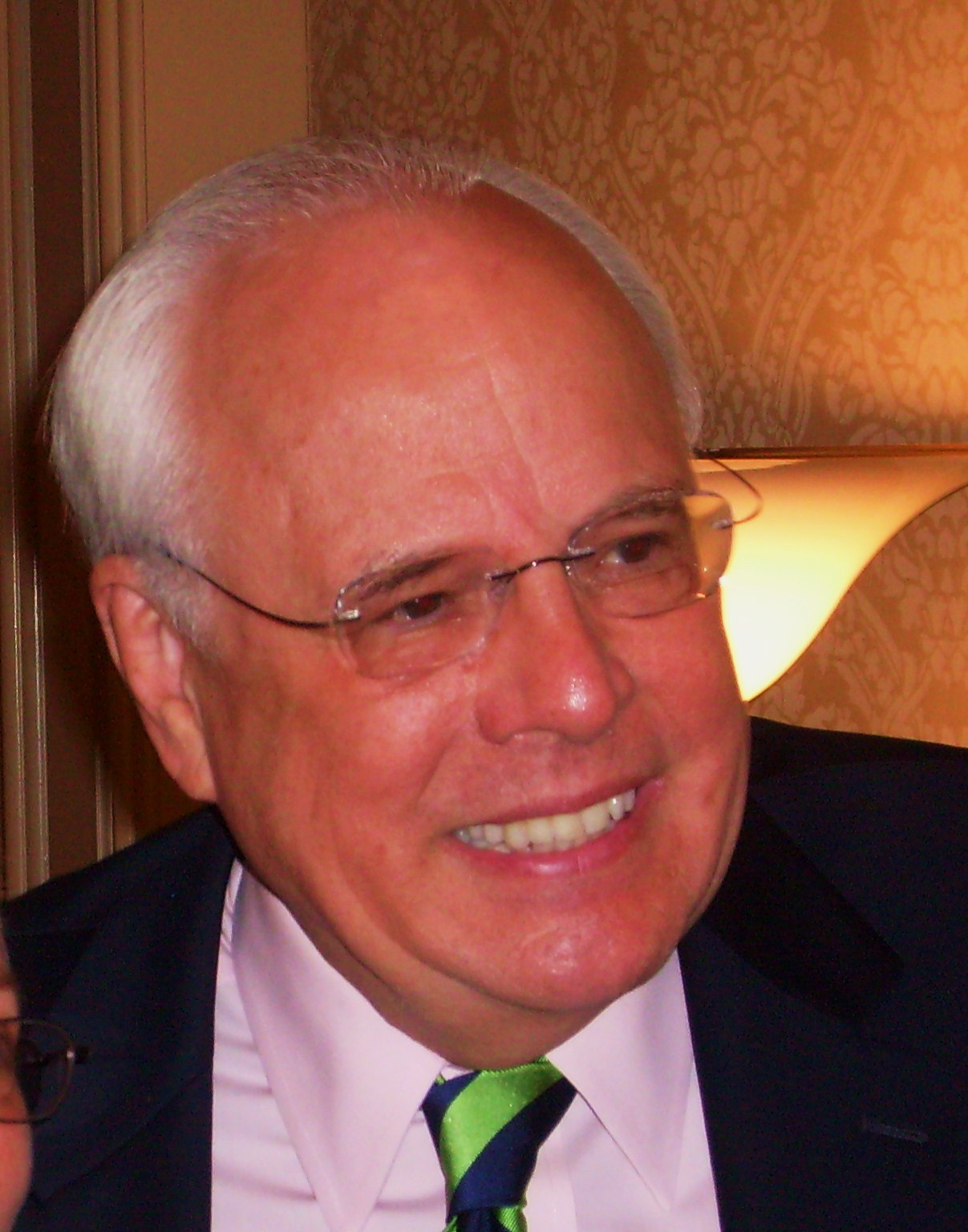
John Dean in 2008 at the annual conference of the Society of American Archivists.

=== Investment banker ===
Shortly after Watergate, Dean became an investment banker, author and lecturer based in Beverly Hills, California. He chronicled his White House experiences, with a focus on Watergate, in the memoirs Blind Ambition (1976) and Lost Honor (1982). Blind Ambition was ghostwritten by future Pulitzer Prize-winning journalist Taylor Branch and later made into a 1979 TV miniseries.

In 1992, Dean hired attorney Neil Papiano and brought the first in a series of defamation suits against G. Gordon Liddy for claims in Liddy's book Will and St. Martin's Press for its publication of the book Silent Coup by Len Colodny and Robert Gettlin. Silent Coup alleged that Dean masterminded the Watergate burglaries and the Watergate coverup and that the true aim of the burglaries was to seize information implicating Dean and the former Maureen "Mo" Biner (his then-fiancée) in a prostitution ring. After hearing of Colodny's work, Liddy issued a revised paperback version of Will supporting Colodny's theory. This theory was subsequently the subject of the 1992 A&E Network Investigative Reports series program The Key to Watergate.

In the preface to his 2006 book Conservatives Without Conscience, Dean strongly denied Colodny's theory, pointing out that Colodny's chief source (Phillip Mackin Bailley) had been in and out of mental institutions. Dean settled the defamation suit against Colodny and his publisher, St. Martin's Press, on terms that Dean wrote in the book's preface he could not divulge under the conditions of the settlement, other than that "the Deans were satisfied." The case of Dean vs. Liddy was dismissed without prejudice. Also in 2006, Dean appeared as an interviewee in the documentary The U.S. vs. John Lennon, about the Nixon administration's efforts to keep John Lennon out of the United States.

Dean retired from investment banking in 2000 while continuing to work as an author and lecturer, becoming a columnist for FindLaw's Writ online magazine.

=== Watergate comments ===
In 2001, Dean published The Rehnquist Choice: The Untold Story of the Nixon Appointment that Redefined the Supreme Court, an exposé of the White House's selection process for a new Supreme Court justice in 1971, which led to the appointment of William Rehnquist. He resides in Beverly Hills, California.

In 2008, Dean co-edited Pure Goldwater, a collection of writings by the 1964 Republican presidential nominee and former U.S. Senator Barry Goldwater, in part as an act of fealty to the man who defined his political ideals. His co-editor was Goldwater's son Barry Goldwater Jr.

Historian Stanley Kutler was accused of editing his transcripts of the Nixon tapes to make Dean appear in a more favorable light.

On September 17, 2009, Dean appeared on Countdown with new allegations about Watergate. He said he had found information via the Nixon tapes that showed what the burglars were after: information on a kickback scheme involving the Democratic National Convention in Miami Beach, Florida. Dean also asserts that Nixon did not directly order the break-in, but that Ehrlichman ordered it on Nixon's behalf.

In speaking engagements in 2014, Dean called Watergate a "lawyers' scandal" that, for all the bad, ushered in needed legal ethics reforms.

=== Criticism of George W. Bush ===
In 2004, Dean wrote a book heavily critical of the administration of George W. Bush, Worse than Watergate, in which he called for the impeachment of Bush and Vice President Dick Cheney for allegedly lying to Congress.

His next book, released in 2006, was Conservatives without Conscience, a play on Barry Goldwater's book The Conscience of a Conservative. In it, he asserts that post-Goldwater conservatism has been co-opted by people with authoritarian personalities and policies, citing data from Bob Altemeyer. According to Dean, modern conservatism, specifically on the Christian Right, embraces obedience, inequality, intolerance, and strong intrusive government, in stark contrast to Goldwater's philosophies and policies. Using Altemeyer's scholarly work, he contends that there is a tendency toward ethically questionable political practices when authoritarians are in power and that the current political situation is dangerously unsound because of it. Dean cites the behavior of key members of the Republican leadership, including George W. Bush, Dick Cheney, Tom DeLay, Newt Gingrich and Bill Frist, as clear evidence of a relationship between modern right-wing conservatism and this authoritarian approach to governance. He places particular emphasis on the abdication of checks and balances by the Republican Congress and on the dishonesty of the conservative intellectual class in support of the Republican Party, as a result of the obedience and arrogance innate to the authoritarian mentality.

After it became known that Bush authorized NSA wiretaps without warrants, Dean asserted that Bush is "the first President to admit to an impeachable offense". On March 31, 2006, Dean testified before the Senate Judiciary Committee during hearings on censuring Bush over the issue. Senator Russell Feingold, who sponsored the censure resolution, introduced Dean as a "patriot" who put "rule of law above the interests of the president." In his testimony, Dean asserted that Nixon covered up Watergate because he believed it was in the interest of national security. This sparked a sharp debate with Republican South Carolina senator Lindsey Graham, who repeatedly asserted that Nixon authorized the break-in at Democratic headquarters. Dean finally replied, "You're showing you don't know that subject very well." Spectators laughed, and soon the senator was "sputtering mad".

Dean's 2007 book Broken Government: How Republican Rule Destroyed the Legislative, Executive and Judicial Branches is, as he wrote in its introduction, the third volume of an unplanned trilogy. In this latest book, Dean, who has repeatedly called himself a "Goldwater conservative", built on Worse Than Watergate and Conservatives Without Conscience to argue that the Republican Party has gravely damaged all three branches of the federal government in the service of ideological rigidity and with no attention to the public interest or the general good. Dean concludes that conservatism must regenerate itself to remain true to its core ideals of limited government and the rule of law.

=== Criticism of Donald Trump ===
Dean later emerged as a strong critic of Donald Trump, saying in 2017 that he was even worse than Nixon. He said, "It's a nightmare. They don't know what their jeopardy is. They don't know what they're looking at. They don't know if they're a part of a conspiracy that might unfold. They don't know whether to hire lawyers or not, how they're going to pay for them if they do. It's an unpleasant place."

In February 2018, Dean warned that Rick Gates's testimony may be "the end" of Trump's presidency.

In September 2018, Dean warned against Brett Kavanaugh's confirmation to the United States Supreme Court, a main concern being that the appointment would result in "the most presidential-powers-friendly court" in modern times.

On November 7, 2018, the day after the midterm elections, Trump forced Attorney General Jeff Sessions to resign. Dean commented on the removal in colorful terms, saying it "seems to be planned like a murder" and that Special Counsel Robert Mueller likely had contingency plans, possibly including sealed indictments.

In early June 2019, Dean testified, along with various U.S. attorneys and legal experts, before the House Judiciary Committee on the implications of, and potential actions as a result of, the Mueller report.

In 2022, Dean said the January 6 Committee had an overwhelming case against Trump. In 2024, Dean said the Trump v. United States ruling essentially affirms Nixon's famous statement during the Nixon interviews: "When the president does it, that means that it is not illegal." Dean said Nixon "would have survived" the Watergate scandal under the ruling "because the evidence against him was based on official acts the Supreme Court has deemed immune from prosecution." Dean called the ruling "a radical decision by a radical court" and "judicial activism on steroids." Dean elaborated his thoughts on the ruling:

"Well, there's actually two rulings in this decision. There's a 6-3 for presumptive immunity, but there's also a 5-4 on you can't even have the evidence of official conduct come to play... This is very...this to me, appears to certainly influence the existing law on presidential conduct [and] what's available...evidentiary speaking. Amy Coney Barrett said she didn't think that it should be so restricted as the decision of the court itself was, so I think that Nixon would have survived. I think he would have walked under this ruling."

Dean had even noted Nixon might have survived that same scandal if Fox News had existed during that time (1970s). He said:

"I think there's more likelihood [Nixon] might have survived if there'd been a Fox News."

== Media appearances and portrayals ==
Dean frequently served as a guest on the former MSNBC and Current TV news program, Countdown with Keith Olbermann, and The Randi Rhodes Show on Premiere Radio Networks.

In the 1979 TV mini-series Blind Ambition, Dean was played by Martin Sheen. In the 1995 film Nixon, directed by Oliver Stone, Dean was played by David Hyde Pierce. In the 1999 film Dick, Dean was played by Jim Breuer. In the 2022 TV mini-series Gaslit, Dean was played by Dan Stevens. In the 2023 TV mini-series White House Plumbers, Dean was played by Domhnall Gleeson.

== Bibliography ==
External videos
- Presentation by Dean on The Rehnquist Choice, October 10, 2001, C-SPAN
- Booknotes interview with Dean on Warren G. Harding, March 14, 2004, C-SPAN
- Presentation by Dean on Conservatives Without Conscience, July 13, 2006, C-SPAN
- Presentation by Dean on Conservatives Without Conscience, September 5, 2006, C-SPAN
- Presentation by Dean on Broken Government, October 28, 2007, C-SPAN
- Presentation by Dean and Barry Goldwater, Jr. on Pure Goldwater, April 17, 2008, C-SPAN
- After Words interview with Dean on The Nixon Defense, August 8, 2014, C-SPAN
- Interview with Dean on The Nixon Defense, November 22, 2014, C-SPAN
- Presentation by Dean on Authoritarian Nightmare, October 15, 2020, C-SPAN

- Dean, John W. (1976). Blind Ambition: The White House Years. New York: Simon and Schuster. ISBN 0-671-22438-7.
- Dean, John W. (1982). Lost Honor: The Rest of the Story. Los Angeles: Stratford Press. ISBN 0-936906-15-4.
- Dean, John W. (2001). The Rehnquist Choice: The Untold Story of the Nixon Appointment that Redefined the Supreme Court. New York: Free Press. ISBN 0-7432-2607-0.
- Dean, John W. (2002). Unmasking Deep Throat. [S.l.]: Salon Media. ISBN 0-9721874-1-3.
- Dean, John W. (2004). Warren G. Harding (The American Presidents). New York: Times Books. ISBN 0-8050-6956-9.
- Dean, John W. (2004). Worse than Watergate: The Secret Presidency of George W. Bush. New York: Little, Brown. ISBN 0-316-00023-X.
- Dean, John W. (2006). Conservatives without Conscience. New York: Viking Adult. ISBN 0-670-03774-5.
- Dean, John W. (2007). Broken Government: How Republican Rule Destroyed the Legislative, Executive and Judicial Branches. New York: Viking Adult. ISBN 978-0-670-01820-8.
- Dean, John W.; Barry M. Goldwater, Jr. (2008). Pure Goldwater. New York: Palgrave Macmillan. ISBN 978-1-4039-7741-0.
- Dean, John W. (2009). Blind Ambition: The Updated Edition: The End of the Story. New York: Polimedia. ISBN 978-0-9768617-5-1.
- Dean, John W. (2014). The Nixon Defense: What He Knew and When He Knew It. New York: Viking. ISBN 978-0-670-02536-7.
- Dean, John W. (2020). Authoritarian Nightmare: Trump and His Followers. New York: Melville House. ISBN 978-1-6121990-5-4.

Legal offices
Preceded by Chuck Colson	White House Counsel; 1970–1973	Succeeded by Leonard Garment
