= Authoritarian leadership =

Authoritarian leadership may refer to:

- Authoritarianism, form of government with absolute control
  - Authoritarian leadership style, type of authoritarian leadership
