= Vikram Amar =

American legal scholar (born 1963)

Vikram D. Amar
- Born: February 15, 1963 (age 63)
- Education: University of California, Berkeley (BA); Yale University (JD)
- Relatives: Akhil Reed Amar (brother)

Vikram David Amar (born February 15, 1963) is an American legal scholar focusing on constitutional law, federal courts, and civil and criminal procedure. In August 2015, he became dean of the University of Illinois College of Law and the Iwan Foundation Professor of Law. He returned to the University of California, Davis School of Law as a Distinguished Professor of Law in 2023.

== Biography ==
Amar received a B.A. in history from the University of California, Berkeley. In 1988, he earned his J.D. from Yale Law School, where he served as an articles editor for the Yale Law Journal.

Prior to his arrival at Illinois Law, Amar was professor and senior associate dean for academic affairs at the UC Davis School of Law (King Hall). Before becoming a professor, he clerked for Judge William Albert Norris of the U.S. Court of Appeals for the Ninth Circuit and for Justice Harry Blackmun at the U.S. Supreme Court. After serving as a clerk, Amar worked in the Sacramento office of Gibson, Dunn & Crutcher, then began his career in legal academia in 1993 at UC Davis School of Law (King Hall). He joined the UC Hastings faculty in 1998, before returning to King Hall in 2007.

He writes a biweekly column for justia.com. Previously, he wrote a regular column for FindLaw's Writ. He also frequently appears on national radio and television programs as a commentator on contemporary legal issues.

Amar is the younger brother of Yale University law professor Akhil Reed Amar. Vikram Amar was a student at Yale Law School at the time Akhil Amar started teaching there. The two have collaborated on influential articles on many important topics, including the "Amar Plan" proposal for a National Popular Vote Interstate Compact, and the implausibility of independent state legislature theory. They submitted an amicus curiae brief to the Supreme Court of the United States concerning the disqualification of the presidential candidacy of Donald Trump by the Colorado Supreme Court, under Section 3 of the Fourteenth Amendment to the United States Constitution. His work has been cited in a number of Supreme Court cases including Brown v. Plata, in which Justice Anthony Kennedy for the majority relied on a volume of a treatise he edited, and Sosa v. Alvarez-Machain, which cited an amicus brief he authored.

== See also ==
- List of law clerks for the second seat of the Supreme Court of the United States
