= Writ (website) =

Legal commentary website

- Available in: English
- Current status: Online

Writ is a legal commentary website on the topic of the law of the United States hosted by FindLaw. The website is no longer adding content, having published its last entry in August 2011. Before then, Writ published at least one new column by one of its regular columnists every business day, and frequently posted a second column by a guest columnist. The regular columnists were all notable attorneys. Almost all contributors are law professors; some are former law clerks from the U.S. Supreme Court; some are past or present federal prosecutors; one is a former Counsel to the President; one is a novelist, and one is the current director of the Terrorism and Counterterrorism Program of Human Rights Watch. The guest columnists also tend to be law professors or seasoned attorneys. When the website was still producing new content, columnists commented both on notable ongoing court cases and recent court decisions, as well as on current events.

Writ also published occasional book reviews, on books of both legal and more general interest; the book reviewers were likewise academically inclined attorneys.

Writ is free, and maintains all of its material from its inception in a free archive.

Although Writ is known mainly among legal circles, its columnists tend to be prolific authors who reach a broad audience. Many have published books as well as frequent articles and op-eds in newspapers and magazines such as The New York Times, The Washington Post, The Atlantic Monthly, U.S. News & World Report, The Los Angeles Times, The Chicago Tribune, and Slate. One Writ columnist, Marci Hamilton, was the first guest on The Daily Show in its new studio in 2005; columnist Edward Lazarus also appeared on The Daily Show in 2006.

Writ is available online and, after an extended period of inactivity, actively publishes new articles as of 2022.

== Writ's regular columnists ==
- Akhil Amar
- Vikram Amar
- Bart Aronson
- Sherry Colb
- John Dean
- Michael C. Dorf
- Joanna Grossman
- Marci Hamilton
- Julie Hilden
- Edward Lazarus
- Joanne Mariner
- Anita Ramasastry
- Anthony Sebok

== Books by Writ columnists ==
- Akhil Reed Amar. America's Constitution: A Biography. ISBN 1-4000-6262-4
- Akhil Reed Amar. The Bill of Rights: Creation and Reconstruction
- Sherry Colb. When Sex Counts: Making Babies and Making Law. ISBN 0-7425-5150-4
- John Dean. Conservatives Without Conscience. ISBN 0-670-03774-5
- John Dean. Worse Than Watergate: The Secret Presidency of George W. Bush. ISBN 0-316-00023-X
- John Dean. Warren G. Harding. ISBN 0-8050-6956-9
- John Dean. The Rehnquist Choice: The Untold Story of the Nixon Appointment That Redefined the Supreme Court. ISBN 0-7432-2607-0
- John Dean. Blind Ambition. ISBN 0-671-81248-3
- Michael C. Dorf. Constitutional Law Stories. ISBN 1-58778-505-6
- Michael C. Dorf. On Reading the Constitution. ISBN 0-674-63626-0
- Marci Hamilton. God vs. the Gavel : Religion and the Rule of Law. ISBN 0-521-85304-4
- Julie Hilden. Three. ISBN 0-452-28443-0
- Julie Hilden. The Bad Daughter : Betrayal and Confession. ISBN 1-56512-185-6
- Edward Lazarus. Closed Chambers : The Rise, Fall, and Future of the Modern Supreme Court. ISBN 0-14-028356-0
- Edward Lazarus. Black Hills, White Justice: The Sioux Nation Versus the United States, 1775 to the Present. ISBN 0-8032-7987-6
- Joanne Mariner. No Escape: Male Rape in U.S. Prisons.
- Anthony Sebok et al. Legal Positivism in American Jurisprudence. ISBN 0-521-48041-8
