= Blind Ambition (miniseries) =

1979 American TV miniseries

- Based on: Blind Ambition
- Written by: John Dean; Maureen Dean; Taylor Branch
- Screenplay by: Stanley R. Greenberg
- Directed by: George Schaefer
- Starring: Martin Sheen; William Daniels; Ed Flanders
- Theme music composer: Walter Scharf
- Country of origin: United States
- Original language: English
- No. of episodes: 4

Production
- Producer: Renee Valente
- Cinematography: Edward R. Brown
- Editors: Arthur Hilton; Peter Parasheles; John Wright
- Running time: 480 minutes
- Production company: Talent Associates

Original release
- Network: CBS
- Release: May 20 – May 23, 1979

Blind Ambition is a four-part American miniseries that aired on CBS from May 20, 1979 to May 23, 1979 focusing on the 1972–74 Watergate scandal and based on the memoirs of former White House counsel John Dean and his wife Maureen.

Producer Renee Valente earned an Emmy nomination for the series.

Part I ranked as the 15th most-watched show for the week of May 14–20, 1979, and Parts IV, II, and III, respectively, ranked as the 11th-13th most watched primetime shows of the following week.

== Cast ==
- Martin Sheen as John Dean, Nixon White House counsel and coordinator of the Watergate cover-up turned star witness
- Rip Torn as President Richard Nixon
- Theresa Russell as Maureen Dean
- William Daniels as G. Gordon Liddy, former FBI agent, one of the head White House Plumbers and one of the Watergate Seven
- Graham Jarvis as John Ehrlichman, Nixon chief domestic advisor
- John Randolph as John Mitchell, former Attorney General
- Lawrence Pressman as H.R. "Bob" Haldeman, Nixon White House Chief of Staff
- Ed Flanders as Charlie Shaffer, Dean's lawyer
- Peter Mark Richman as Robert Mardian, political CRP coordinator
- James Sloyan as Ronald Ziegler, Nixon White House press secretary
- William Windom as Richard Kleindienst, Attorney General succeeding Mitchell
- Lonny Chapman as L. Patrick Gray, acting FBI director
- Christopher Guest as Jeb Stuart Magruder, CRP coordinator turned witness
- James Karen as Earl Silbert, federal prosecutor
- Kip Niven as Egil "Bud" Krogh, Nixon executive assistant who worked with the White House Plumbers
- Michael Callan as Charles Colson, Nixon White House counsel preceding Dean
- David Sheiner as Samuel Dash, Georgetown law professor and chief counsel to the Senate Watergate Committee
