= Worse than Watergate =

Worse than Watergate: The Secret Presidency of George W. Bush
- Cover of the first edition
- Author: John W. Dean
- Language: English
- Subject: Presidency of George W. Bush
- Publisher: Little, Brown and Company
- Publication date: 2004
- Publication place: United States
- Media type: Print
- Pages: 272
- ISBN: 0-316-00023-X

Worse than Watergate: The Secret Presidency of George W. Bush is a 2004 book by author and Watergate figure John W. Dean. In the book, Dean criticizes the administration of President George W. Bush for lacking transparency in decision making and compares it with the administration of President Richard Nixon, for whom he served as legal counsel. He also draws attention to potentially serious issues that, as of 2004, had been given a low profile in the US media. In particular, he notes that the 18 March 2003 presidential determination, a condition of the legislation which authorized the 2003 invasion of Iraq, failed to satisfy the terms imposed by Congress and consequently would justify impeachment.

== Critical reception ==
For The New York Times, Franklin Foer commented: "Although Dean doesn't have any insider knowledge, he paints a convincingly grim picture of the [Bush] administration's culture of secrecy." However, Foer found the organization of chapters to lack flow and believed the book to lack depth, for instance: "Comparisons between the Bush and Nixon White Houses appear in a tantalizing first chapter but are never teased out."

Dennis Drabelle recommended Worse than Watergate in the Washington Post Book World: "Dean, who once diagnosed a cancer eating away at Richard Nixon's presidency, now discerns an even graver sickness in the current incumbency..." Robert Scheer praised the book as "depressingly accurate" in a Los Angeles Times column.

Joseph Bottum of The Weekly Standard named Worse than Watergate among the worse books of 2004, comparing it to "a Bull Moose attack on the tariff policies of William Howard Taft".

== Publication information ==
- Worse than Watergate: The Secret Presidency of George W. Bush (2004). Little, Brown & Company. ISBN 0-316-00023-X

== See also ==
- Executive Order 13233
- The Prosecution of George W. Bush for Murder
