= Bob Altemeyer =

Canadian psychologist (1940–2024)

- Born: 6 June 1940
- Died: 7 February 2024 (aged 83)
- Awards: AAAS Prize for Behavioral Science Research

Academic background
- Education: Carnegie Mellon University

Academic work
- Discipline: Psychology
- Institutions: University of Manitoba
- Main interests: Research into authoritarianism

Robert Anthony Altemeyer (6 June 1940 – 7 February 2024) was a Canadian psychologist who was the professor of psychology at the University of Manitoba. Altemeyer developed the right-wing authoritarianism (RWA) scale and the related left-wing authoritarianism (LWA) scale.

Altemeyer defined right-wing authoritarianism in 1981 as a refinement of the authoritarian personality theory pioneered by University of California, Berkeley researchers Theodor W. Adorno, Else Frenkel-Brunswik, Daniel Levinson, and Nevitt Sanford. According to Altemeyer, a right-wing authoritarian is someone who:

- is naturally submissive to authority figures that they consider to be legitimate,
- acts aggressively in the name of said authority figures, and/or
- is very conventional (i.e. conformist) in thought and behavior.

Altemeyer performed extensive research on authoritarianism, identifying the psychological makeup of authoritarian followers and authoritarian leaders. His studies concentrated on who the followers are, how they got that way, how they think, and why they tend to be submissive and aggressive. He also collected data on authoritarianism among North American politicians.

Altemeyer reported his research in several books, most recently for general audiences in The Authoritarians, written at the suggestion of John W. Dean. Altemeyer's work is referenced in Dean's 2006 book, Conservatives Without Conscience. Altemeyer's last book, Authoritarian Nightmare, co-written by Dean, is a book about U.S. president Donald Trump and his authoritarian followers.

== Personal life and death ==
His son, Rob Altemeyer, was an NDP MLA in the Manitoba Legislature from 2003 to 2019.

Altemeyer died on 7 February 2024, at the age of 83.

== Awards ==
Altemeyer was awarded the American Association for the Advancement of Science Prize for Behavioral Science Research in 1986.

== Books ==
- Altemeyer, Bob (1981). Right-Wing Authoritarianism. Winnipeg: University of Manitoba Press. ISBN 0-88755-124-6.
- Altemeyer, Bob (1988). Enemies of Freedom: Understanding Right-Wing Authoritarianism. Mississauga: Jossey-Bass. ISBN 978-1555420970.
- Altemeyer, Bob (1996). The Authoritarian Specter. Cambridge: Harvard University Press. ISBN 0-674-05305-2.
- Altemeyer, Bob; Hunsberger, Bruce (1997). Amazing Conversions: Why Some Turn to Faith and Others Abandon Religion. Amherst: Prometheus Books. ISBN 978-1573921473.
- Hunsberger, Bruce; Altemeyer, Bob (2006). Atheists: A Groundbreaking Study of America's Nonbelievers. Amherst: Prometheus Books. ISBN 978-1591024132.
- Altemeyer, Bob (2006). The Authoritarians. Winnipeg: University of Manitoba. OCLC 191061772. Archived from the original on 2016-10-04. and several subsequent postscripts: Comment on the 2008 election, Comment on the Tea Party movement and a short comment on Donald Trump.
- Altemeyer, Bob (2009). Sex and Youth: A Twenty-Four Year Investigation. Winnipeg: University of Manitoba. OCLC 516955225.
- Dean, John; Altemeyer, Bob (2020). Authoritarian Nightmare: Trump and His Followers. Brooklyn: Melville House. ISBN 978-1612199054.
