= Sherring =

Sherring is a surname. Notable people with the surname include:

- Billy Sherring (1877–1964), Canadian marathon runner
- Frank Sherring (1914–2007), Canadian auto dealer and politician
- M. A. Sherring (1826–1880), English Protestant missionary in British India and Indologist

== See also ==
- Shearing (surname)
