= Paper cutter =

Tool involving paper

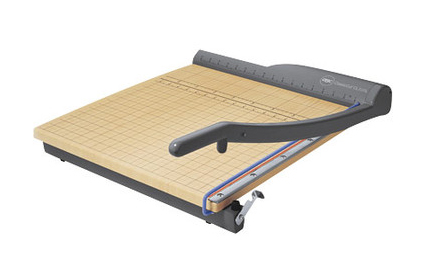
A paper cutter

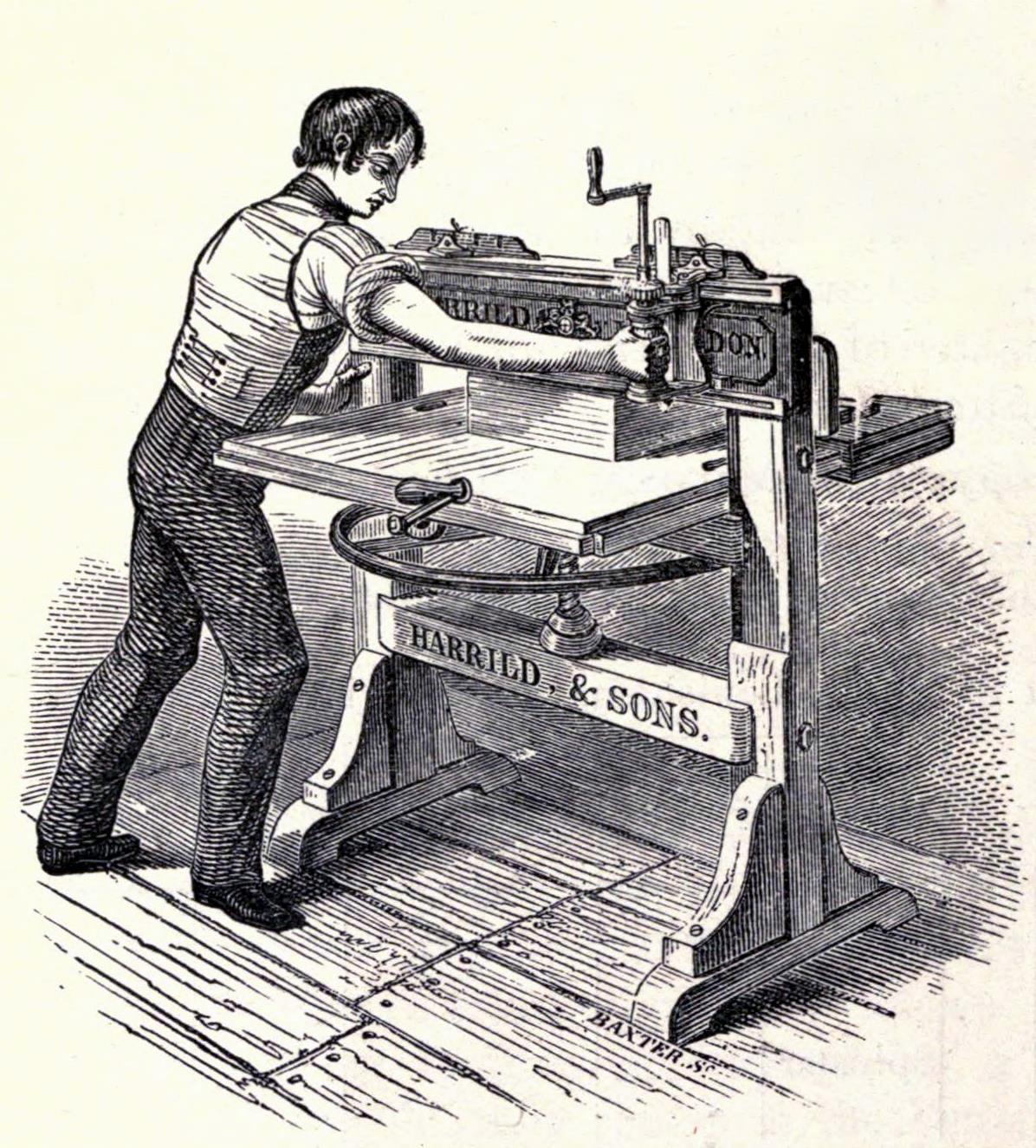
1820s old style paper cutter

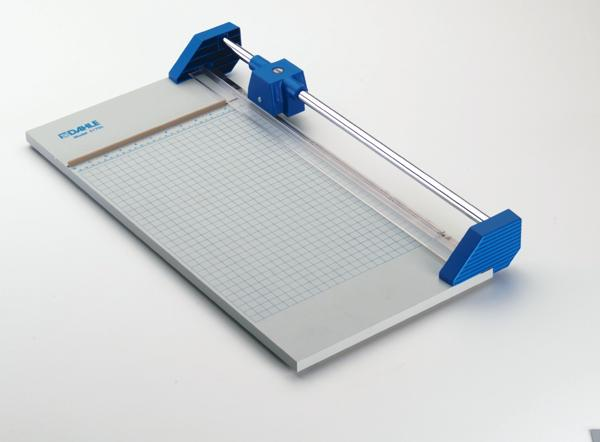
A safety (rotary) paper cutter

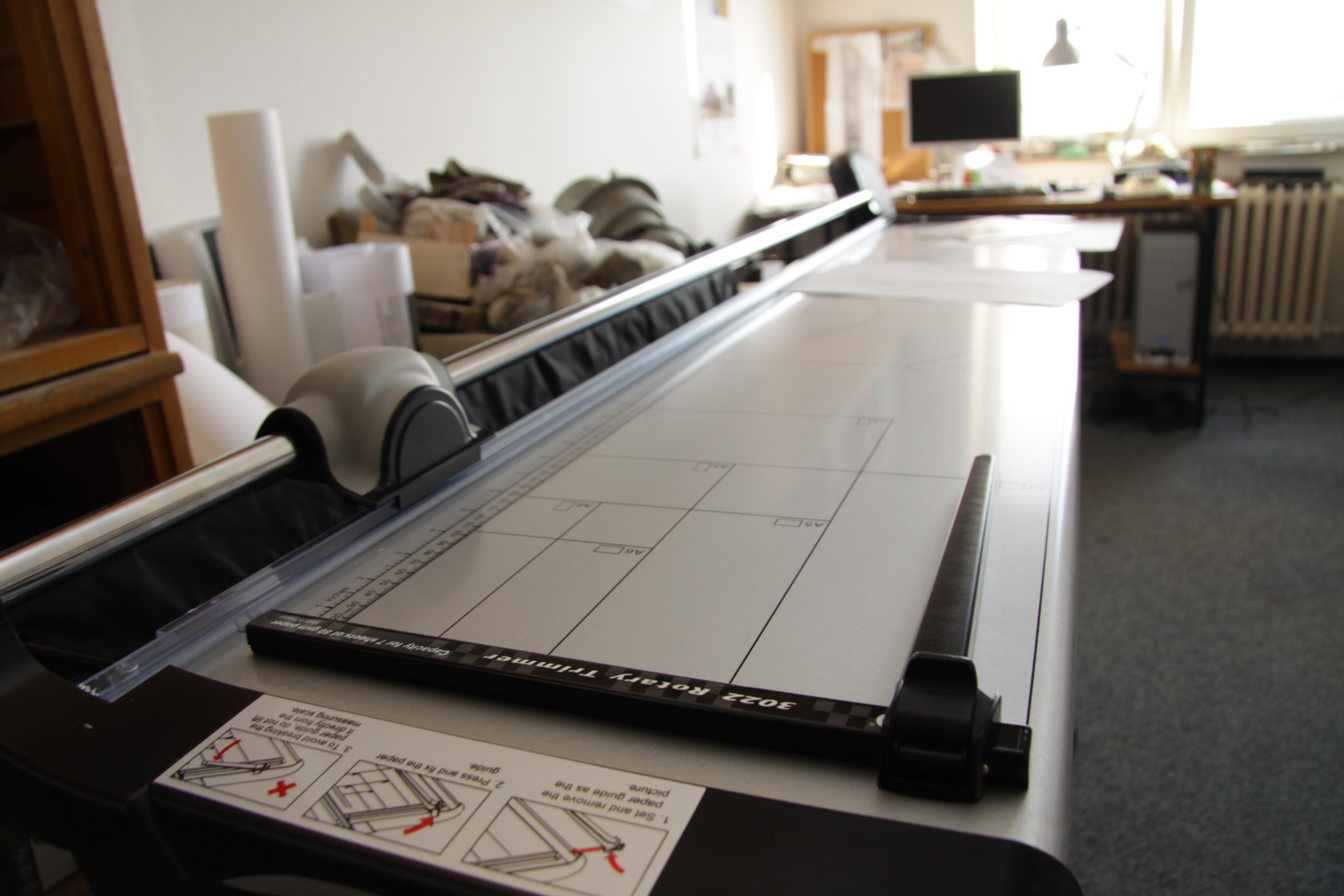
Large format paper cutter

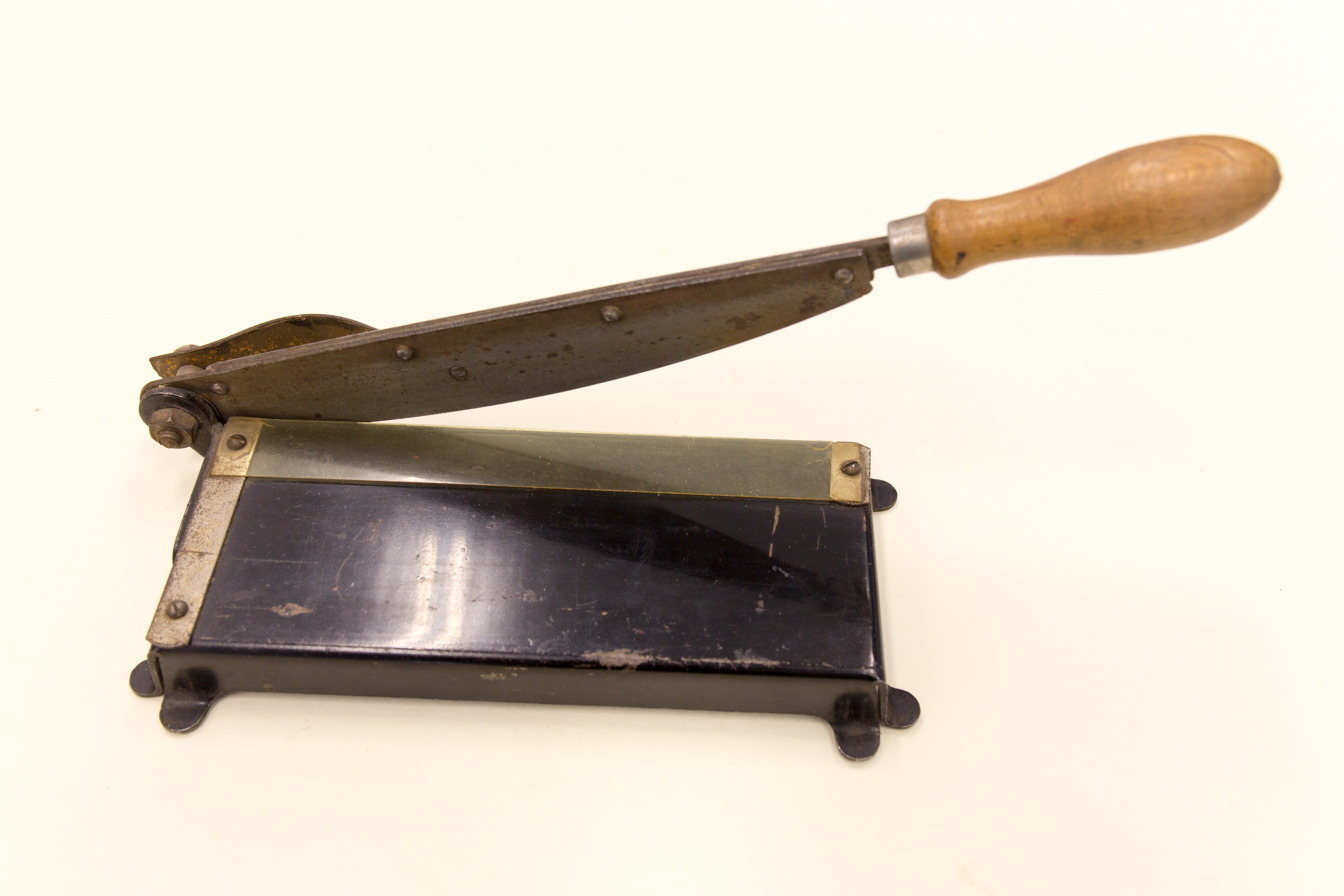
Small format paper cutter, part of the Museum Europäischer Kulturen, Berlin, Germany

A paper cutter, also known as a paper guillotine or simply a guillotine, is a tool often found in offices and classrooms. It is designed to administer straight cuts to single sheets or large stacks of paper at once.

== History ==
Paper cutters were developed and patented in 1844 by French inventor Guillaume Massiquot. Later, Milton Bradley patented his own version of the paper cutter in 1879. Since the middle of the 19th century, considerable improvements to the paper cutter have been made by Fomm and Krause of Germany, Furnival in England, and Oswego and Seybold in the United States.

== Description ==
Paper cutters vary in size, usually from approximately 30 centimeters (11.8 inches) in length on each side for office work to 841 millimetres (33.1 in), the length of a sheet of A1 paper. The surface typically has a grid that is either painted or inscribed on the surface. It may also include a ruler across the top. The surface also includes a flat edge against which the user may line up the paper at right angles before passing it under the blade.

On the right-hand edge is a long, curved steel blade, often referred to as a knife, attached to the base at one corner. Larger versions have a strong compression coil spring as part of the attachment mechanism that pulls the knife against the stationary edge as the knife is drawn down to cut the paper. The other end of the knife unit is a handle. The stationary right edge of the base is also steel, with an exposed, finely-ground edge. When the knife is pulled down to cut paper, the action resembles that of a pair of scissors; only instead of two knives moving against each other, one is stationary. The combination of a blade mounted to a steady base produces clean and straight cuts, the likes of which would have otherwise required a ruler and razor blade to achieve on a single page. Paper cutters are also used for cutting thin sheet metal, cardboard, and plastic.

A variant of this design uses a wheel-shaped blade mounted on a sliding shuttle attached to a rail. This type of paper cutter is known as a rotary paper cutter. Advantages of this design include being able to make wavy cuts, and perforations or to simply to score the paper without cutting, merely by substituting various types of circular blades. With a rotary cutter, it is also almost impossible for the user to cut oneself, except while changing the blade. This makes it safer for home use. Higher-end versions of rotary paper cutters are used for precision paper cutting and are popular for trimming photographs.

An even simpler design uses double-edged blades which do not rotate but cut like a penknife. While cheaper, this design is not preferable for serious work due to its tendency to tear paper, and poor performance with thick media.

=== Safety ===
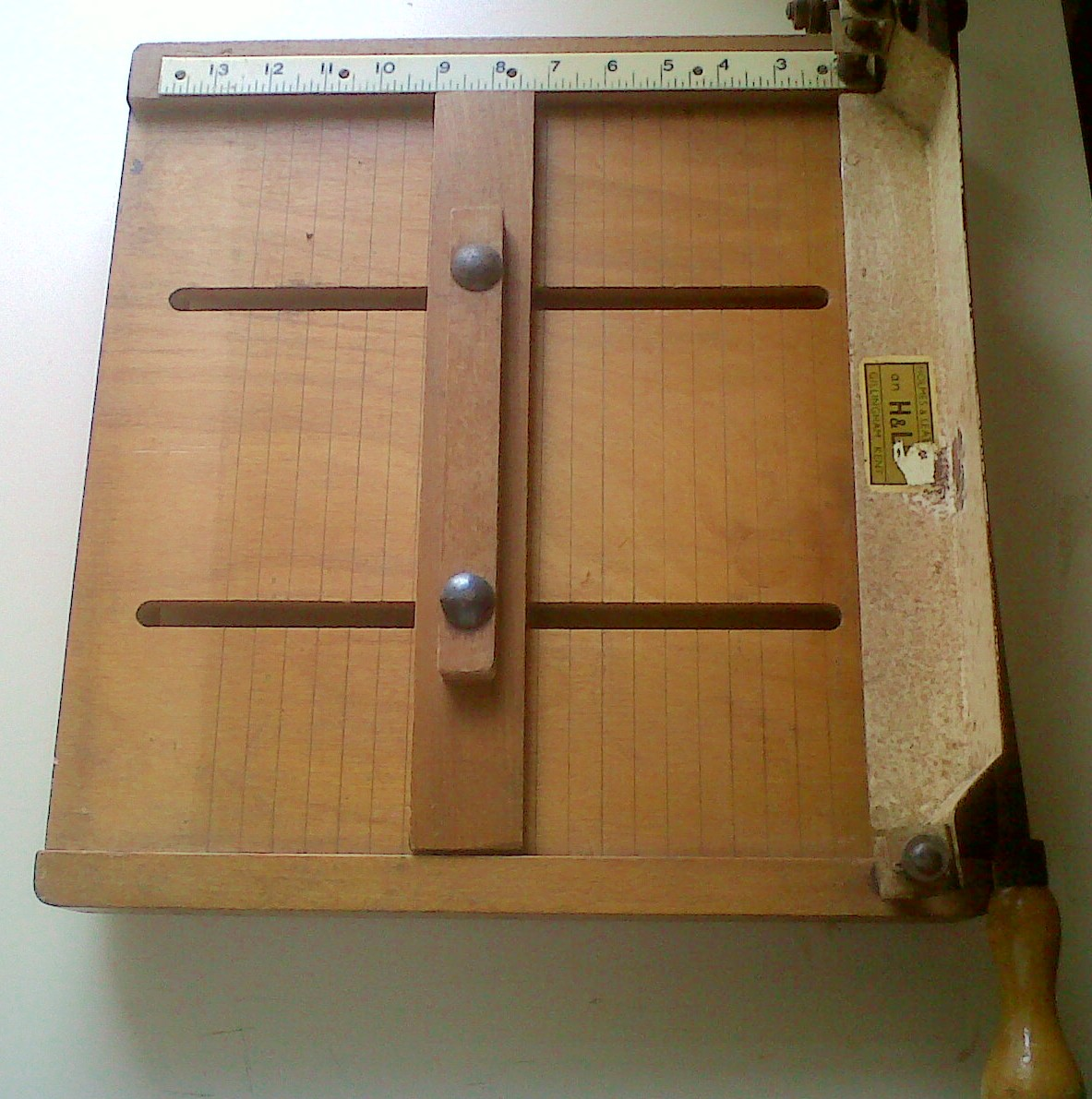
Holmes & Leather safety guillotine

Most modern paper cutters come equipped with a finger guard to prevent users from accidentally cutting themselves or severing a digit while using the apparatus. However, injuries are still possible if the device is not used with proper care or attention.

One of the first commercially successful Safety Guillotines in the UK market was designed by inventor and engineer, Verena Holmes. Sold as the Safeguard Guillotine, it was widely introduced into schools.

== Industrial paper cutters ==
In the modern paper industry, larger machines are used to cut large stacks of paper, cardboard, or similar material. Such machines operate in a manner similar to a guillotine. Commercial versions are motorized and automated, and include clamping mechanisms to prevent shifting of the material during the cutting process.

In addition to simple straight paper cutters, saw paper cutters(paper sawing machine) are widely utilized in the paper processing industry, where circular saw and band saw cutters can more efficiently cut large paper rolls, facilitating subsequent storage and processing. vinyl cutters can cut shapes or stencils out of paper, card, vinyl, or thin plastic sheets. Such cutters require vector files and cutting software to manage the cutter. Using small blades, the machine can cut shapes out of the material.

== See also ==
- Board shear
- Guillotine
- Guillotine cutting
- Scissors
