= Sheer =

Sheer may refer to:

- Sheer fabric, a semi-transparent and flimsy fabric
- Sheer (ship), a measure of longitudinal deck curvature in naval architecture
- Sheer curation, a lightweight approach to digital curation
- Sheer Islands, Nunavut, Canada
- Sheers, a form of two-legged lifting device
- Ireen Sheer, a German-British pop singer
- The Sheer, a Dutch pop band

== See also ==
- Shear (disambiguation)
- Shere
- Scheer (disambiguation)
- Sher (disambiguation)
