= Shears =

Shears may refer to:

== Cutting devices ==
- Scissors, also called shears
- Hair-cutting shears
- Blade shears, typically used for shearing animals
- Grass shears, for lawn trimming
- Kitchen shears, scissors used in the kitchen for food preparation
- Pinking shears, scissors the blades of which are sawtoothed instead of straight; they leave a zigzag pattern instead of a straight edge
- Pruning shears, for cutting branches and stems
- Snips, for cutting metal
- Trauma shears, scissors used by emergency medical personnel to cut clothing

== People ==
- Albert Shears (1900–1954), English footballer
- Augustus Shears (1827–1911), English clergyman
- Curtis Shears (1901–1988), American Olympic fencer
- Ernest Shears (1849–1917), Anglican clergyman in South Africa
- George Shears (1890–1978), Major League Baseball pitcher
- Jake Shears (born 1978), lead vocalist for the American music group Scissor Sisters
- Philip James Shears (1887–1972), British Army officer
- Stevie Shears (born 1954/5), musician known for playing in English rock bands Tiger Lily and Ultravox
- Tara Shears (born 1969), English physicist
- Daniel Towers Shears (1784–1860), English coppersmith and inventor
- James Shears (c1750-1820), English coppersmith
- James Henry Shears (1788–1855), English coppersmith and entrepreneur

== In fiction ==
- Sally Shears (also known as Molly Millions), a recurring character in stories and novels written by William Gibson

== Other ==
- Shears (moth), European moth of the family Noctuidae
- Golden Shears, sheep shearing event

== See also ==
- Shear (disambiguation)
