= Shere, Plateau State =

Shere
- Village
- Location within Nigeria
- Coordinates: 9°58′N 9°3′E
- Country: Nigeria
- State: Plateau State
- LGA: Jos East
- Elevation: 1,401 m (4,596 ft)
- Time zone: UTC+1 (WAT)

Shere is a village east of Jos city, the capital of Plateau State in central Nigeria. The village is found on hills called Shere Hills on the northern part of the Jos Plateau. The Hills got the name Shere from the village.

The village is found at an elevation of about 1,401 metres (4,596 ft) high on the hills making the village the most highly elevated village in Northern Nigeria.

Shere is a village east of Jos city, the capital of Plateau State in central Nigeria. The village is found on hills called Shere Hills on the northern part of the Jos Plateau. The Hills got the name Shere from the village.

The village is found at an elevation of about 1,401 metres (4,596 feet) high on the hills making the village the most highly elevated village in Northern Nigeria.
