= Nanosolar =

Defunct solar power developer

Nanosolar, Inc.
- Type: Private
- Industry: Solar Energy
- Founded: 2002
- Founder: Martin Roscheisen; Brian Sager
- Defunct: 2013
- Headquarters: San Jose, California, U.S.
- Key people: Eugenia Corrales (CEO); Dave Jackrel; John McAdoo; Becky Baybrook; John Bender
- Products: Solar panels
- Revenue: US$3,100,000 (2007)
- Website: www.nanosolar.com

Nanosolar was a developer of solar power technology. Based in San Jose, CA, Nanosolar developed and briefly commercialized a low-cost printable solar cell manufacturing process. The company started selling thin-film CIGS panels mid-December 2007, and planned to sell them at 99 cents per watt, much below the market at the time. However, prices for solar panels made of crystalline silicon declined significantly during the following years, reducing most of Nanosolar's cost advantage. By February 2013 Nanosolar had laid off 75% of its work force. Nanosolar began auctioning off its equipment in August 2013. Co-founder of Nanosolar Martin Roscheisen stated on his personal blog that nanosolar "ultimately failed commercially." and that he would not enter this industry again because of slow-development cycle, complex production problems and the effects of cheap Chinese solar power production. Nanosolar ultimately produced less than 50 MW of solar power capacity despite having raised more than $400 million in investment.

== Financial backers and manufacturing ==
Nanosolar was started in 2002 and headquartered in San Jose, California. The company received financing from a number of technology investors including Benchmark Capital, Mohr Davidow Ventures, and Larry Page and Sergey Brin, the founders of Google. Nanosolar received the largest amount in a round of Venture Capital technology funding amongst United States companies during Q2 2006, with US$100 million of new funding secured. It also received the largest amount of financing of any private company in 2008 (US$300 million in Q1).

Nanosolar planned to build a large production facility in San Jose, and in Germany at Luckenwalde (Berlin), with an annual capacity of 430 megawatts. Several German energy and venture capital companies have heavily invested in this company as a consequence of the favourable economics for solar energy in Germany due to government subsidies.

On December 12, 2007, the company announced that it had started solar cell production in its San Jose factory, with its German facility slated to go into operation in the 1st quarter of 2008. The company said in 2006 that the San Jose factory, when fully built, would have the capacity to produce 430 megawatts of cells each year.

On December 18, 2007, the company began shipping its first solar panels for a one-megawatt municipal power plant in Germany.

On February 17, 2012, Nanosolar announced they had achieved 115MW capacity, $20 million in additional funding to further expand manufacturing capacity and a NREL Thin-Film Solar Aperture Efficiency of 17.1%. This capacity was just over one quarter of the 430 megawatts predicted six years previously.

== Management ==
On Jan. 19, 2012, former EVP of Engineering & Operations Eugenia Corrales was named CEO following CEO Geoff Tate returning to retirement. Tate had been CEO of Nanosolar since March 22, 2010 having been hired out of retirement as an interim CEO for his experience in leading a company into volume production as CEO of Rambus. Tate replaced co-founder Martin Roscheisen who had been the company's Chairman & CEO for the past eight years; no reason was given for Roscheisen's exit.

On June 25, 2012, Nanosolar hired 3 new sales & marketing executives: Stephan Hansen, executive vice president of Worldwide Sales; Roy Shaw, head of North America Sales and Stefan Zschiegner, vice president of Worldwide Marketing. Prior to joining Nanosolar, Hansen led the European sales organization of First Solar for more than seven years. Shaw brings over 25 years of sales management experience in the solar industry. He was most recently director of USA Sales at Jinko Solar, a global PV manufacturer, producing crystalline ingots, wafers, cells, and mono- and multi- crystalline PV panels. Prior to Jinko Solar, he was head of Western Sales at Suntech Solar Corp., a global producer of silicon solar modules. Zschiegner was most recently vice president of Global Product Management and Applications at First Solar, where he focused on solutions for emerging markets, balance-of-system and module product management.

On Sep. 11, 2012, Nanosolar appointed Karl Steigele to the position of President & COO. Eugenia Corrales left the company to pursue other ventures. Before joining Nanosolar, Steigele spent more than 30 years in international management and consulting at IBM, where he worked with Fortune 500 global manufacturing companies, including Intel, Hitachi, ABB, Thomson, Siemens, Sony and McKesson, among others.

== Technology ==
The company used thin film technology to manufacture CIGS solar cells, a technology involving a semiconductor material made of copper, indium, gallium and selenium, and achieved an efficiency of up to 19.9% in laboratory samples at the time.

The company's technology gained early industry recognition with the presentation of a Small Times Magazine award at a leading nanotech business event in 2005. Technical details of Nanosolar's manufacturing techniques have been disclosed in patent applications. Some information about their process became available in a Scientific American article (in German). These details involved a semiconductor ink that it claimed would allow it to produce solar cells with a basic printing process, rather than using slow and expensive high-vacuum based thin-film deposition processes. The ink was deposited on a flexible substrate (the “paper”), and then nanocomponents in the ink aligned themselves properly via molecular self-assembly.

Nanosolar's solar cells were verified by NREL to be as efficient as 14.6% in 2006, 15.3% in 2009, and 17.1% in 2011. Efficiencies for then-current production panels were said to be 8-9%, with plans to submit panels with 10-11% efficiency for IEC certification in the fall of 2010.

In September 2009, Nanosolar announced the launch of production at a rate of 640 MW annually; however, ramp-up to volume production after the announcement took an additional six months, limiting actual production in 2009 to an estimated 4 MW, and as of August 2010 the plant was still ramping up toward its announced capacity. Since the hiring of new CEO Geoff Tate, the company declined to discuss its actual manufacturing capacity, but said that its target for 2010 was to ship panels for "several ... megawatt-size projects" and "[build] panels for projects that have been identified that can help build the case for an operating history and bankability in 2011."

Nanosolar developed a suite of in-house capabilities for creating nanostructured components based on various patented and patent-pending techniques. It used nanostructured components as the basis for creating printable semiconductors, printable transparent electrodes, novel forms of advanced nanocomposite solar-cell design and powerful new forms of barrier films.

According to the company at the time, "leveraging recent science advances in nanostructured materials, Nanosolar has developed a proprietary ink that makes it possible to simply print the semiconductor of a high-performance solar cell. This ink was based on Nanosolar developing various proprietary forms of nanoparticles and associated organic dispersion chemistry and processing techniques suitable for delivering a semiconductor of high electronic quality."

Two advantages over earlier technologies were that a printing process is quick and also makes it easy to deposit a uniform layer of the ink, resulting in a layer with the correct ratio of elements everywhere on the substrate. Also, the ink was printed only where needed, so there was less waste of material. Last, the substrate material on which the ink was printed was much more conductive and less expensive than the stainless steel substrates that are often used in thin-film solar panels.

These solar cells successfully blended the needs for efficiency, low cost, and longevity and were designed to be easy to install due to their flexibility and light weight. Estimates by Nanosolar of the cost of these cells fell roughly between 1/10 and 1/5 the industry standard per kilowatt. However, solar module prices fell dramatically since that prediction in 2006.

The company implied that their solar cells would last more than 25 years by saying they "achieve a durability compatible with our 25-year warranty." They also commissioned a study by Black and Veatch that found their 25-year warranty to be compatible with their module design.

== See also ==
- List of CIGS companies
