= Martin Roscheisen =

- Born: Munich, Germany
- Citizenship: Austrian
- Education: Technical University of Munich (B.S., 1992); Stanford University (PhD, 1997)
- Occupations: Technologist, entrepreneur
- Website: www.rmartinr.com

R. Martin Roscheisen is an Austrian-American technology entrepreneur.

== Early life ==
Roscheisen was born and raised in Munich, Germany, as an Austrian citizen. Attending Feodor Lynen high school near Munich, he graduated valedictorian in 1987. As a teenager, he spent a year at Xerox's Palo Alto Research Center (PARC) in Silicon Valley. He subsequently studied computer science and electrical engineering at Technical University of Munich, graduating at the top of his class. In 1992, he moved to California to earn a doctorate in engineering at Stanford University (with fellow students in Terry Winograd's group of the same year including Sergey Brin and Larry Page.)

== Business ==
Roscheisen was among the first generation of entrepreneurs in the late 1990s pursuing opportunities in the commercial Internet; and starting in 2000 he was one of the first entrepreneurs in Silicon Valley to focus on green energy technology:

- In 1995, Roscheisen co-founded FindLaw, which became the most widely used Internet legal site, for the first time making U.S. case law including all Supreme Court decisions accessible to the public. FindLaw is now a business unit of Thomson Reuters' West Group.

- In 1997, Roscheisen, with Stanford professor Yoav Shoham, created TradingDynamics, an enterprise software company which was acquired by Ariba for $740 million in 2000.

- In 1998, Roscheisen became founder and CEO of eGroups, an email messaging company, which was financed by Sequoia Capital and ultimately acquired by Yahoo for $450 million. (Google founder Larry Page's brother Carl was also a co-founder of eGroups.)

- In 2000, Roscheisen teamed up with Mark Pincus (today CEO of Zynga) to form an incubator called Tank Hill Projects (named after a neighborhood hill in the vicinity of which both reside in San Francisco) to create a series of new companies. Funded with an initial $10 million, the entity rapidly expanded to a headcount of 50 but shut down by October of the same year to return capital at minimum loss.

- In 2002, Roscheisen co-founded and became chairman and CEO of the first solar energy company in Silicon Valley focused on making solar power broadly affordable: Nanosolar. Nanosolar pioneered a fast process for simply printing solar cells on low-cost metal foil. Roscheisen raised more than $500 million in capital for Nanosolar (starting with Google founders, LinkedIn founder Reid Hoffman, Zynga founder Mark Pincus, Sunil Paul, VCs USVP and Benchmark Capital, hedge fund manager Steve Cohen at SAC Advisors, Passport Capital, and private equity firm Carlyle Group as well as the world's largest utility EDF and power producer AES), built a 100MW semi fab and a 640MW assembly plant, and secured $4.1 billion in customer supply contracts from EDF (the world's largest utility) and other energy utilities. Under Roscheisen, Nanosolar became a Silicon Valley flagship company in green technology, widely featured in the media including Fortune, Gigaom, the SJ Merc, Wired, VentureBeat, EDN, Motley Fool's, Business Week, USA Today, and receiving a number of outstanding awards such as the No. 1 technology innovation award in 2007 by Popular Science Magazine and TIME magazine's innovation of the year award (as No. 1, ahead of the iPhone as #2) as well as the World Economic Forum's Technology Pioneer award. After eight years as Chairman & CEO, Roscheisen left the company in 2010, with neither Roscheisen nor the company issuing any comment. Nanosolar was named a top 10 "patent power" manufacturer in 2011 by IEEE, with Roscheisen himself named inventor on more than 34 patents.

- In 2011, Roscheisen started a grid storage company in the taizhou area with backing by the Chinese government.

- In 2015, Roscheisen launched Diamond Foundry, with backing by Leonardo DiCaprio and ten billionaires.

- In November 2016, Roscheisen and Diamond Foundry purchased the jewelry brand VRAI.

== Miscellaneous ==
- In 2003 (15 September 2003), Fortune Magazine named Roscheisen as one of United States' "Top 40 under 40" (Fortune Top 40 Under 40).
- In 2007, along with Google's Larry Page and Sergey Brin, Roscheisen was an executive producer of an independent film IMDB:Roscheisen.
- Roscheisen was named a Technology Pioneer by the Davos World Economic Forum in 2007 (but chose not to attend) and was awarded TIME magazine' "most innovative product of the year".
- Roscheisen's San Francisco home was featured on the cover of Dwell magazine in 2002 for its award-winning design.
- Roscheisen is said to have inspired Allan Loeb to write the scene in Wall Street 2 where an entrepreneur raises funds for a thin-film solar company.
- Roscheisen’s great*grandfather was the Imperial Furniture Maker to King Ludwig II and the founder of the first electric utility in Europe
- In 2016, Roscheisen was named one of Silicon Valley's 100 people whose work matters most.
- Roscheisen collaborated with Apple design chief Jony Ive to create the world’s first all-diamond ring. Featured by Gagosian and auctioned by Sotheby’s, the ring fetched $450,000 for Bono’s (red).
- Pope Francis gave Roscheisen an audience on Thanksgiving Day 2021, during which he blessed his company's diamonds.
