= Anita Ramasastry =

American legal educator

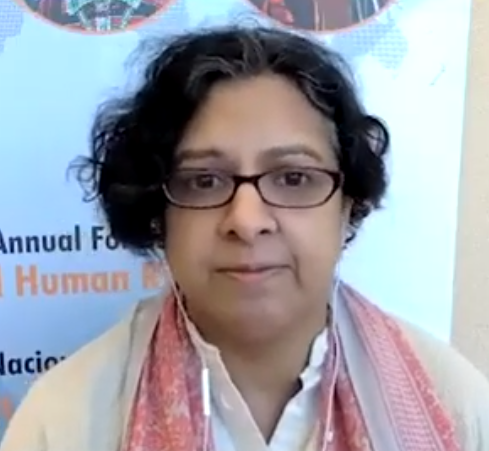
- In a UNOHCHR video in 2022

Academic background
- Education: Harvard Law School; University of Sydney

Academic work
- Discipline: Law
- Institutions: University of Washington

Anita Ramasastry is the D. Wayne & Anne Gittinger Professor of Law at the University of Washington School of Law in Seattle and a director of the Shidler Center for Law, Commerce & Technology. She is also a regular columnist for the online legal commentary Writ.

Ramasastry earned a B.A. in 1988 from Harvard University, a M.A. in 1990 from University of Sydney, and a J.D. in 1992 from Harvard Law School.

Upon graduation, she worked at the Federal Reserve Bank of New York and worked and taught in Budapest. She clerked for Justice Alan B. Handler of the New Jersey Supreme Court and has taught at University of Washington since 1996.

In 2011, Ramasastry was a senior advisor in the International Trade Administration at the U.S. Dept. of Commerce as part of the Obama administration. She worked with former Washington Governor and U.S. Secretary of Commerce Gary Locke. Ramasastry is a member of the Department of Commerce Internet Policy Task Force.

Since 2014, se his member of the International Advisory Council and Senior Research Fellow of the Institute for Human Rights and Business.

From 2016 to 2022, she was a member of the UN Working Group on Business and Human Rights.

== Awards ==
- Fulbright Senior Scholar Award, National University Ireland (Galway) (2008)
- Asia Society, Asia 21 Young Leader Fellowship (2008)
- Philip A. Trautman 1L Professor of the Year (2006, 2003, 1997)
- Outstanding Academician Award, North American South Asian Bar Association (2004)
- University of Washington Outstanding Public Service Award (for Immigrant Families Advocacy Project) (2002)
- University of Washington Distinguished Teaching Award (1998)
