= Diamond Foundry =

American lab-grown diamond company

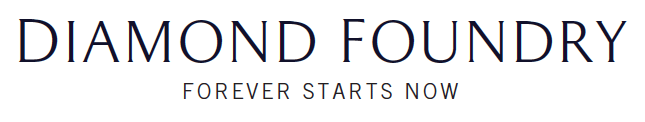
- Type: Private
- Industry: Diamonds
- Founded: 2012
- Headquarters: San Francisco, California, United States
- Products: Manmade diamonds
- Number of employees: 120
- Website: www.diamondfoundry.com

Diamond Foundry is a producer of lab grown diamonds based in San Francisco, California, USA.

== History ==
Diamond Foundry was founded in 2012 by Martin Roscheisen and Jeremy Scholz. The company raised approximately $315 million in funding from various investors, including $200 million from Fidelity, Sun Microsystems and Google founding investor Andy Bechtolsheim, iPod co-creator Tony Fadell, eBay founding president Jeff Skoll, Twitter founder Evan Williams, Facebook co-founder Andrew McCollum, actor Leonardo DiCaprio, and businessman Jean Pigozzi.

In November 2016, the company purchased Vrai and Oro, a jewelry brand founded by entrepreneur Vanessa Stofenmacher. In 2020, they rebranded as VRAI, and in 2021, opened a showroom in Los Angeles, California.

In March 2022, Diamond Foundry announced a lawsuit against the United States Trade Office in response to trade tariffs put in place against China. The company claimed the tariffs penalize businesses to an excessive degree for using polishing services in China.

In November 2025 they announced a new factory in Spain.

== Technology ==
The company used software simulations of plasma physics to develop its technology for managing a high-density plasma for diamond growth at high temperatures.

The company grows diamonds using the chemical vapor deposition (CVD) method, a vacuum deposition process in which a small piece of natural diamond is placed in a plasma reactor for a period of about two weeks. The resulting man-made diamond is essentially identical to natural diamonds (atomically, molecularly, chemically, visually, in terms of hardness, optical brilliance, crystalline structure, etc.).

== Awards and recognition ==
- "25 hottest startups that launched in 2015", by Business Insider
- One of the "Disruptor 50 Companies" in 2016, by CNBC
- "Disruptive 25" in 2016, by Inc. Magazine
- One of "The World's 50 Most Innovative Companies" in 2018 by Fast Company
