= Authoritarian leadership style =

An authoritarian (paternalistic, top-down, coercive, autocratic) leadership style is described as being as "leaders' behavior that asserts absolute authority and control over subordinates and [that] demands unquestionable obedience from subordinates." Such a leader has full control of the team, leaving low autonomy within the group. The group is expected to complete the tasks under very close supervision, while unlimited authority is self-bestowed by the leader. Subordinates' responses to the orders given are either punished or rewarded. A way that those that have authoritarian leadership behaviors tend to lean more on "...unilateral decision-making through the leader and strive to maintain the distance between the leader and his or her followers."

EBSCO Information Services contrasts authoritarian with democratic (participative), and laissez-faire (delegative) leadership styles. Based on Max Weber, Bernard Bass added the transactional leadership style of motivation by rewards and punishments.

== Background ==
Authoritarian leaders are commonly referred to as "autocratic" leaders. They sometimes, but not always, provide clear expectations for what needs to be done, when it should be done, and how it should be done. There is also a clear divide between the leader and the followers. Bob Altemeyer conducted research on what he labeled right-wing authoritarianism (RWA), and presented an analysis of the personality-types of both the authoritarian leaders and the authoritarian followers.

Authoritarian leaders make decisions independently with little or no input from others. They uphold stringent control over their followers by directly regulating rules, methodologies, and actions. Authoritarian leaders construct gaps and build distance between themselves and their followers with the intention of stressing role-distinctions. This type of leadership dates back to the earliest tribes and even empires. It is often used in present-day when there is little room for error, such as construction jobs or manufacturing jobs.

Authoritarian leadership typically fosters little creativity in decision-making. Lewin also found that it is more difficult to move from an authoritarian style to a democratic style than vice versa. Abuse of this style is usually viewed as controlling, bossy and dictatorial. Authoritarian leadership is best applied to situations where there is little time for group discussion.

Some approaches to leading make a virtue of limiting or eschewing authoritarian traits.

== Views of authoritarian leaders ==
A common belief of many authoritarian leaders is that followers require direct supervision at all times, or else they would not operate effectively. This belief is in accordance with one of Douglas McGregor's philosophical views of humankind, Theory X. This concept proposes that it is a leader's role to coerce and control followers because people have an inherent aversion to work and will abstain from it whenever possible. Theory X also postulates that people must be compelled through force, intimidation, or authority, and controlled, directed, or threatened with punishment in order to get them to accomplish the organizational needs.

In the minds of authoritarian leaders, people who are left to work autonomously will ultimately be unproductive. “Examples of authoritarian communicative behavior include a police officer directing traffic, a teacher ordering a student to do his or her assignment, and a supervisor instructing a subordinate to clean a workstation.” However, studies do show that having some form of authoritarian leader around can produce some improvement through any field of work, and daily tasks with those of authoritarian styles of leadership. In an article titled, "How Authoritarian Leadership Affects Employee's Helping Behavior? The Mediating Role of Rumination and Moderating Role of Psychological Ownership," states that having this form of leadership actually helps. However, this is done by having the other party instill the same effort by the other party. This means that the other party has to positive behaviors, have commitment, are wanting to work, and respect the leadership above them, they are willing to see growth and have achievement throughout the relationship of the leader and the citizen.

=== Communication patterns ===
- Downward, one-way communication (i.e. leaders to followers, or supervisors to subordinates)
- Controls discussion with followers
- Dominates interaction
- Independently/unilaterally sets policy and procedures
- Individually directs the completion of tasks
- Does not offer constant feedback
- Rewards acquiescent obedient behavior and punishes erroneous actions
- Poor listener
- Uses conflict for individual gain
- Limited communication and control
- Can increase perceptions of abusive behavior.
- Cultural background affects how authoritarian leadership is viewed.

=== Ways to properly incorporate authoritarian leadership ===
- Always explain rules: it allows your subordinates to complete the task you want to be done efficiently.
- Be consistent: if you are to enforce rules and regulations, make sure to do so regularly so your subordinates take you seriously. This will form a stronger level of trust.
- Respect your subordinates: always recognize your subordinates' efforts and achievements.
- Educate your subordinates by enforcing rules: do not present them with any surprises. This can lead to problems in the future due to false communication.
- Listen to suggestions from your subordinates, even if you do not incorporate them.

=== Effects of authoritarian leadership communication styles ===
- Increase in productivity when the leader is present
- Produces more accurate solutions when the leader is knowledgeable
- Is more positively accepted in larger groups
- Enhances performance on simple tasks and decreases performance on complex tasks
- Increases aggression levels among followers
- Increases turnover rates
- Successful when there is a time urgency for completion of projects
- Improves the future work of those subordinates whose skills are not very applicable or helpful without the demands of another

=== Downfalls ===
- Long-term use can cause resentment from subordinates.
- It has been found by researchers that these types of leaders lack creative problem solving skills
- Without proper instruction and understanding from subordinates, confusion may arise
- A lot of emotional strain and stress for workers can be created because of authoritarian leadership. When leaders use a lot of pressure and control, it can lead to burnout and possibly lower job satisfaction. Workers may feel stressed when they think their efforts aren't being recognized or unfairly criticized. Over time, this can affect their motivation and overall well-being.
- Authoritarian leadership is connected to higher employee turnover over time. Research suggests that this leadership style can reduce job satisfaction and engagement, making employees feel less connected to the organization and more likely to leave. While it may effectively achieve short-term goals, the lack of collaboration can create a workplace environment where employees feel undervalued or overly controlled. This can contribute to more employees leaving, especially when workers seek roles with more autonomy or supportive leadership styles.

== Examples of authoritarian leaders ==
Engelbert Dollfuss, chancellor of Austria from 1932 to 1934, destroyed the Austrian Republic and established an authoritarian regime based on conservative Roman Catholic and Italian Fascist principles. In May 1932 when he became chancellor, Dollfuss headed a conservative coalition led by the Christian Social Party. When faced with a severe economic crisis caused by the Great Depression, Dollfuss decided against joining Germany in a customs union, a course advocated by many Austrians. Severely criticized by Social Democrats, Pan-German nationalists, and Austrian Nazis, he countered by drifting toward an increasingly authoritarian regime.

The Italian leader Benito Mussolini became Dollfuss' principal foreign ally. Italy guaranteed Austrian independence at Riccione (August 1933), but in return Austria had to abolish all political parties and reform its constitution on the Fascist model. In March 1933, Dollfuss’ attacks on Parliament culminated that September in the permanent abolition of the legislature and the formation of a corporate state based on his Vaterländische Front (“Fatherland Front”); with which he expected to replace Austria's political parties. In foreign affairs, he steered a course that converted Austria virtually into an Italian satellite state. Hoping therewith to prevent Austria's incorporation into Nazi Germany, he fought his domestic political opponents along fascist-authoritarian lines.

In February 1934 paramilitary formations loyal to the chancellor crushed Austria's Social Democrats. With a new constitution of May 1934, his regime became completely dictatorial. In June, however, Germany incited the Austrian Nazis to civil war. Dollfuss was assassinated by the Nazis in a raid on the chancellery.
