= Conservatives without Conscience =

2006 book by John Dean

- Cover of the first edition
- Author: John Dean
- Publisher: Viking Press
- Publication date: July 2006
- Media type: Print (Hardcover and Paperback)
- Pages: 188
- ISBN: 978-0-670-03774-2
- OCLC: 67384273
- Dewey Decimal: 320.520973 22
- LC Class: JC573.2.U6 D43 2006

Conservatives without Conscience is a book written by John Dean, who served as White House Counsel under U.S. President Richard Nixon and then helped to break the Watergate scandal with his testimony before the United States Senate. The book analyzes the evolution of the Republican Party, and the different forms of conservatism, largely in terms of authoritarian personality. It was published in 2006 by Viking Press.

The book makes extensive use of the research into right-wing authoritarianism of University of Manitoba professor Bob Altemeyer. The title is a play on The Conscience of a Conservative, a seminal book attributed to the Republican nominee in the 1964 presidential campaign, U.S. Senator Barry Goldwater, but ghostwritten by L. Brent Bozell Jr. Dean claims that he and Goldwater had planned to write such a book in the 1980s in response to their disaffection with the Religious Right.
