= Shearing (surname) =

Shearing is a surname. Notable people with the surname include:

- Dinah Shearing (1928–2021), Australian actress
- George Shearing (1919–2011), British jazz pianist
- Miriam Shearing (born 1935), American lawyer and judge
- Peter Shearing (born 1938), English footballer

== See also ==
- Sherring
