= Board shear =

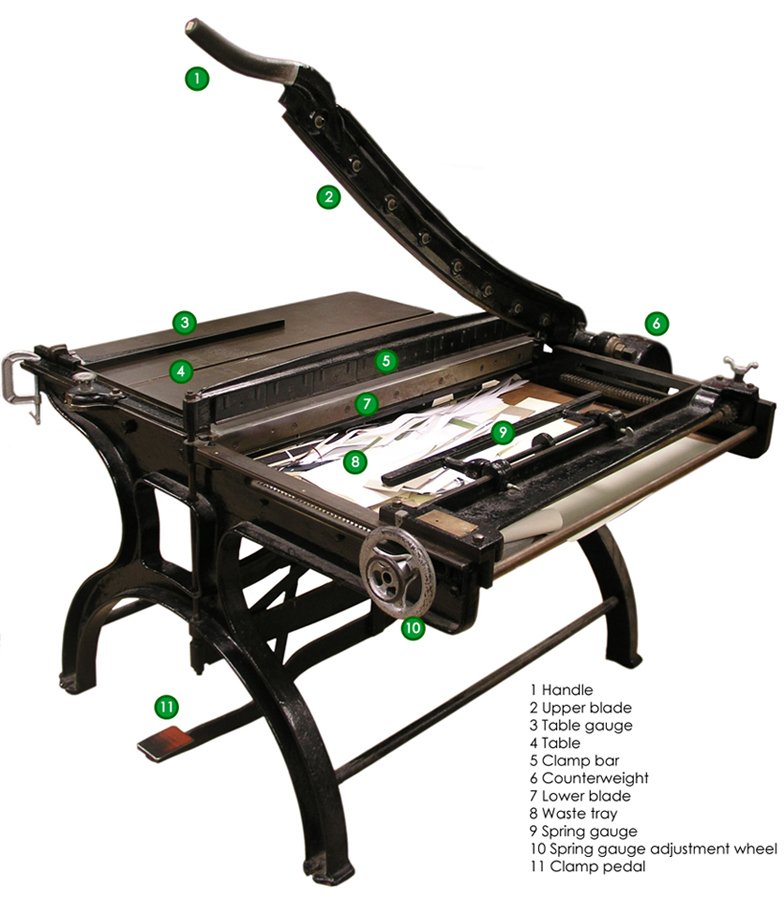
Board shear

Used extensively in bookbinding, a board shear is a large, hand-operated machine for cutting board or paper. Like scissors, a board shear uses two blades to apply shear stress exceeding the paper's shear strength in order to cut. The stationary blade forms the edge of the cutting table, with the moving blade mounted on a cutting arm. Originally known as a table gauge shear because its gauge allowed the cutting of consistently-sized materials, the board shear resembles a larger version of the paper cutters commonly found in offices.

The earliest known reference to a board shear comes from an 1842 supplement to Penny Magazine, titled A Day at a Bookbinder's, which included a drawing of a board shear with many of the major developments already present. An 1854 article on the history of bookbinding from The Bookbinder's Trade Circular describes early board shears, and places their development in "about 1836"; credit for the invention is ascribed to Warren De La Rue in the Reports of the Juries from the Great Exhibition of 1851.

Many modifications of the basic design were made in the 19th century, with changes such as rack-and-pinion adjustment for the outer gauge and improved clamp bars.

== See also ==
- Paper cutter
