= Elke Scheer =

German physicist

Elke Scheer (born 1965) is a German experimental condensed matter physicist whose research focuses on the transport of electrical charge at the single-molecule scale and related effects, including molecular electronics and mesoscale superconductivity. She is a professor of physics at the University of Konstanz, where she heads the Mesoscopic Systems Group.

== Education and career ==
Scheer earned a diploma in physics (the German equivalent of a master's degree) in 1990, at the Karlsruhe Institute of Technology, through research supervised by Hilbert von Löhneysen. Continuing to work with von Löhneysen at the Karlsruhe Institute of Technology, she completed a doctorate (Dr. rer. nat.) in 1995.

After postdoctoral research at CEA Paris-Saclay, she returned to the Karlsruhe Institute of Technology as an assistant professor in 1997. She took her present position as a professor at the University of Konstanz in 2000.

== Recognition ==
Scheer received the 1999 Gustav Hertz Prize of the German Physical Society, and the 2000 Alfried Krupp Prize for Young Professors. She is a member of the Heidelberg Academy of Sciences and Humanities, elected in 2009.
