= Shere Hills =

Hill in Nigeria

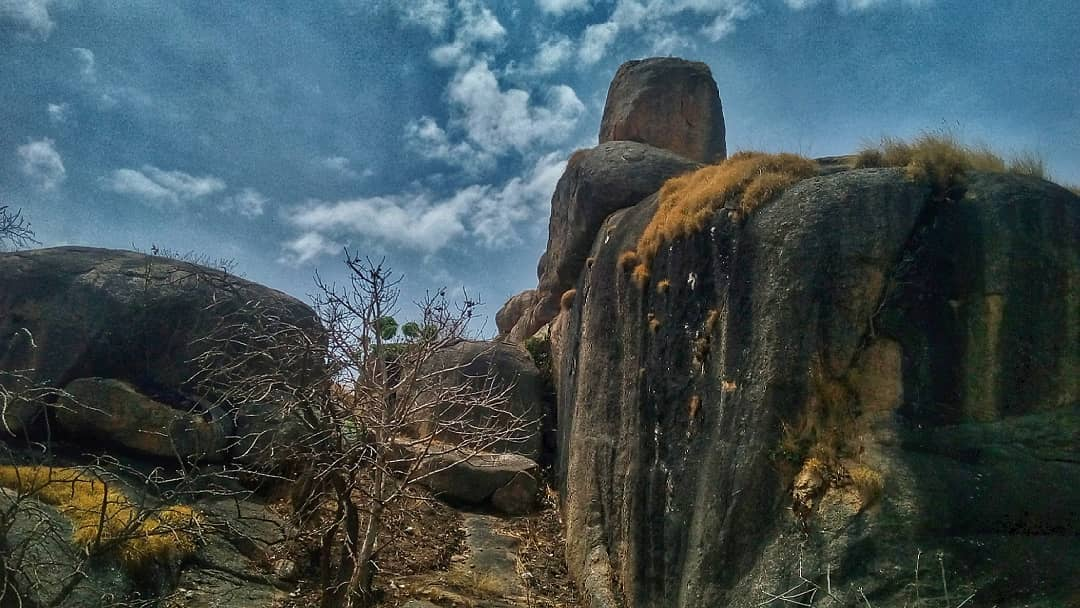

Highest point
- Elevation: 1,759 m (5,771 ft)
- Prominence: 1,317 m (4,321 ft)
- Listing: Ribu
- Coordinates: 9°57′N 9°03′E

Geography
- Location within Nigeria
- Location: Nigeria

The Shere Hills are a range of undulating hills and rock formations on the Jos Plateau, situated about 10 kilometres (6.2 miles) east of the Jos metropolis, the capital of Plateau State in the Middle Belt region of Nigeria.

== Peaks ==
The Shere Hills have numerous high peaks, with the highest reaching about 1,759 metres or 5,771 feet above sea level. The Shere Hills are the highest point of the Jos Plateau and the third highest point in Nigeria, after Chappal Waddi on the Mambilla Plateau averaging about 2,419 metres or 7,936 feet above sea level and Mount Dimlang (Vogel peak) on the Shebshi Mountains reaching a height of about 2,042 metres or 6,699 feet above sea level.

== See also ==
- Shere, Plateau State
