= Christopher Scheer =

American writer

Christopher Scheer (born September 8, 1968) is an American writer and editor. He is the son of veteran journalist Robert Scheer, and has co-authored two Los Angeles Times bestsellers with him.

== Biography ==
Scheer was born in Berkeley, California. His parents are lawyer Anne Butterfield Weills and journalist Robert Scheer.

A graduate of Berkeley High School (1985) and UC Santa Barbara (1990), he co-founded and edited Prognosis, an English-language newspaper in Prague. Later, he worked with Oliver Stone as a creative consultant on the academy-award nominated script for Nixon, as well as several unproduced scripts.

After working as an editor at The San Francisco Examiner for several years, as well as writing for The Nation, the Los Angeles Times and other publications, he launched the news/activism website Workingforchange.com for Working Assets, then moved on to become the managing editor of the alternative news site, Alternet. Currently, he teaches debate, mock trial, and journalism at Skyline High School in Oakland, California. He is the advisor for Skyline's national award-winning student newspaper The Oracle.

Scheer is the co-author, with his father Robert Scheer and Lakshmi Chaudhry, of The Five Biggest Lies Bush Told Us About Iraq, published in 2003 in the US, the United Kingdom and Australia. The book appeared on the Los Angeles Times bestseller list and was a part of the national debate in 2004 about the then still popular Iraq War. In 2010 he co-authored The Great American Stickup with his father, which also appeared on the Los Angeles Times bestseller list. In 2016, he co-authored California Comeback: How a 'Failed State' Became a Model for the Nation with Narda Zacchino.
