= Shear (surname) =

Shear is a surname. Notable people with the surname include:

- Barry Shear (1923–1979), American film director and producer
- Byron D. Shear (1869–1929), American politician
- Claudia Shear (born 1962), American actress and playwright
- Cornelius Lott Shear (1865–1956), American mycologist and plant pathologist
- David Shear (1896–1968), American businessperson and politician
- David B. Shear (born 1954), American diplomat
- Emmett Shear, American Internet entrepreneur
- Harold E. Shear (1918–1999), American Navy admiral
- Joe Shear (1943–1998), American race car driver
- Jules Shear (born 1952), American singer-songwriter
- Linda Shear (born 1948), American musician
- Marie Shear (1940–2017), American writer and activist
- Matthew Shear (born 1984), American actor
- Michael D. Shear, American journalist
- Rhonda Shear (born 1954), American entertainer and entrepreneur
- Tom Shear, American musician and music producer
- Wayne G. Shear Jr., American Navy admiral
- William Shear (born 1942), American zoologist
