= Jos Plateau =

Plateau in Nigeria

Coordinates: 9°34′00″N 9°05′00″E

Jos Plateau Jos Plateau forest-grassland mosaic
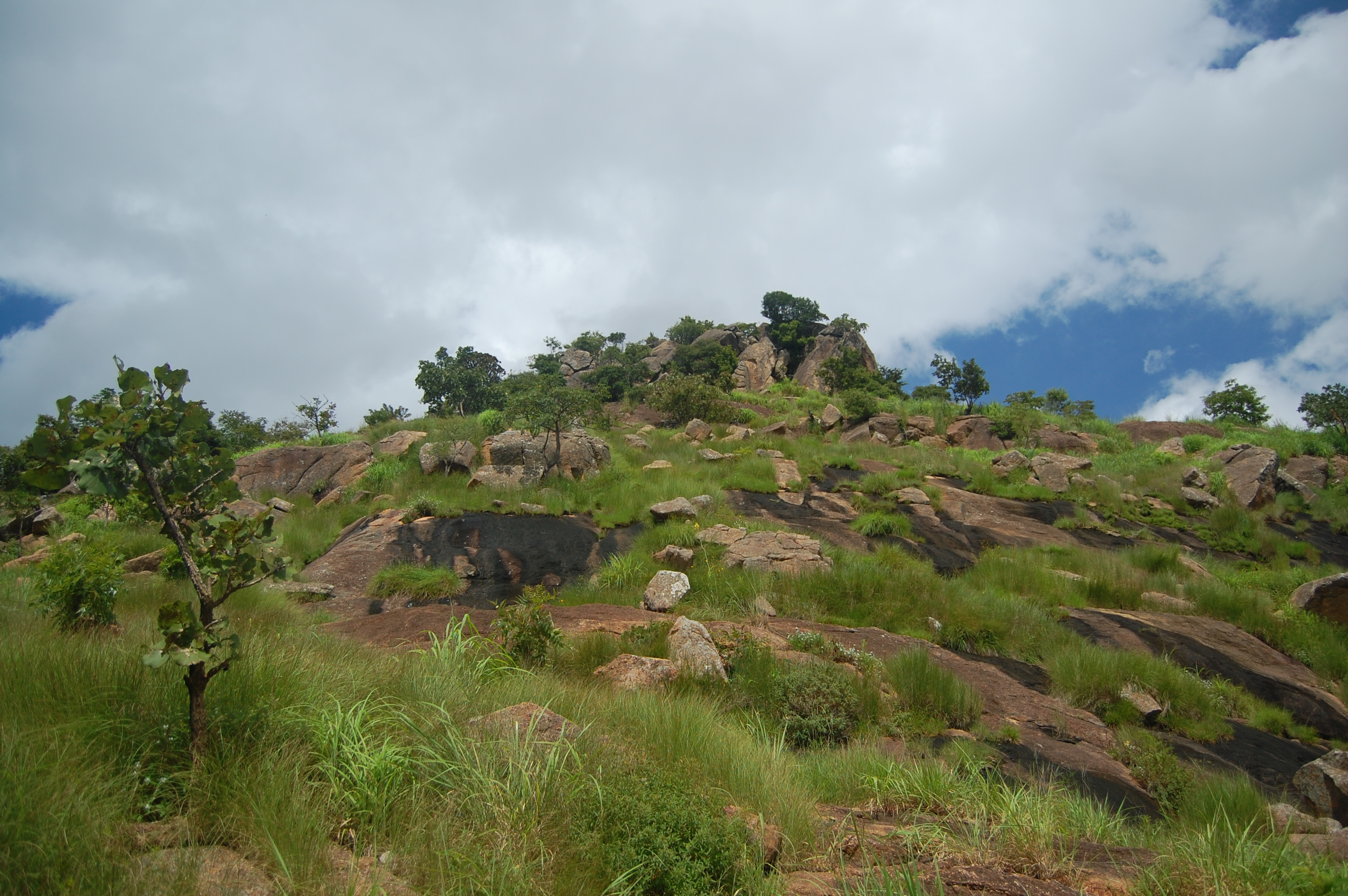
- Hillside near Jos

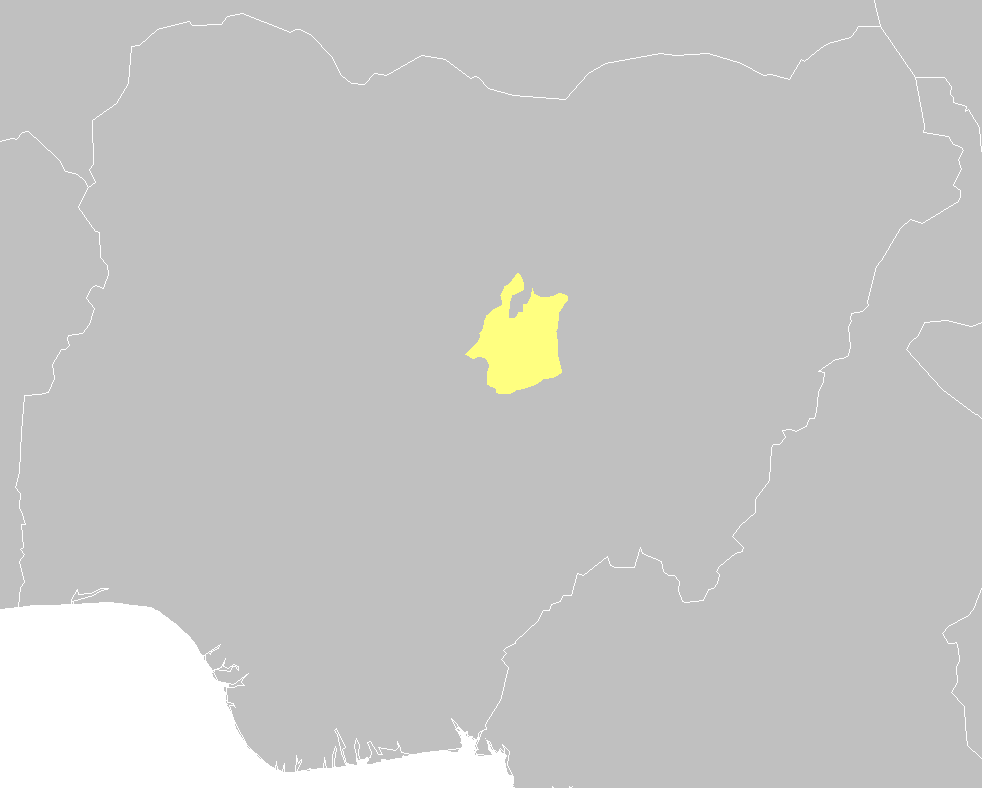
- Location of the Jos Plateau

Ecology
- Realm: Afrotropical
- Biome: montane grasslands and shrublands
- Borders: Guinean forest-savanna mosaic; West Sudanian savanna

Geography
- Area: 13,281 km^{2} (5,128 mi^{2})
- Country: Nigeria
- States: Plateau; Bauchi; Kaduna

Conservation
- Conservation status: Critical/endangered
- Protected: 1,199 km^{2} (9%)

The Jos Plateau (formerly known as the Bauchi Plateau) is a plateau located near the centre of Nigeria. The plateau has given its name to the Plateau State in which it is found and is named for the state's capital, Jos. The plateau is home to people of diverse cultures and languages. The plateau's montane grasslands, savannas, and forests are home to communities of plants and animals distinct from those of the surrounding lowlands and constitute the Jos Plateau forest-savanna mosaic ecoregion.

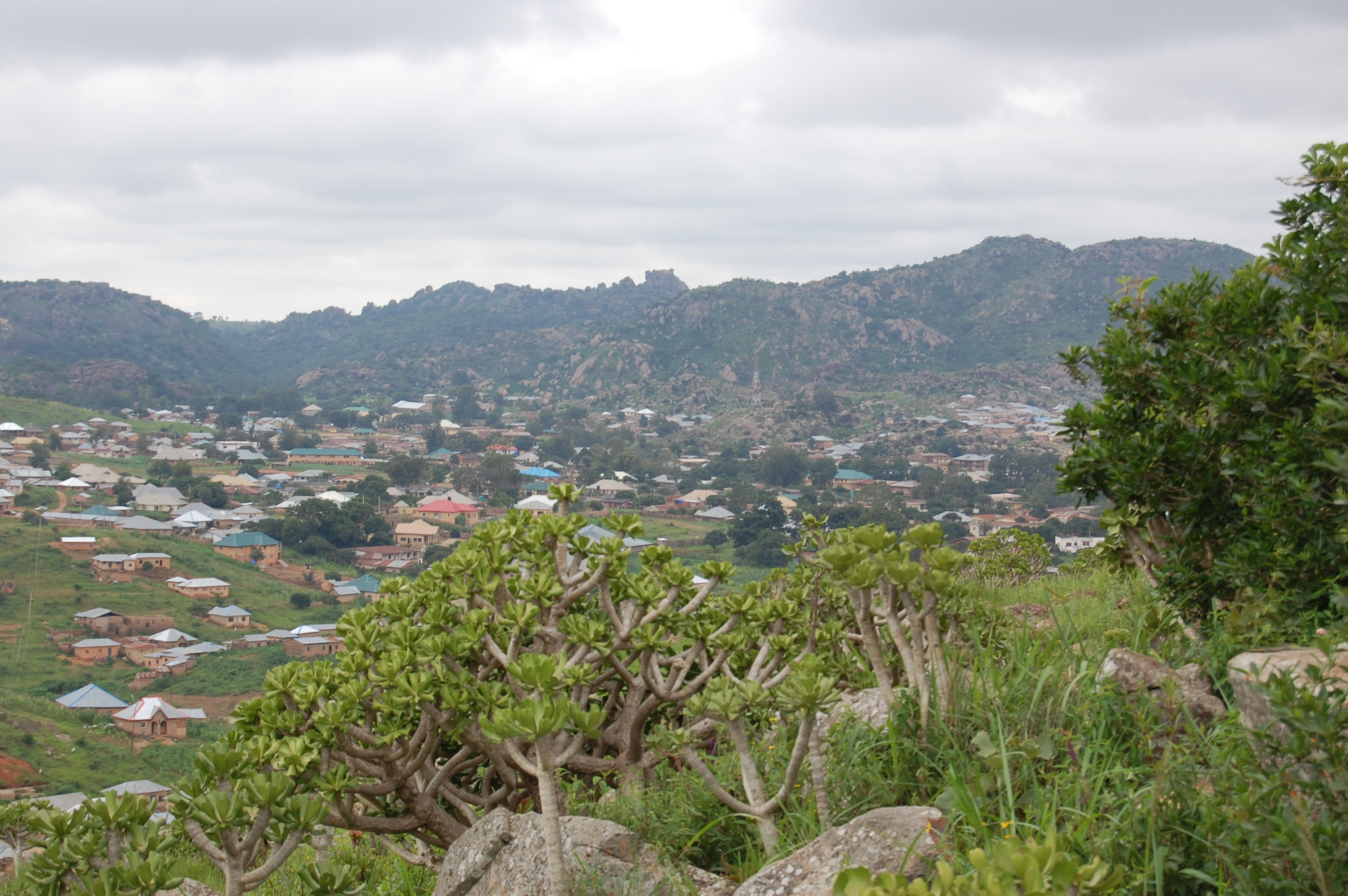
North-Eastern part of Jos, Nigeria (2012)

At the start of the 20th century, the British established Jos as a tin-mining metropolis. Many individuals from Southern and Northern Nigeria came to Jos for work and business because of the tin industry on the plateau. Situated in North-Central Nigeria, the area consists of rolling hills on a plateau. Because of its diverse range of landforms and stunning scenery, the Jos Plateau is a popular tourist destination.

== Geography ==
It covers 8600 km^{2} and is largely bounded by 300–600 m (980–1,970 ft) escarpments. With an average altitude of 1,280 m (4,200 ft), it is the largest area over 1,000 m (3,300 ft) in Nigeria, with a high point of 1,776 m (5,827 ft), in the Shere Hills. Several rivers have their sources on the plateau. The Kaduna River drains the western slopes, flowing southwest to join the Niger. The Gongola River drains eastwards to join the Benue. The Hadejia and Yobe rivers flow northeast into Lake Chad.

=== Geology ===
The Jos Plateau is dominated by three rock types. The older granites date to the late Cambrian and Ordovician. The younger granites are emplacements dating to the Jurassic and form part of a series that includes the Aïr Massif in the central Sahara. There are also many volcanoes and sheets of basalt extruded since the Pliocene. The younger granites contain tin which was mined since the beginning of the 20th century, during and after the colonial period.

== Climate ==
The climate on the plateau is tropical but cooler than the surrounding lowlands. Average temperatures range from 15.5 °C to 18.5 °C in the coolest months to 27.5 °C to 30.5 °C during the hottest months. Rainfall ranges from 2,000 mm (79 in) per year in the southwest to 1,500 mm (59 in) or less in the drier northeast. Rainfall for the town of Jos averages 1,411 mm per year. Rainfall is highly seasonal, falling mostly between June and September with July and August the wettest months. Moisture-bearing winds come from the south and west, and rainfall is higher on the windward south- and west-facing slopes.

== Flora and fauna ==
The natural vegetation of the region was likely a mosaic of savanna, open woodland, and forest. Human activities have reduced the plateau's tree cover, and most of the plateau is now covered by open grassland. Small areas of woodland and forest remain on steep and inaccessible sites, including the southern and western escarpments, along rivers, and at the base of rock outcrops. The plateau is home to West Africa’s only population of klipspringer (Oreotragus oreotragus), as well as several endemic birds and mammals, including the Nigerian mole-rat (Cryptomys foxi), Fox's shaggy rat (Dasymys foxi), rock firefinch (Lagonosticta sanguinodorsalis), and Jos Plateau indigobird (Vidua maryae).

== People ==
The Jos Plateau lies in the Nigerian Middle Belt, and even in this region known for cultural diversity, it is unusually diverse. Barbour et al. (1982:49) show over 60 ethno-linguistic groups on the plateau. Most of the plateau's languages are in the Chadic family, which is part of the Afro-Asiatic family. Two of the Plateau's largest ethnic groups are the Berom, in the northern Plateau, and the Ngas in the southeast. Smaller groups include the Mwaghavul, Pyem, Ron, Afizere, Anaguta, Aten, Irigwe, Chokfem, Kofyar, Kulere, Miship, Mupun and Montol.

The state's 3.2 million inhabitants are made up of more than 50 ethnic groups out of Nigeria's 374 tribes, making it a tiny version of Nigeria in terms of variety. In addition, the state is home to sizeable populations of Hausa-Fulani, Igbo, and Yoruba immigrants (also known as farmers as opposed to herders who go around).

The Jos Plateau is home to the ancient Nok culture, known for its remarkable terracotta artwork. After the British colonization of Nigeria, Jos Plateau became a mining region and one of the most important tourist destinations in Nigeria, but touristic activity was impeded in early 21st century by a new conflict between Christians and Muslims as a result of tribal and political differences between the inhabitants of the Jos Plateau.

== Threats and conservation ==
The Jos plateau is a heavily populated area with loss of native savanna and woodland to farmland conversion and firewood collection; remaining native fauna is predominantly limited to small areas in the more remote areas and river embankments. There is currently no conservation program for this eco-region. Due to tin mining activity some 320 km^{2} of agricultural land has been disturbed. The situation has been improved since by local farmers due to usage of traditional as well as modern fertilisation methods which combined includes manure, urban waste ash and inorganic fertilizers. Approximately 1,199 km^{2}, or 9%, of the ecoregion is in protected areas. Protected areas include the Jarawa Hill, Jere, Rafin Bawa, Panshanu, Guram River, Assob Bachit, Kurra Jekko, and Abak River forest reserves.
