= FindLaw =

Online provider of legal information

- Company type: Legal
- Headquarters: El Segundo, CA
- Owner: Internet Brands
- Founders: Stacy Stern; Martin Roscheisen; Tim Stanley
- Website: www.findlaw.com
- Commercial: Yes
- Launched: December 13, 1995

FindLaw is a business of Internet Brands that provides online legal information in the form of state laws, case law and codes, legal blogs and articles, a lawyer directory, DIY legal services and products, and other legal resources. It also provides online marketing services for law firms.

Founded in 1995 by Stacy Stern, Martin Roscheisen, and Tim Stanley, the company was acquired by Thomson West five years later. Then, in December 2024, MH Sub I, LLC (also known as Internet Brands) completed the purchase of Findlaw.

== Background ==
FindLaw.com began in Silicon Valley when its founders compiled a list of attorney resources for a group of law librarians in Northern California. Based on the positive sentiment from the librarians, the founders decided to publish this information as a public legal resource on the domain FindLaw.com.

Though there was a formal launch of FindLaw.com on January 9, 1996, the domain was first registered December 13. 1995. The website soon offered a wide array of legal content and resources for both attorneys and consumers, including a lawyer directory, an online career center and message boards like the famous "Greedy Associates" which exists today on the FindLaw.com website as a popular blog.

== History ==
=== 1995–2001: early years ===
In 1995, two attorneys compiled a list of lawyer resources for a group of California law librarians and then published that list online. The attorneys registered the domain findlaw.com on December 13, 1995. They had an official public launch of the website in January 1996. By June 1996, there was an interactive online continuing legal education course offering. The following year saw the launch of LegalMinds, followed the year after by JusticeMail (sunsetted in 2021).

FindLaw.com won gold medals for best legal website in 1997, 1998, and 1999.

By the end of 1999, FindLaw had both acquired LawyerMarketing.com to launch FindLaw Lawyer Marketing and made available free access to legal briefs. In 1999 it also launched its FirmSite service, providing website design and content services for attorneys.

In the start of 2000, FindLaw created partnerships with The New York Times, The Washington Post, CNN Interactive, EarthLink, Quicken, USA Today, and other media for sharing content.

By midyear of 2000, FindLaw offered the first legal portal to support personalization through "My FindLaw". By October of the same year, FindLaw launched an extensive and comprehensive lawyers and law firm directory for the entire United States.

=== 2002–present: growth under Thomson Reuters ===
In 2001, Thomson West (formerly West Publishing company, currently Thomson Reuters) acquired FindLaw.

FindLaw surpassed $100 million in yearly revenue in 2007, and $200 million in 2012.

It launched Web Advantage and video services in 2008. In 2009, FindLaw expanded internationally by acquiring Contract Law in the UK (divested in 2012). It began providing website services to international law firms the following year.

Between 2010 and 2013, FindLaw significantly increased its footprint in the online legal network and directory space by acquiring SuperLawyers (2010), a business that recognizes the top attorneys in the U.S., and LawInfo.com (2013). The LawInfo acquisition included Abogado.com, a Spanish language website that provides legal information and a lawyer directory to Spanish speakers in the U.S.

Also in 2010, FindLaw provided a blog option to its website clients. The posts were later promoted on Facebook when FindLaw launched social media services (2015).

FindLaw debuted do-it-yourself estate planning and business formation services in 2022, allowing consumers to create simple estate plans and form simple business entities.

In October 2024, Thomson Reuters sold FindLaw to Internet Brands.

== Products and services of FindLaw.com ==
The website FindLaw.com includes extensive legal information presented in the form of U.S. case law found on caselaw.findlaw.com, and in comprehensive review like in the case of Tinker v. Des Moines School District (1969) that helped define first amendment rights of students in the United States. FindLaw.com also presents state and federal statutes like in the legal summary of California Marijuana Laws that details the legality of possession and use of cannabis in the state of California. U.S. codes are published on codes.findlaw.com and present common codes like New York's consolidated laws for labor laws. FindLaw.com also offers legal articles and blogs on a wide range of historical and new legal cases and codes like the 2022 overturn of Roe v Wade.

The website FindLaw.com also includes a free attorney directory on lawyers.findlaw.com that allows consumers to browse and select lawyers by their geographical location and practice areas of the law.

The website FindLaw.com also offers DIY services and products for consumers in need of legal assistance.

The company also published the magazine Writ, whose contributors (mostly legal academics) argued, explained, and debated legal matters of topical interest.
