= Maureen Dean =

American writer

Dean's 1975 memoir

Maureen "Mo" Dean (born Maureen Elizabeth Kane, October 10, 1945) is an American writer and former political figure, best known as the wife of John Dean, the White House counsel involved in the Watergate scandal. She testified before the Senate Watergate Committee and authored Mo: A Woman's View of Watergate (1975), a memoir about the event, with Hays Gorey. She later wrote two novels inspired by her experience in the capital, Washington Wives (1987), and Capitol Secrets (1992).
