= Robert Scheer =

American journalist (born 1936)

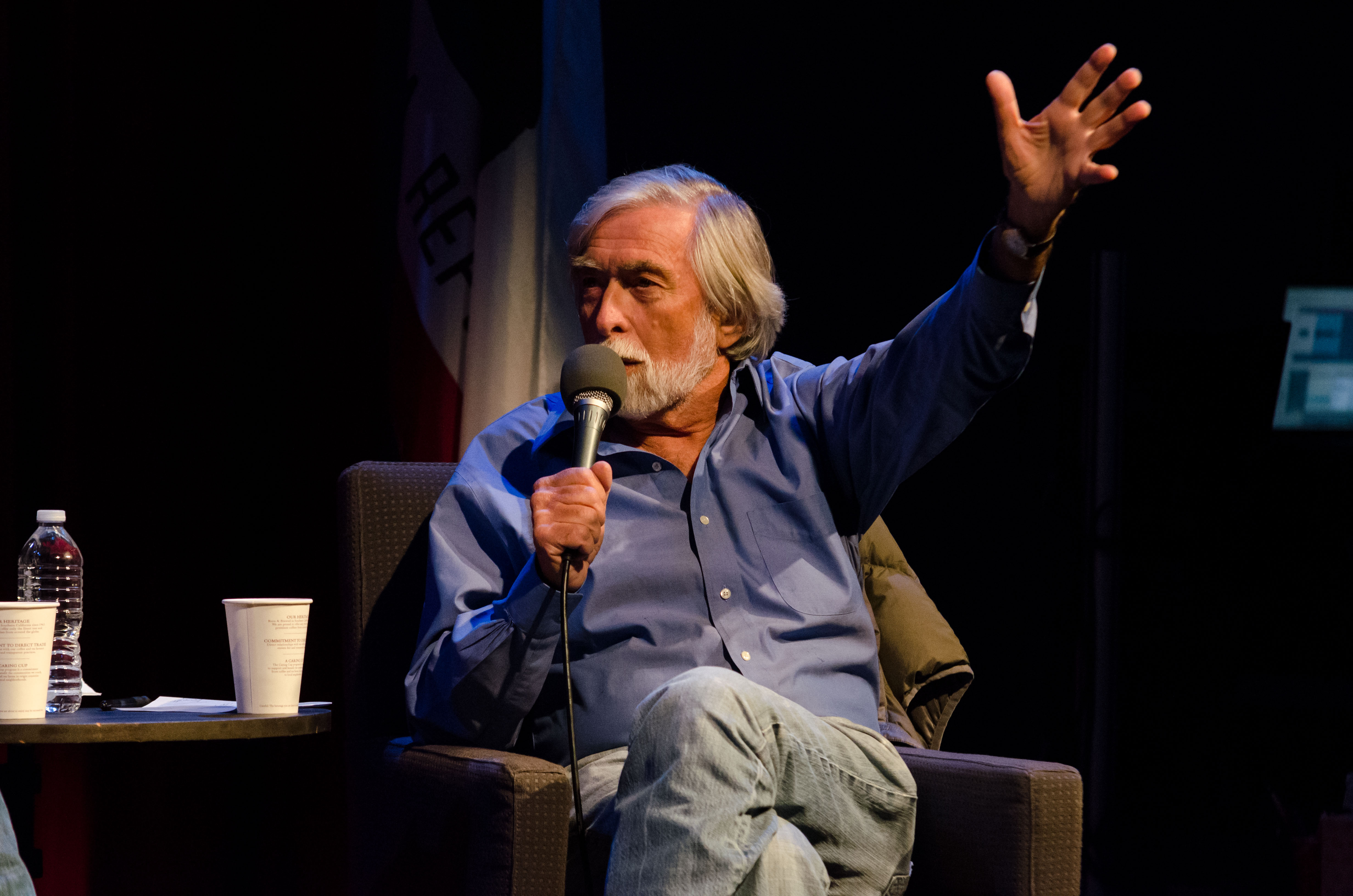
- Born: April 4, 1936 (age 90); New York City, US
- Other name: Bob Scheer
- Education: Christopher Columbus High School
- Alma mater: City College of New York; Maxwell School, Syracuse University; University of California, Berkeley
- Occupations: Journalist; author; columnist
- Years active: 1960s–present
- Employer: Los Angeles Times (1976–1993; 1993–2005) Truthdig (2005–2020) (Note: Co-founder of the site and Editor-in-Chief)
- Spouses: Narda Catharine Zacchino; Anne Butterfield Weills; Serena Turan Scheer
- Children: Christopher (b. 1968)

Robert Scheer (born April 4, 1936) is an American journalist and professor who has written for Ramparts, the Los Angeles Times, Playboy, Hustler Magazine, Truthdig, ScheerPost and other publications as well as having written many books. His column for Truthdig was nationally syndicated by Creators Syndicate in publications such as The Huffington Post and The Nation. He is a clinical professor of communications at the Annenberg School for Communication & Journalism at the University of Southern California. Scheer is the former editor in-chief for the Webby Award-winning online magazine Truthdig. Scheer’s work tends to embrace left-wing politics, and for many years, he co-hosted the nationally syndicated political analysis radio program Left, Right & Center on National Public Radio (NPR), produced at public radio station KCRW in Santa Monica. The Society of Professional Journalists awarded Scheer the 2011 Sigma Delta Chi Award for his column.

== Early life ==
Scheer was born and raised in the Bronx, New York City. His mother, Ida Kuran, was a Russian Jew, and his father, Frederick Scheer, was a Protestant native of Germany; both worked in the garment industry. Robert graduated from Christopher Columbus High School in the Bronx. After graduating from City College of New York with a degree in economics, he studied as a fellow at the Maxwell School of Syracuse University, and then did further economics graduate work at the Center for Chinese Studies at UC Berkeley. Scheer has also been a Poynter fellow at Yale University, and was a fellow in arms control at Stanford University.

== The Ramparts years ==
In 1962 in Berkeley, California, Scheer along with David Horowitz, Maurice Zeitlin, Phil Roos, and Sol Stern founded Root and Branch: A Radical Quarterly, one of the earliest campus New Left journals. Scheer was a member of the executive committee of the UC Berkeley branch of the Fair Play for Cuba Committee.

While working at City Lights Books in San Francisco, Scheer co-authored Cuba, an American Tragedy (1964) with Maurice Zeitlin. Between 1964 and 1969, he served, variously, as the Vietnam War correspondent, managing editor, and editor-in-chief of Ramparts magazine in San Francisco. Scheer reported from Cambodia, China, North Korea, Russia, Latin America and the Middle East (including the Six-Day War), as well as on national security matters in the United States. While in Cuba, where he interviewed Fidel Castro, Scheer obtained an introduction by the Cuban leader for the diary of Che Guevara — which Scheer had already obtained, with the help of French journalist Michele Ray, for publication in Ramparts and by Bantam Books. After Ramparts collapsed, Scheer became a freelance writer who was published in major magazines including Playboy, Look, Esquire, Lear's and Cosmopolitan.

== Congressional run ==
In the late 1960s, Scheer made a bid for elective office as an anti-Vietnam War candidate. He challenged U.S. Representative Jeffery Cohelan in the 1966 Democratic primary. Cohelan was a liberal, but like most Democratic officeholders at that time, he supported the Vietnam War. Mathematician Serge Lang served as Scheer's campaign treasurer. Scheer lost, but won over 45% of the vote (and carried Berkeley), a strong enough showing against an incumbent to represent an indicator of the strength of New Left Sixties radicalism. (Cohelan would lose re-nomination four years later to anti-war Berkeley City Councilman Ron Dellums.)

In 1968, Scheer signed the "Writers and Editors War Tax Protest" pledge, vowing to refuse to pay taxes in protest against the Vietnam War.

In July 1970, Scheer accompanied as a journalist a Black Panther Party delegation, led by Eldridge Cleaver, who also wrote for Ramparts, to North Korea, China, and Vietnam. The delegation also included people from the San Francisco Red Guard, the women's liberation movement, the Peace and Freedom Party, Newsreel, and the Movement for a Democratic Military.

In the November 1970 California elections, Scheer ran for the U.S. Senate as the nominee of the Peace and Freedom Party against Republican senator George Murphy and Democratic Congressman John V. Tunney. Scheer received 56,731 votes and lost the election to Tunney.

== Los Angeles Times and public radio ==
After several years freelancing for magazines, including New Times and Playboy, Scheer joined the Los Angeles Times in 1976 as a reporter. There he met Narda Zacchino, a reporter whom he later married in the paper's news room. As a national correspondent for 17 years at the LA Times, he wrote articles and series on diverse topics such as the Soviet Union during glasnost, the Jews of Los Angeles, arms control, urban crises, national politics and the military, and covered several presidential elections. The LA Times entered Scheer's work for the Pulitzer Prize 11 times, and he was a finalist for the Pulitzer national reporting award for a series on the television industry.

After Scheer left the LA Times in 1993, the paper granted him a weekly op-ed column which ran every Tuesday for the next 12 years until it was canceled in 2005. The column appeared in Truthdig and was distributed nationally by Creators Syndicate. Scheer is also a contributing editor for The Nation magazine. He was heard weekly on the nationally syndicated political analysis radio program Left, Right & Center, produced at and syndicated by public radio station KCRW in Santa Monica, and is a host of Scheer Intelligence, a half-hour KCRW podcast with politically engaged individuals. Scheer is now the publisher of ScheerPost, an independent, daily news website he founded with Zacchino in 2020.

Scheer has taught courses at Antioch College, City College of New York, UC Irvine, UCLA and UC Berkeley, and is now a clinical professor at the University of Southern California's Annenberg School for Communication, where he teaches two courses each semester on media and society.

Scheer interviewed every president from Richard Nixon through Bill Clinton. He conducted the 1976 Playboy interview with Jimmy Carter, in which the then-presidential candidate admitted to having "lusted" in his heart. In an interview with George H. W. Bush in 1980, the then presidential candidate revealed that he believed nuclear war was "winnable", which was believed to have contributed to his primary loss to Ronald Reagan.

Scheer has profiled politicians from Californians Jerry Brown and Willie Brown to Washington insiders like Henry Kissinger and Zbigniew Brzezinski. He has also reviewed films such as Oliver Stone's Born on the Fourth of July and interviewed actors and artists including Tom Cruise, Barbara Williams, Mike Farrell and Willie Nelson.

== Political views ==
=== Iraq War ===
In an August 6, 2002 article, he wrote that "a consensus of experts" informed the Senate that the Iraqi weapons arsenal was "almost totally destroyed during eight years of inspections." On June 3, 2003, Scheer concluded that White House justifications for the war were a "big lie." On November 4, 2003, he penned an article in favor of withdrawal from Iraq.

=== World War II ===
In an April 7, 2010 article, he wrote that Harry Truman perpetrated "the most atrocious act of terrorism in world history when he annihilated the civilian populations of Hiroshima and Nagasaki".

=== Russia and Ukraine ===
Scheer has accused tech companies of censoring articles that question the "NATO narrative" on the 2022 Russian invasion of Ukraine.

=== Support for Rand Paul ===
In 2010, Scheer expressed support for Republican Rand Paul, son of former Libertarian presidential candidate and Republican congressman Ron Paul, in his United States Senate campaign in Kentucky due to his anti-lobbying stance.

== End of Los Angeles Times relationship ==
Scheer has often expressed highly controversial ideas. In a February 15, 2005 LA Times article entitled "What We Don't Know About 9/11 Hurts Us", he stated: "Would George W. Bush have been reelected president if the public understood how much responsibility his administration bears for allowing the 9/11 attacks to succeed?" The Los Angeles Times ended their relationship with Scheer in November 2005, after his 12 years as a columnist and 17 prior years as a reporter. A short article in The Nation claimed Scheer was subsequently replaced with "two right-wing columnists, among others". Scheer, in an interview with Democracy Now!, alleged the paper's owner, the Tribune Company, owns a newspaper and a television station in the same market, which is illegal, and may have fired Scheer in an attempt to make it easier to obtain a waiver permitting the dual ownership from the Federal Communications Commission (FCC). He also commented:

What happened is that I had been the subject of vicious attacks by Bill O'Reilly and Rush Limbaugh. ... I was a punching bag for those guys. I'm still standing, and the people who run the paper collapsed.

In a posting on The Huffington Post, Scheer wrote:

The publisher Jeff Johnson, who has offered not a word of explanation to me, has privately told people that he hated every word that I wrote. I assume that mostly refers to my exposing the lies used by President Bush to justify the invasion of Iraq. Fortunately 60 percent of Americans now get the point but only after tens of thousand of Americans and Iraqis have been killed and maimed as the carnage spirals out of control. My only regret is that my pen was not sharper and my words tougher.

Scheer's firing incited a protest held outside the LA Times downtown office on November 15, and hundreds of readers wrote letters of complaint while some, including Barbra Streisand, publicly announced the cancellation of their LA Times subscriptions.

Within a few days of his column being retired by the Times, Scheer accepted an offer from the San Francisco Chronicle which went on to publish his column for three years.

== Truthdig ==
On November 29, 2005, Scheer co-launched, as editor in chief, the online news magazine, Truthdig. Scheer's column there was syndicated nationally by Creators Syndicate in publications such as The Huffington Post and The Nation. In a 2014 Los Angeles Magazine feature about Truthdig, Ed Leibowitz wrote:

The columnists and bloggers [of Truthdig] chart an ecosystem in irreversible decline, follow human rights crises and repression overseas, and probe the erosion of American democracy by perpetual war, the disappearance of privacy rights, the abandonment of the poor, and a political system in thrall to corporate titans, gross polluters, and Wall Street crooks. By pursuing these subjects with an intellectual rigor and relentlessness seldom found on the Web, Truthdig has become one of the most critically acclaimed Internet-based news sites in the world.

Among the site's most covered stories was an atheist manifesto by writer Sam Harris and a searing birthday tribute to slain U.S. Army Ranger and former NFL star Pat Tillman, written by his brother, Kevin.

Truthdig is a four-time recipient of the Webby Award for best political blog, and in 2013, Truthdig won a fifth award for best political site. Truthdig is a winner of multiple awards from the Society of Professional Journalists and the Los Angeles Press Club.

In March 2020, a dispute between Scheer and Truthdig's CEO and publisher, Zuade Kaufman, led to a work stoppage by employees who were subsequently fired. In November 2022, after almost two years on "hiatus", the website relaunched without Scheer's involvement. After leaving Truthdig, Scheer launched the website ScheerPost.

== Awards ==
Scheer received the 2010 Distinguished Work in New Media Award from the Society of Professional Journalists, and in 2011 Ithaca College named Scheer the winner of the Izzy Award for outstanding achievement in independent media.

Scheer was the 1998 honoree of the Shelter Partnership, an organization of Los Angeles downtown businesses as well as the recipient of the USC School of Social Work's Los Amigos Award. He won the James Aronson Award for Social Justice Journalism for his writing in the Los Angeles Times and The Nation about the case of nuclear scientist Wen Ho Lee. He has also received awards and citations from Stanford University, the Russian Academy of Sciences, the University of California, San Diego, and Yale University.

== Personal life ==
Scheer's first wife was Serena Turan Scheer. Serena, now the widow of poet Lou Embree, is the older sister of film critic Kenneth Turan. A Brooklyn native, she was on the editorial staff of Root and Branch and a reporter on the Oakland Tribune. Scheer and Turan divorced. Scheer married Anne Butterfield Weills in 1965. Their son Christopher Weills Scheer was born September 8, 1968. Scheer and Weills subsequently divorced.

Robert Scheer is now married to Narda Catharine Zacchino. She worked at the Los Angeles Times for 31 years, where she became the associate editor and a vice president. She was later deputy editor of the San Francisco Chronicle. Zacchino is the co-author of three books and is a senior fellow at USC's Annenberg Center on Communication Leadership and Policy.

== Books ==
Scheer's book, They Know Everything About You: How Data-Collecting Corporations and Snooping Government Agencies Are Destroying Democracy, was released on February 21, 2015. It was published by Nation Books, who also released Scheer's previous book The Great American Stickup: How Reagan Republicans and Clinton Democrats Enriched Wall Street While Mugging Main Street on September 7, 2010. Publishers Weekly wrote about the latter book saying that it "proves that, when it comes to the ruling sway of money power, Democrats and Republicans, Wall Street and Washington make very agreeable bedfellows." The book made the Los Angeles Times bestseller list and on October 17, 2010, was reviewed in the same paper by Jonathan Kirsch, who wrote

Robert Scheer is a journalist in the gadfly tradition of Lincoln Steffens, I. F. Stone and Seymour Hersh. His latest book, The Great American Stickup, blames the 'captains of finance' for causing the 2008 'meltdown' of the global economy in the first place and then profiting from the tax dollars that were thrown at the problem — 'a giant hustle that served the richest of the rich,' as he puts it, 'and left the rest of us holding the bag.'

Scheer has written eight other books, including a collection entitled Thinking Tuna Fish, Talking Death: Essays on the Pornography of Power; With Enough Shovels: Reagan, Bush and Nuclear War; and America After Nixon: The Age of Multinationals. In 2004, Scheer published The Five Biggest Lies Bush Told Us About Iraq, which became a Los Angeles Times Bestseller. It was co-authored by his oldest son, Christopher Scheer, and Lakshmi Chaudhry, senior editor at Alternet.

Scheer's anthology Playing President: My Close Encounters with Nixon, Carter, Bush I, Reagan and Clinton – and How They Did Not Prepare Me for George W. Bush (Akashic Books, 2006), is a collection of his many interviews, profiles, and columns about Presidents Richard Nixon through George W. Bush. The Pornography of Power: How Defense Hawks Hijacked 9/11 and Weakened America was published in 2008.

== Works ==
- Maurice Zeitlin, Robert Scheer, Cuba, Tragedy in our Hemisphere, Grove Press, 1963
- With Enough Shovels: Reagan, Bush, and Nuclear War, Random House Incorporated, 1983, ISBN 9780394722030
- Christopher Scheer, Robert Scheer, Lakshmi Chaudhry, The Five Biggest Lies Bush Told Us about Iraq, Akashic Books, Seven Stories Press, 2003, ISBN 9781583226445
- Playing President: My Close Ecounters with Nixon, Carter, Bush I, Reagan, and Clinton--and How They Did Not Prepare Me for George W. Bush. Truthdig. 1 May 2006. ISBN 978-1-933354-01-9.
- Scheer, Robert (2008). The Pornography of Power: How Defense Hawks Hijacked 9/11 and Weakened America.
- The Great American Stickup: How Reagan Republicans and Clinton Democrats Enriched Wall Street While Mugging Main Street. Nation Books. 2010. ISBN 978-1-56858-621-2.
- They Know Everything About You: How Data-Collecting Corporations and Snooping Government Agencies Are Destroying Democracy. Basic Books. 24 February 2015. ISBN 978-1-56858-453-9.

== Filmography ==
Scheer and his son were creative script consultants on the Oliver Stone film Nixon, which was nominated for an Academy Award for best original screenplay. In 2005, the Mill Valley Film Festival premiered a documentary he co-produced on the activist and philanthropist Stanley Sheinbaum.

In 1998, Scheer played a journalist in the 1998 feature film, The Siege and as a television pundit in the satirical political comedy Bulworth. In 2007, he was in the Argentinian film short colloquially entitled "La Vuelta del Perro."

== Discography ==
- A Night At Santa Rita, Narrated by Rosko; James Spaulding (flute); Ron Carter (bass); Nat Hentoff (commentary); Bob Thiele (producer); Victor Kalin (cover painting). (Flying Dutchman Productions)
