= Shearer =

A shearer is someone who shears, such as a cloth shearer, or a sheep shearer. Origins of the name include from near Bergen in Norway 1600s [Sweden of that period] as Skea (pronounced "Skeg" meaning "beard") and Heddle (meaning market place) as migrated to The Orkney Islands where the name 'Shearer' is found in Church marriage records of the time and as quite prolific for the overall population. Members of those family Shearer migrated to Australia and New Zealand in the 19th century and represents the highest concentration of nation for the name globally.

Additionally, shearers are some kind of mining machines used for continuous mining.

Additionally, Shearer is a surname:

== Surname ==
=== In sports ===
- Alan Shearer (born 1970), English footballer
- Andrew Shearer (lumber merchant) (1864–1944), Canadian lumber merchant and amateur ice hockey player
- Bob Shearer (1948–2022), Australian golfer and golf course architect
- Bob Shearer (footballer) (1892–1957), Australian rules footballer
- Bobby Shearer (1931–2006), Scottish footballer
- Brad Shearer (born 1955), American football player
- Dale Shearer (born 1965), Australian rugby league player
- Dale Shearer (racing driver) (born 1959), American stock car racing driver
- Dave Shearer (1958–2022), Scottish footballer
- Donald Shearer (1909–1999), English amateur footballer and cricketer
- Duncan Shearer (born 1962), Scottish footballer
- Graeme Shearer (1948–1983), Australian rules footballer
- Jack Shearer (1896–1963), New Zealand rugby union player
- Jan Shearer (born 1958), New Zealand sailor
- Jock Shearer (1917–1979), Scottish football player and coach
- Lee Shearer (born 1977), English footballer
- Marshall L. Shearer (1901–1964), American football coach
- Matt Shearer (born 1973), Canadian lacrosse player
- Peter Shearer (born 1967), English footballer
- Ray Shearer (1929–1982), American baseball player
- Ray Shearer (footballer) (1924–1975), Australian rules footballer
- Rob Shearer (born 1976), Canadian ice hockey player
- Ronald Shearer (1905–1998), American football player
- Sam Shearer (1883–1971), Scottish footballer
- Scott Shearer (born 1981), Scottish footballer
- Sydney Shearer (1890–1973), New Zealand rugby union player
- Wally Shearer (1918–2000), Australian rules footballer

=== In politics and religion ===
- Bill Shearer (1931–2007), American attorney and political activist who founded the American Independent Party
- Conrad Shearer (1873–1948), American politician and businessman
- David Shearer (born 1957), New Zealand Leader of the Opposition and UN Deputy Special Representative to Iraq
- David Shearer (minister) (1832–1891), founder of the Presbyterian Church in Western Australia
- Hugh Shearer (1923–2004), Jamaican Prime Minister
- Ian Shearer (1941–2021), New Zealand, National Party politician
- Jack Shearer (priest) (1926–2001), Church of Ireland priest and Dean of Belfast cathedral
- Mark Shearer (born 1962), American politician
- Robert Austin Shearer (1868–1920), Ontario farmer and political figure
- Tony Shearer (1926–2002), American Mayanism proponent and New Age author
- Vernon Shearer, South African politician

=== In the arts ===
- Aaron Shearer (1919–2008), American classical guitarist and teacher
- Al Shearer (born 1977), American actor
- Allen Shearer (born 1943), American composer and baritone
- Andrew N. Shearer (born 1977), American filmmaker, journalist and punk rock musician
- Ariel Shearer (c. 1905-?), Australian concert pianist
- Athole Shearer (1900–1985), Canadian actress
- Barbara Shearer (1936–2005), American pianist
- Ben Shearer (born 1941), South Australian artist noted for outback watercolours
- Brandi Shearer (born 1980), American singer-songwriter
- Christopher Shearer (1846–1926), American landscape artist
- Dick Shearer (1940–1997), American jazz trombonist
- Harry Shearer (born 1943), American actor and comedian
- Jill Shearer (1936–2012), Australian playwright
- John Shearer (photographer, born 1947) (1947–2019), American photographer
- John D. Shearer (born 1980), American photographer
- Moira Shearer (1926–2006), Scottish actress and ballet dancer
- Norma Shearer (1902–1983), Canadian-American actress, sister of Athole
- Rhonda Roland Shearer, American sculptor and art historian
- Steven Shearer (born 1968), Canadian multimedia artist
- Sybil Shearer (1912–2005), Canadian modern dancer, writer, choreographer
- Ted Shearer (1919–1992), American advertising art director and cartoonist

=== Others ===
- Alex Shearer (born 1949), British novelist and scriptwriter
- Andrew Shearer (astrophysicist) (born 1953), Irish astrophysicist
- Blake Shearer (2002–2018), American murder victim
- Brooke Shearer (1950–2009), American private investigator, journalist and political aide
- Catriona Shearer, Scottish broadcast journalist and producer
- Charles L. Shearer (born 1942), American academic and university president
- Clea Shearer, American entrepreneur
- Cresswell Shearer (1874–1941), British zoologist
- David Shearer (engineer) (1850–1936), Australian inventor, agricultural implement manufacturer and steam car pioneer
- Derek Shearer (born 1946), American diplomat
- Douglas Shearer (1899–1971), Canadian-American motion picture sound engineer
- Elga Meta Shearer (1883–1967), American educator and textbook author
- Ernest Shearer (1879–1945) Scottish agriculturalist
- Gene Shearer (born 1937), American immunologist
- Hannah Louise Shearer (born 1945), American television writer
- Helena Shearer (c. 1842–1885), Irish socialist and suffragist
- David Shearer (engineer) (1850–1936), Australian inventor, agricultural implement manufacturer and steam car pioneer
- Ian Shearer, Lord Avonside (1914–1996), Scottish lawyer and judge
- John Shearer & Sons Australian farm machinery manufacturer
- Thomas Shearer, 18th-century English furniture designer
- Jacqueline Shearer (1946–1993), American documentary director and producer
- James Shearer (1881–1962) Scottish architect
- Jesse Lowen Shearer (1921–1992), American engineer
- Jim Shearer (born 1974), American television personality
- John Bunyan Shearer (1832–1919), American college president
- John Shearer (engineer) (1845–1932), Australian inventor and agricultural implement manufacturer
- Jonathan Shearer (born 1965), British media personality
- Lloyd Shearer (1916–2001), American celebrity gossip columnist
- Maurice E. Shearer (1879–1953), United States Marine Corps general
- Miranda Shearer (born 1982), English writer
- Sallie Shearer (c. 1848–1909), American brothel-keeper and wife of Christopher Shearer
- William Shearer (British Free Corps) (1917–1995), British Nazi collaborator
- William Shearer (immunologist) (1937–2018), American immunologist

== Given name ==
- Shearer West, British-American art-historian, academic and university administrator

== See also ==
- Other surnames:
  - Scherer
  - Sheerer
  - Sharer
  - Sherer
- Shear (disambiguation)
