= Scherer =

Scherer or Scherrer is a German language surname widespread in German speaking Europe since the Middle Ages. With the beginning of colonization it also came to North and South America. Notable people with the surname include:

== Scherer ==
- Alfredo Scherer (1903–1996), Brazilian Roman Catholic prelate
- Andreas Scherer, German ski jumper
- Axel Scherer (professor), American physicist
- Barthélemy Louis Joseph Schérer (1747–1804), French general during the French Revolution
- Bee Scherer (born 1971 as Burkhard Scherer), English professor of Buddhist studies and former professor of gender studies and religious studies
- Bernie Scherer (1913–2004), American football player
- Dave Scherer, American sports writer and journalist
- Edmond Henri Adolphe Schérer (1815–1889), French politician
- Elizabeth Scherer (born 1976/77), American judge
- Emanuel Scherer (1901–1977), Polish-Jewish politician
- Fernando Scherer (born 1974), Brazilian swimmer
- Frederic M. Scherer (born 1932), American economist
- Gabriela Scherer (born 1981), Swiss mezzosoprano
- Georg Scherer (1540–1605), Roman Catholic pulpit orator and controversialist
- Giorgio Scherer (1831–1896), Italian painter, mainly of genre paintings
- Gordon H. Scherer (1906–1988), American politician
- Hermann Scherer (1893–1927), German-speaking Swiss Expressionist
- Irineu Roque Scherer (1950–2016), Roman Catholic bishop
- James A. B. Scherer (1870–1944), American educator and Lutheran minister
- Jean Marie Maurice Schérer, better known as Éric Rohmer, French film director, film critic, journalist, novelist, screenwriter, and teacher
- Johann Andreas Scherer (1755–1844), Austrian chemist and botanist
- Johann Jakob Scherer (1825–1878), Swiss politician for the Free Democratic Party of Switzerland
- Johann Joseph Scherer (1814–1869), German chemist
- John Scherer (athlete) (born 1966), American long-distance runner for the Michigan Wolverines
- Josh Scherer (born 1992), American chef and internet personality
- Julio Scherer García (1926–2015), Mexican author and journalist
- Klaus Scherer (born 1943), Swiss psychologist
- Lee R. Scherer (1919–2011), American aeronautical engineer, director of NASA's John F. Kennedy Space Center from 1975 to 1979
- Leopoldo García-Colín Scherer (1930–2012), Mexican scientist specialized in thermodynamics
- Lucy Scherer (born 1981), German actress
- Luther B. Scherer, also known as Tutor Scherer, (1879–1957), American casino investor in Las Vegas, Nevada
- Maria Katherina Scherer, (1825–1888), Swiss Roman Catholic professed religious and the co-founder of the Sisters of Mercy of the Holy Cross
- Marie-Luise Scherer (1938–2022), German author and journalist
- Markus Scherer (born 1962), German wrestler
- Martin Scherer (born 1972), German physician
- Michael Scherer (American football) (born 1993), American football player and coach
- Michelle Scherer, American environmental geochemist
- Odilo Scherer (born 1949), Brazilian Brazilian Roman Catholic prelate
- Péter Scherer (1961–2026), Hungarian stage and film actor
- René Schérer (1922–2023), French philosopher
- Rip Scherer (born 1952), American coach
- Robert Pauli Scherer (1906–1960), American inventor
- Roger H. Scherer (1935–2022), American lawyer and politician
- Rodolphe Scherer (born 1972), French equestrian
- Roy Scherer Jr., better known as Rock Hudson, American actor
- Sarah Scherer (born 1991), American sports shooter
- Sebastian Anton Scherer (1631–1712), German composer and organist of the Baroque era
- Siegfried Scherer (born 1955), German biologist
- Sophie Ritter von Scherer (1817–1876), Austrian writer
- Stephen Scherer (1989–2010), Cadet with the class of 2011 at the United States Military Academy who competed in the 2008 Olympic Games in 10 metre air rifle
- Stephen W. Scherer (born 1964), Canadian scientist
- Susan Scherer (born 1956), played for the Canadian National women's ice hockey team from 1989 to 1992
- Theodor Scherer (1889–1951), German general during both World Wars, received the Knight's Cross of the Iron Cross
- Wilhelm Scherer (1841–1886), German philologist

== Scherrer ==
- Albert Scherrer (1908–1986), Swiss racing driver
- Bill Scherrer (born 1958), American baseball player
- Chiara Scherrer (born 1996), Swiss steeplechase runner
- Dominik Scherrer, Swiss-born British film, theatre and television composer
- Eduard Scherrer (1890–1972), Swiss bobsledder
- Jean-Louis Scherrer (1935–2013), French fashion designer
- Hélène Scherrer (born 1950), Canadian politician
- Paul Scherrer (1890–1969), Swiss physicist
- Tom Scherrer (born 1970), American golfer

== Places ==
- Schererville, Indiana
- Scherersville, Pennsylvania

== Businesses ==
- Plant Scherer, a coal-fired power plant in Juliette, Georgia
- Riker, Danzig, Scherer, Hyland & Perretti, American law firm
- Shannon & Scherer, architectural firm
- Paul Scherrer Institute

== See also ==
- Shearer (disambiguation)
