= Sallie Shearer =

American brothel-owner

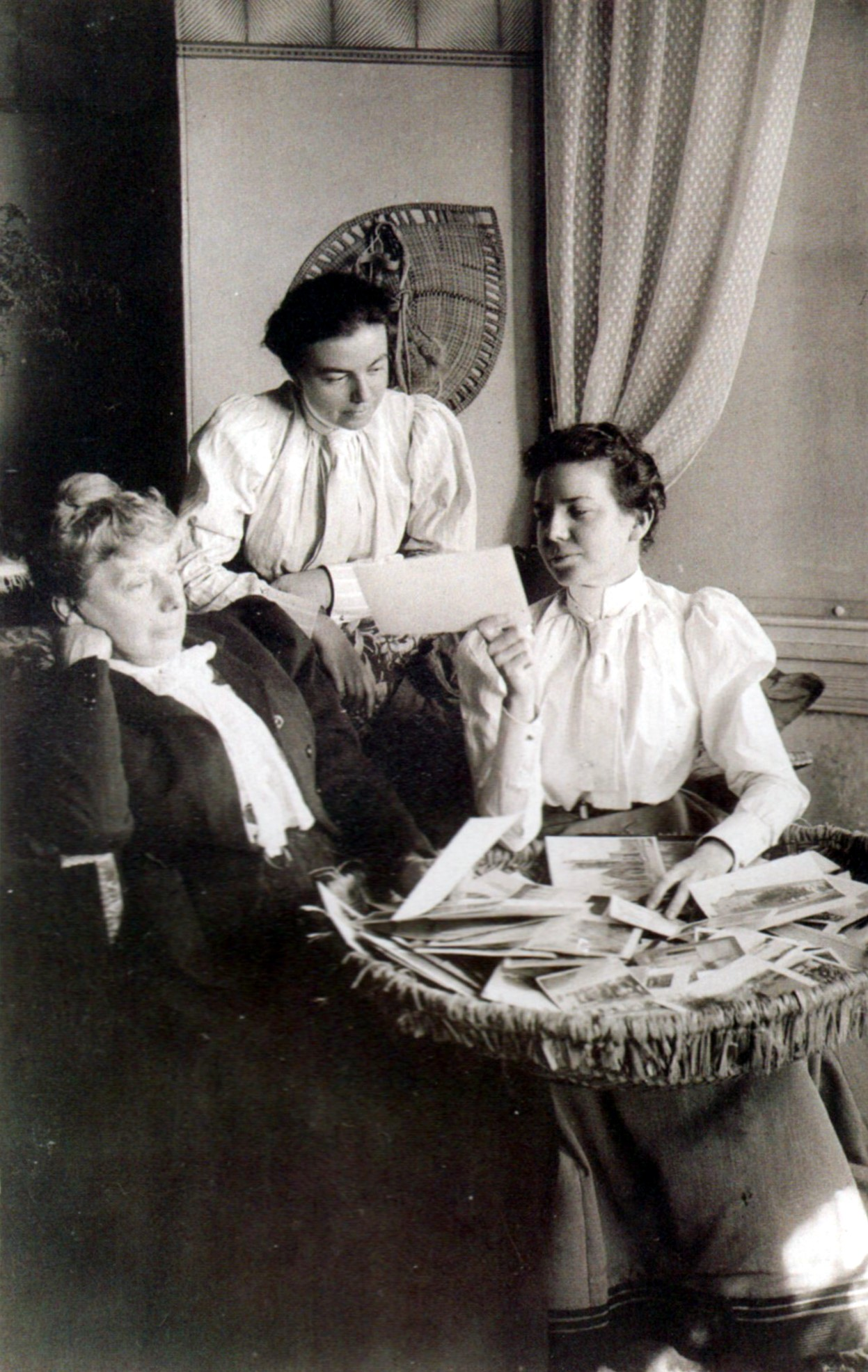
- The woman on the left is thought to be Sallie Shearer. Photograph by William Goldman, c. 1892.
- Born: Sarah D. Fisher c. 1848; Muhlenberg Township, Berks County, Pennsylvania
- Died: 1 October 1909; Reading, Pennsylvania
- Occupation: Brothel keeper
- Spouse: Christopher Shearer

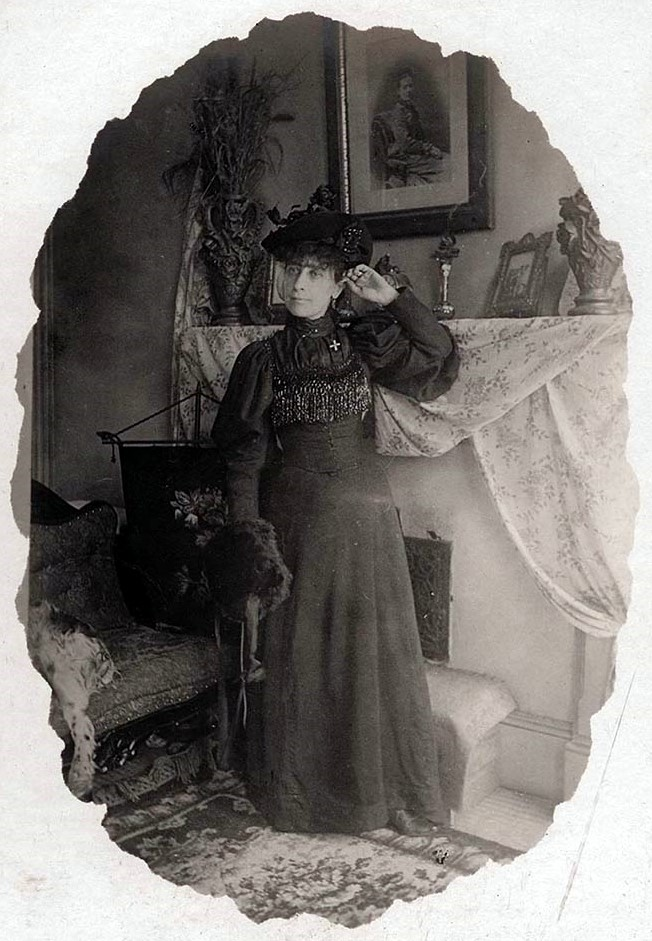
One of Shearer's "girls"

Sarah D. Shearer (née Fisher; c. 1848 – 1 October 1909) was an American brothel-keeper in Reading, Pennsylvania. She married the artist Christopher Shearer who abandoned her and their sons to study in Europe, and whom she subsequently divorced. In 1880 she was working as a dressmaker but by 1883 she was working in the sex business and eventually opened a high-class "parlor house" (brothel) of her own.

Despite frequent brushes with the law and serving at least one jail sentence, she was financially successful and able to buy property and keep a fancy carriage. In the 1890s, the women of her house were the subjects of a secret collection of photographs made by local photographer William Goldman that was published in book form in 2018. She died of diabetes and was buried in a lavish casket at the Lutheran cemetery in Reading.

== Early life and family ==
Sarah Fisher was born in 1848, in Muhlenberg Township in Berks County, Pennsylvania.

She married the landscape painter Christopher Shearer (1846–1926) who abandoned her and their sons Victor and Bernard to study in Europe and whom she subsequently divorced.

== Career ==
In 1880, Shearer was listed as a dressmaker in a Reading city directory. She subsequently entered the world of prostitution. It is not known if she worked as a prostitute herself, but by 1883 she ran a "ranche" (brothel) on Washington Street, between Third and Fourth. By the 1890s she was the owner of one of Reading's most upmarket brothels, a "parlor house" on the corner of North 8th and Walnut streets, so called because men were entertained in the parlor while choosing from the women of the house. It was described by a police officer as "magnificently furnished. The finest velvet carpets cover the floors, beautiful mirrors adorn the walls and the rooms are beautifully decorated".

Her profession often brought her into conflict with the forces of law and order and she regularly appeared in the Reading newspapers for criminal matters, often when local politicians were running for office with promises to clamp down on vice. In 1883 her establishment in Washington Street was raided by the police after causing a nuisance to the neighbours. Shearer was arrested along with Mina B. Heller and Emma Heckman. Also arrested were a group of men and one woman who, Shearer alleged, had broken in and stolen from her.

Some thought they could extort money from her. In 1890 she appeared in court in connection with a case in which it was alleged that she had been threatened with prosecution if she did not pay a member of the Fehr family a bribe. She did not pay and was prosecuted for running a disorderly house and for selling alcohol without a licence, which charges she settled by paying $203. Shearer stated that she did not instigate the case and it originated in a separate prosecution by the Commonwealth of Pennsylvania of John L. Fehr for extortion.

In 1898, she was one of those charged with "keeping bawdy houses and selling Liquor without a licence and on Sunday" as part of a "crusade against disreputable houses". Also arrested were Lizzie Hamilton of 942 Buttonwood, Flo Wilson of 1021 Walnut, and Harry Weaver who ran an establishment of black women known as "Mahogany Hall". Shearer pleaded guilty and was sentenced to a $100 fine and three months imprisonment and "was at once taken to prison". She was released in March 1899 after serving the full term and left with Carrie Kalbach who had been convicted of the same offence.

Despite these brushes with the law, Shearer prospered and was able to buy a house for her sons and a black carriage with tassels and Belgian lace curtains.

In the early 1890s, the women in her brothel were the subjects of a secret collection of photographs made by William Goldman that was discovered by the historian of photography Robert Flynn Johnson around 2010 in the stock of a postcard dealer in Concord, California. The collection was published by Glitterati Editions in 2018.

== Later life ==
In 1907 it was revealed in proceedings against the alleged brothel-keeper May Reilly for illegally selling liquor on a Sunday, that Shearer had leased her house on Eighth and Walnut Streets to Reilly for five years from May 1905, possibly indicating a reduction in activities. Agents of the Law and Order Society of Philadelphia testified that they had bought liquor from her and Shearer on that day and in that place on multiple occasions in 1906.

Shearer died of diabetes on 1 October 1909 at her home at 1138 North Eleventh Street after being ill for several years. She was buried at Alsace Lutheran Church Cemetery in Reading, her remains "attired in a cream silk robe and lay in a purple cloth covered couch casket with extension bar handles, silver trimmings and plate bearing name and age".
