= Gibboney =

Gibboney is a surname. Notable people with the surname include:

- David Clarence Gibboney (1868-1920), secretary of the Law and Order Society in Philadelphia
- Linda Gibboney (born 1951), American actress
