= David Shearer (disambiguation) =

David Shearer (born 1957) is a New Zealand politician and former United Nations worker.

David Shearer or Dave Shearer may also refer to:

- David Shearer (minister) (1832–1891), Scottish-born Presbyterian minister in England and Western Australia
- David Shearer (engineer) (1850–1936), Australian mechanical engineer
- Dave Shearer (born 1958), Scottish association footballer
