= John Shearer =

John Shearer may refer to:

- John Shearer & Sons, Australian farm machinery manufacturer
- John Bunyan Shearer (1832–1919), president of Davidson College
- Jock Shearer (1917–1979), Scottish professional footballer
- Jack Shearer (priest) (1926–2001), Church of Ireland Dean of Belfast
- John Shearer (photographer, born 1947) (1947–2019), American photographer
- John D. Shearer (born 1980), American photographer
- John Shearer (photographer, born 1981), American photographer

== See also ==
- John Shearer Fletcher (1888–1934), New Zealand politician
