= Julio Scherer García =

Mexican author and journalist (1926–2015)

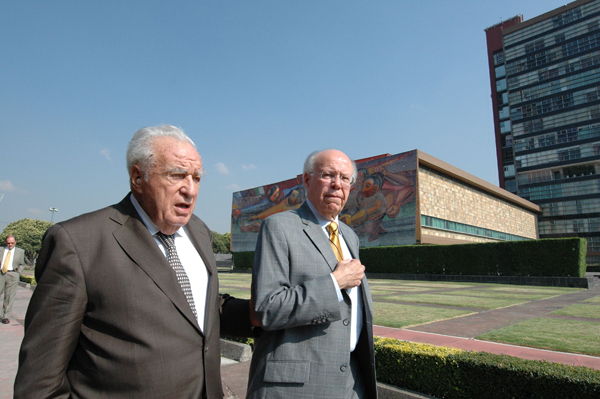
- Scherer walking with José Narro, rector of UNAM, in 2011.
- Born: 7 April 1926; Mexico City, Mexico
- Died: 7 January 2015 (aged 88); Mexico City, Mexico
- Occupations: Journalist and editor
- Years active: 1947–2015
- Children: Julio Scherer Ibarra

Julio Scherer García (Note: In this Spanish name, the first or paternal surname is Scherer and the second or maternal family name is García.) (7 April 1926 – 7 January 2015) was a Mexican author and journalist. He was the editor of the daily newspaper Excélsior from 1968 to 1976. He also was the founder of the newsmagazine Proceso.

Scherer wrote dozens of articles on corruption and abuse of power within the Mexican government. As so he was able to have an interview with the "mysterious", "invisible" and "intangible" most wanted drugs lord Ismael Zambada in 2010.

== Personal life ==
Scherer was born in Mexico City on 7 April 1926.

He died of septic shock at the age of 88. The news of his death was reported on the website of Proceso.

His son Julio Scherer Ibarra who is an attorney, writer and politician served in 2018 as Legal Counsel of the Federal Executive under President Andrés Manuel López Obrador.

== Awards and recognition ==
In 1971 Scherer received the Maria Moors Cabot Prize from Columbia University for his contributions to upholding freedom of the press in Mexico. He was also awarded the Atlas World Review Journalist of the Year Prize in 1977, the Manuel Buendia Prize by the Michoacan state congress in 1986. In 2002, Scherer was awarded the CEMEX-FNPI New Journalism Prize, promoted by writer Gabriel García Márquez. In 1986, a group of thirteen Mexican universities awarded him for his journalistic career. He also received the Roque Dalton recognition for his journalist work in 2001.

Scherer received Honorary doctorates by the University of Guadalajara (2005) and from the Benito Juárez Autonomous University of Oaxaca (March 2014).

In 1988 he rejected the National Journalism Prize of Mexico, who was awarded by the President of Mexico and heavily politicized. He accepted the award when he won it again in 2002.

== Books ==
- Siqueiros: La piel y la entraña (1965)
- Los presidentes (1986)
- Salinas y su imperio
- El poder: historias de familia (1990)
- Estos años (1995)
- Cárceles (1998)
- Parte de guerra, co-authored with Carlos Monsiváis (1999)
- La pareja (2005)
- La terca memoria (2007)
- El indio que mató al padre Pro
- La reina del pacífico (2008)
- Allende en llamas (2008)
- Secuestrados (2009)
- Historias de muerte y corrupción (2011)
- Calderón de cuerpo entero (2012)
- Vivir (2012)
- Máxima seguridad
