= Sharer =

Sharer is a surname. Notable people with the surname include:

- Kevin W. Sharer (born 1948), American businessman
- Robert Sharer (1940–2012), American archaeologist, academic and Mayanist researcher
- Shanda Sharer (1979–1992), American murder victim
- William Sharer (born 1959), American politician

== See also ==
- Shearer, another surname
- Sheerer, another surname
