= William Goldman (photographer) =

American photographer (1856–1922)

William I. Goldman
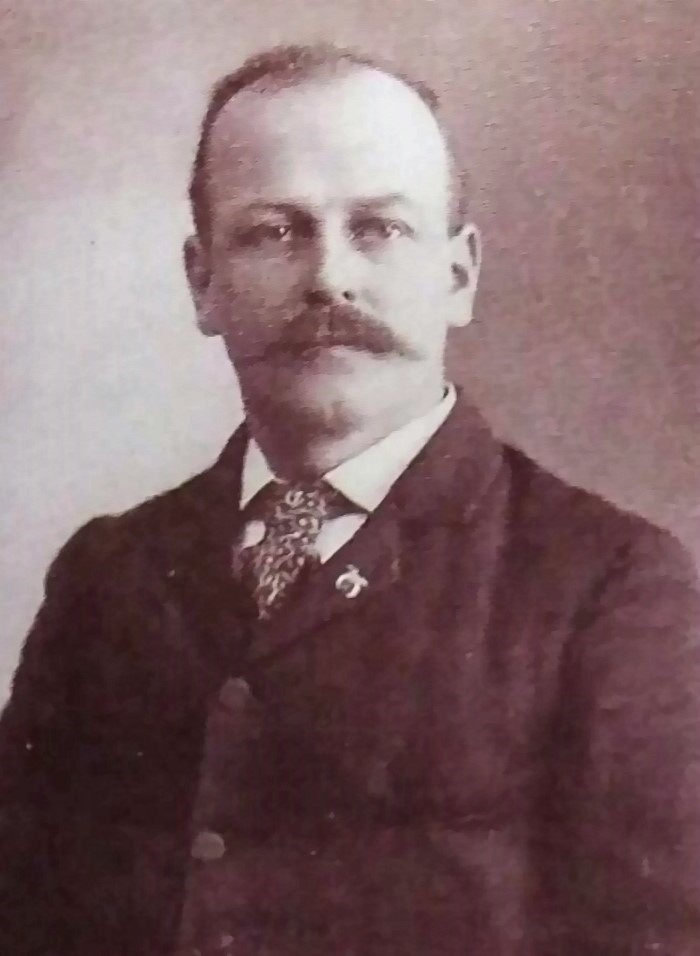
- William I. Goldman
- Born: March 27, 1856; Wernersville, Pennsylvania, US
- Died: January 25, 1922 (aged 65)
- Resting place: Charles Evans Cemetery
- Occupation: Photographer
- Known for: Photographs of Reading's prostitutes

William I. Goldman (March 27, 1856 – January 25, 1922) was an American commercial photographer based in Reading, Pennsylvania. A freemason and pillar of the community, Goldman photographed the citizens of Reading but also secretly assembled a collection of photographs of the prostitutes of Sallie Shearer's brothel, which was near his studio.

His brothel photographs were apparently known only to Goldman and his subjects and, as far as is known, were not sold or published during his lifetime. They were mounted in albums where they remained until the early 21st century when they were acquired by Robert Flynn Johnson, a historian of photography, who published them in 2018. They have been described as offering insights into the costume and interior decoration of the period as well as the social conditions of working-class women for some of whom prostitution was seen as preferable to poorly-paid factory or shop work where they often faced demands for sex from their superiors.

== Early life and family ==
William Goldman was born in Wernersville, Pennsylvania, on March 27, 1856 to parents also from Pennsylvania. He was educated in Reading. He had at least three brothers who outlived him. He never married.

== Career ==
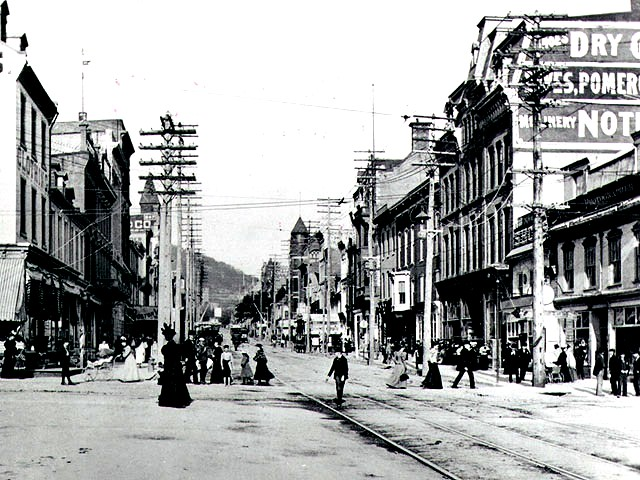
Penn Street, Reading c.1890.

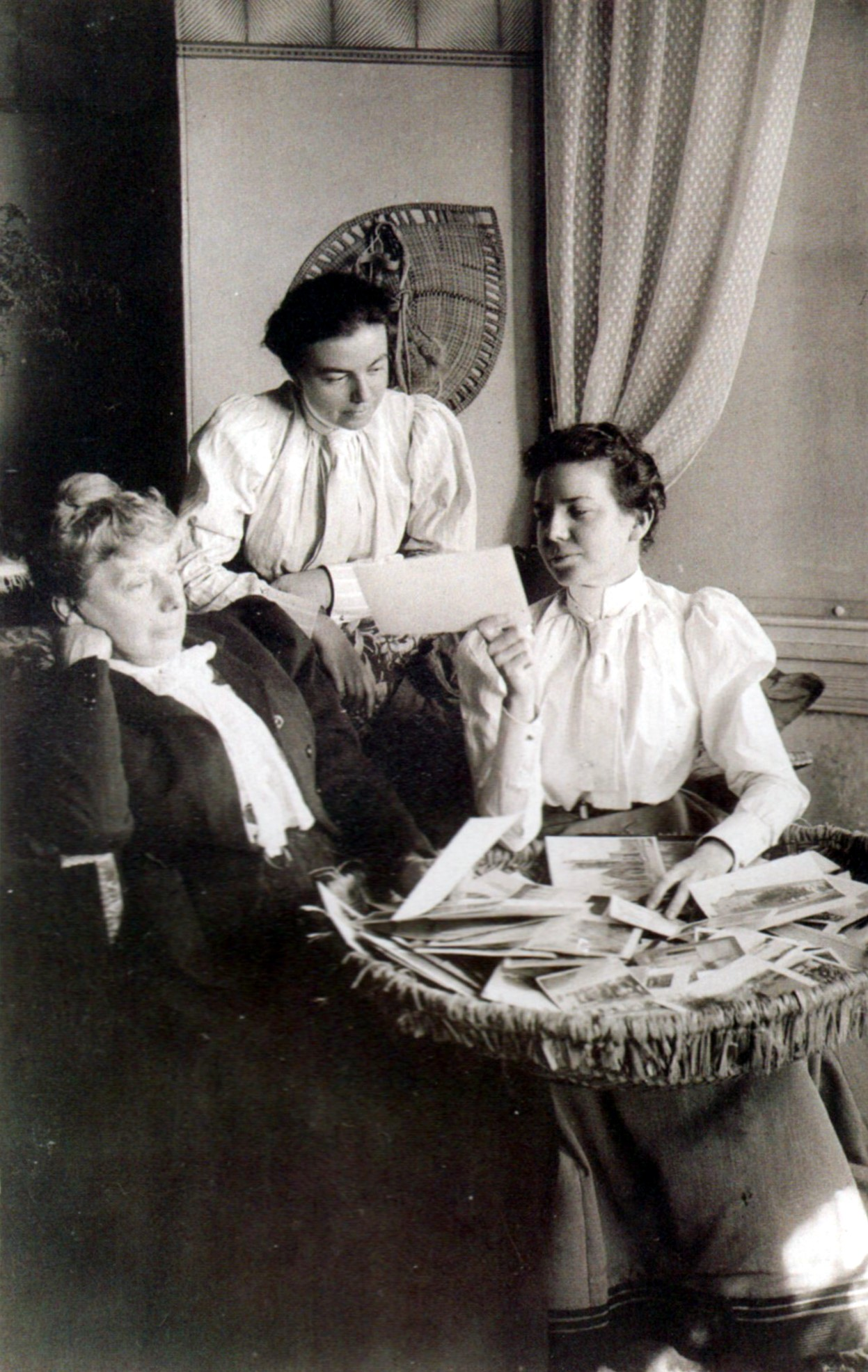
The woman on the left is thought to be Sallie Shearer, owner of the brothel on the corner of North 8th and Walnut streets in Reading. William Goldman, c.1892.

In 1876, Goldman entered the photographic profession working for E. E. Hafer. After learning the business for 15 years, he opened his own studio in 1891 at 602 Penn Street, Reading. He built a successful business using the reputation and training he had acquired with Hafer and made a specialism of carbonettes when they were introduced. He became treasurer of the State Photographers' Association.

Contemporary sources describe him as "an exceedingly popular gentleman ... identified with numerous of the city's secret and social organizations," including Reading Lodge No. 549, Reading Chapter No. 152, DeMolay Commandery No. 9, Harrisburg Consistory, Rajah Temple, Elks Lodge No. 115, and Emblematic Lodge No. 169.

== Secret collection ==
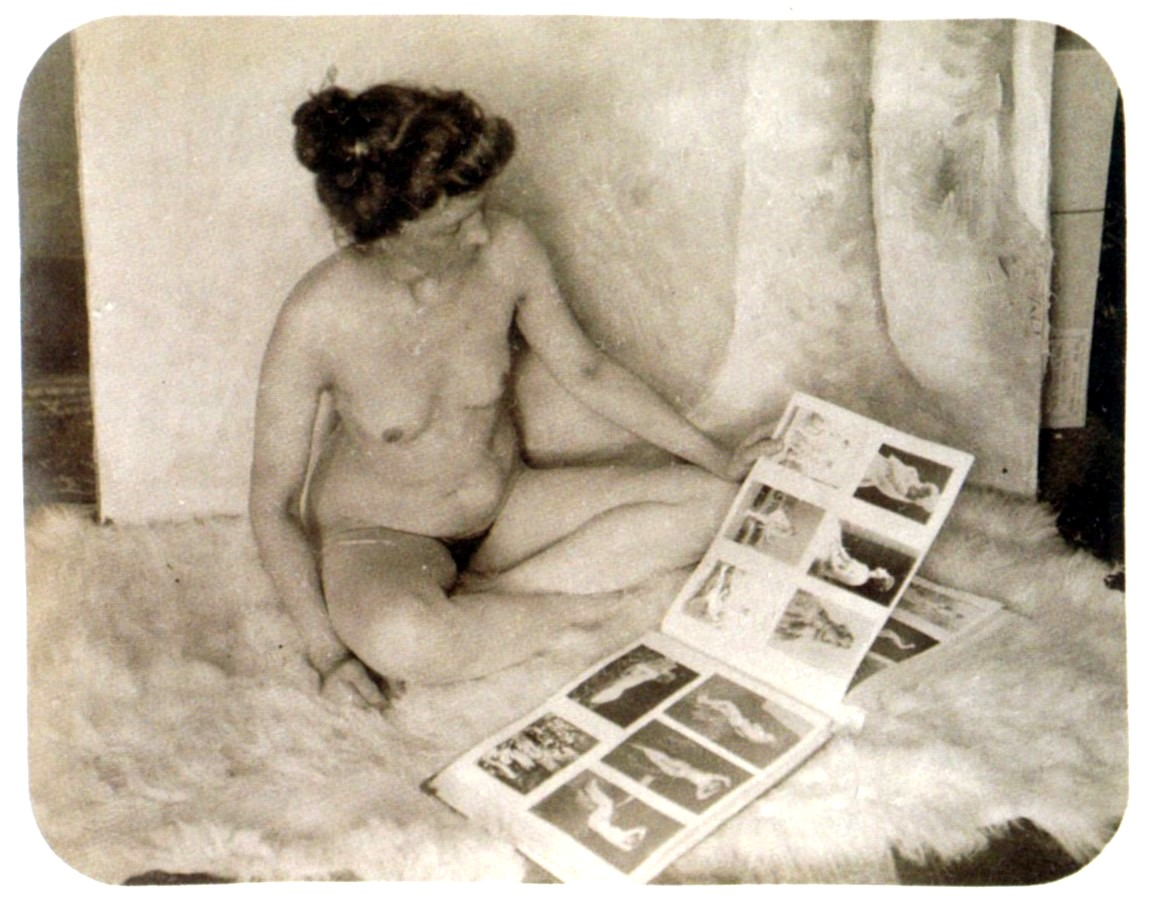
Woman inspecting an album of photographs, by Goldman, c. 1892

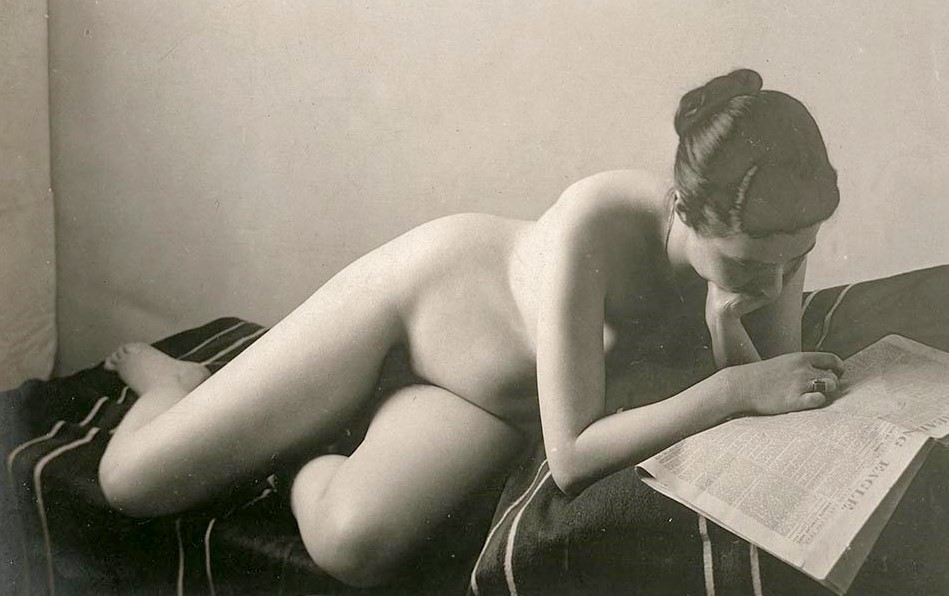
Woman reading the Reading Eagle, of August 14, 1892, a photograph that enabled Robert Flynn Johnson to identify the source of the collection

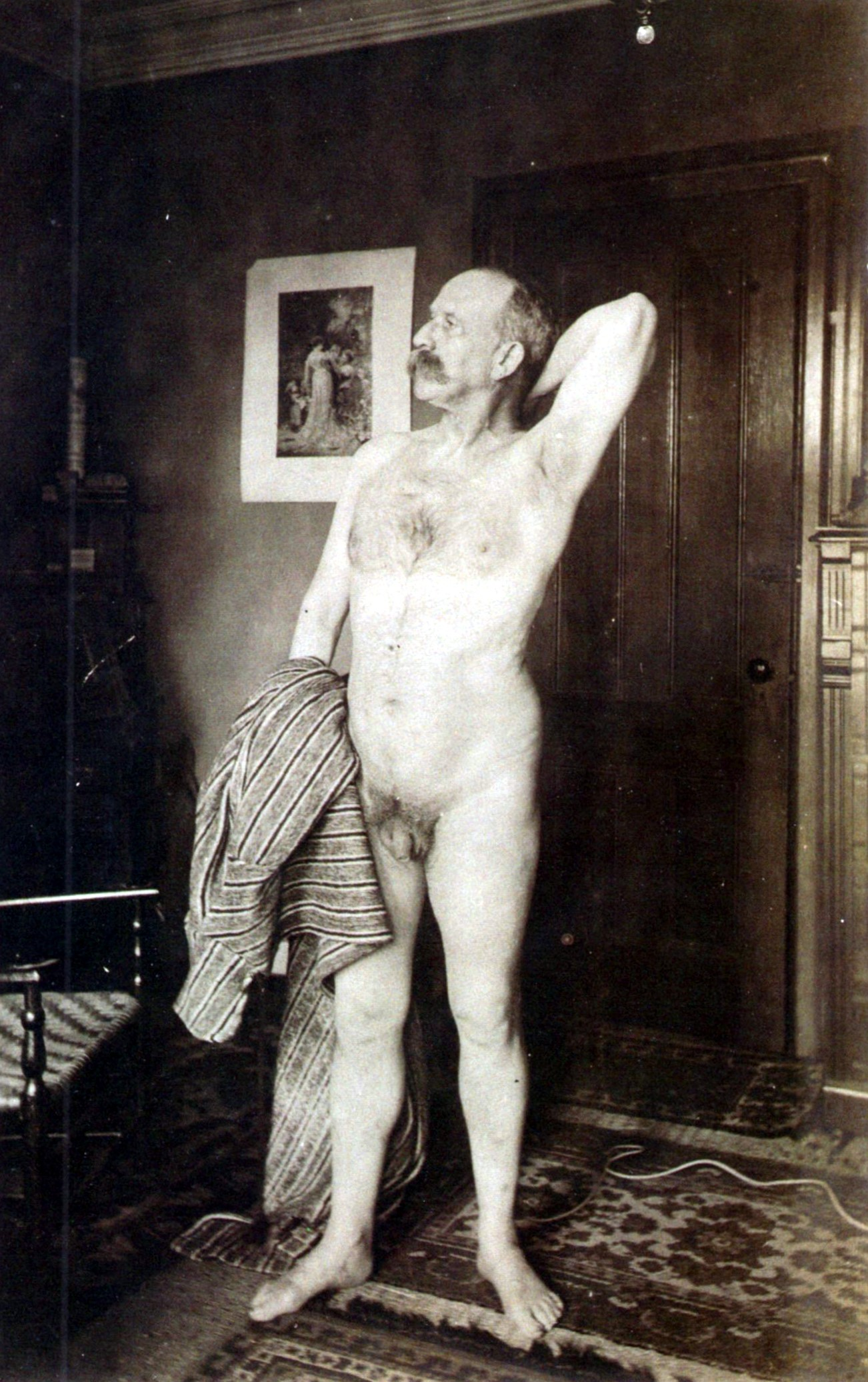
William I. Goldman in a possible self-portrait, n.d.

At the same time as photographing the respectable citizens of Reading, Goldman also secretly assembled a collection of mostly nude and semi-nude photographs of the prostitutes at Sallie Shearer's brothel on the corner of North 8th and Walnut streets in Reading, only a ten-minute walk from his studio on Penn Street. There were at least two other brothels on Walnut street: Flo Wilson's at 1021 and Effie Brownwell's at 1021 1/2.

Reading was a fast-expanding city in the late 19th century, its growth spurred by the arrival of the railway that brought workers and businessmen in and with a hierarchy of places where sex could be purchased. At the bottom end were the streetwalkers who congregated at the railway station or saloons and transacted business wherever they could, and at the top were the higher class "parlor houses" like Shearer's for those who could afford them; so-called because men were entertained in the parlour on arrival while they chose from the women of the house. Brothels were euphemistically known as "resorts" or "ranches" by the press and the women who worked in them as "inmates." In 1898, during one of her regular brushes with the law, Shearer's establishment was described by a police officer as "magnificently furnished. The finest velvet carpets cover the floors, beautiful mirrors adorn the walls and the rooms are beautifully decorated."

Goldman's collection, which has been compared to that of E. J. Bellocq in New Orleans, was found by Robert Flynn Johnson around 2010 in the stock of a postcard dealer at a fair in Concord, California. He initially bought only two photographs before visiting the dealer at her home in the Sierra Foothills and gradually purchasing the rest of the collection. The dealer told him that the photographs had been bought by her late husband at a gun show in Cincinnati, Ohio, and had originally been mounted in albums from which they had been removed. Johnson was able to place and approximately date the photographs because one showed a woman reading a copy of the Reading Eagle dated August 14, 1892. Others showed women inspecting the photographs in the original albums. After research in Reading and consulting local historians, Johnson was able to identify Goldman as the photographer.

As well as many nude and semi-nude images of Shearer's employees, the collection also includes images of the women carrying out daily activities, a set of nudes of a man in athletic and action poses who is described as a customer, three images of a black woman, a pregnant woman, and a nude photograph of Goldman that may be a self-portrait. There are many dual portraits of women but only one mixed-sex image and none of the images show sexual activity. Only two of the images are set outdoors. With one exception, the women are all white, there being separate houses employing black women such as Harry Weaver's "Mahogany Hall" at 729 North Twelfth.

While some of the pictures appear to have been taken at Shearer's house, others include props, sets, and costumes characteristic of a professional photographic studio such as the set of images showing a crescent moon and others in which women are shown draped like Greek goddesses or praying. Johnson searched archives in Pennsylvania and found no evidence that the images were distributed, nor does he believe that they were used as a catalogue for male customers as the high turnover of women in an establishment like Shearer's made that impractical. It is notable throughout how relaxed the women are in front of the camera, indicating that they were in the presence of someone they trusted, although some hide their faces.

The images have been described as offering insights into fashion and interior decoration towards the end of the nineteenth century. Dennita Sewell has commented on the elaborate variety of undergarments on show such as stockings, petticoats, and corsets, the removal of which was part of a striptease performed for the camera and the customer but which, while typical of those worn by respectable middle-class women of the period, were far more expensive than working-class women could normally afford.

The photographs also suggest that Goldman was aware of contemporary social debates such as in the image of a nude, and possibly pregnant, woman resting her hand on John Cowan's book The Science of a New Life (1869), in which Cowan argued that women should have control over their own fertility and equal rights to men. Goldman's interest in the nude female form, which was difficult for him to photograph using the "respectable" women of his time as models, is obvious, as is the risk of scandal and ruin had his collection become widely known in Victorian Reading.

== Gallery ==
Photographs from the Goldman collection, all c.1892 and subjects unidentified.

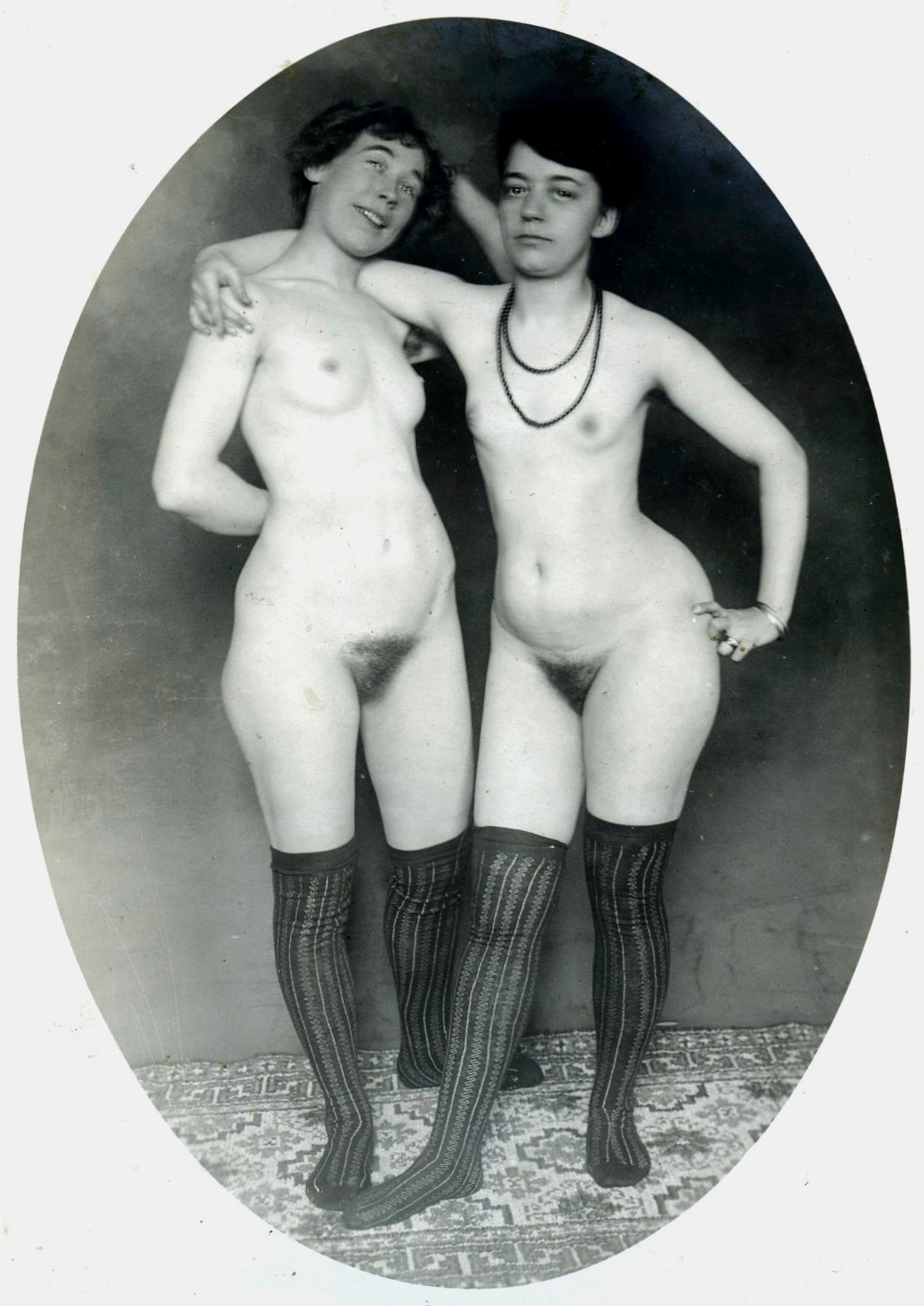
Two women

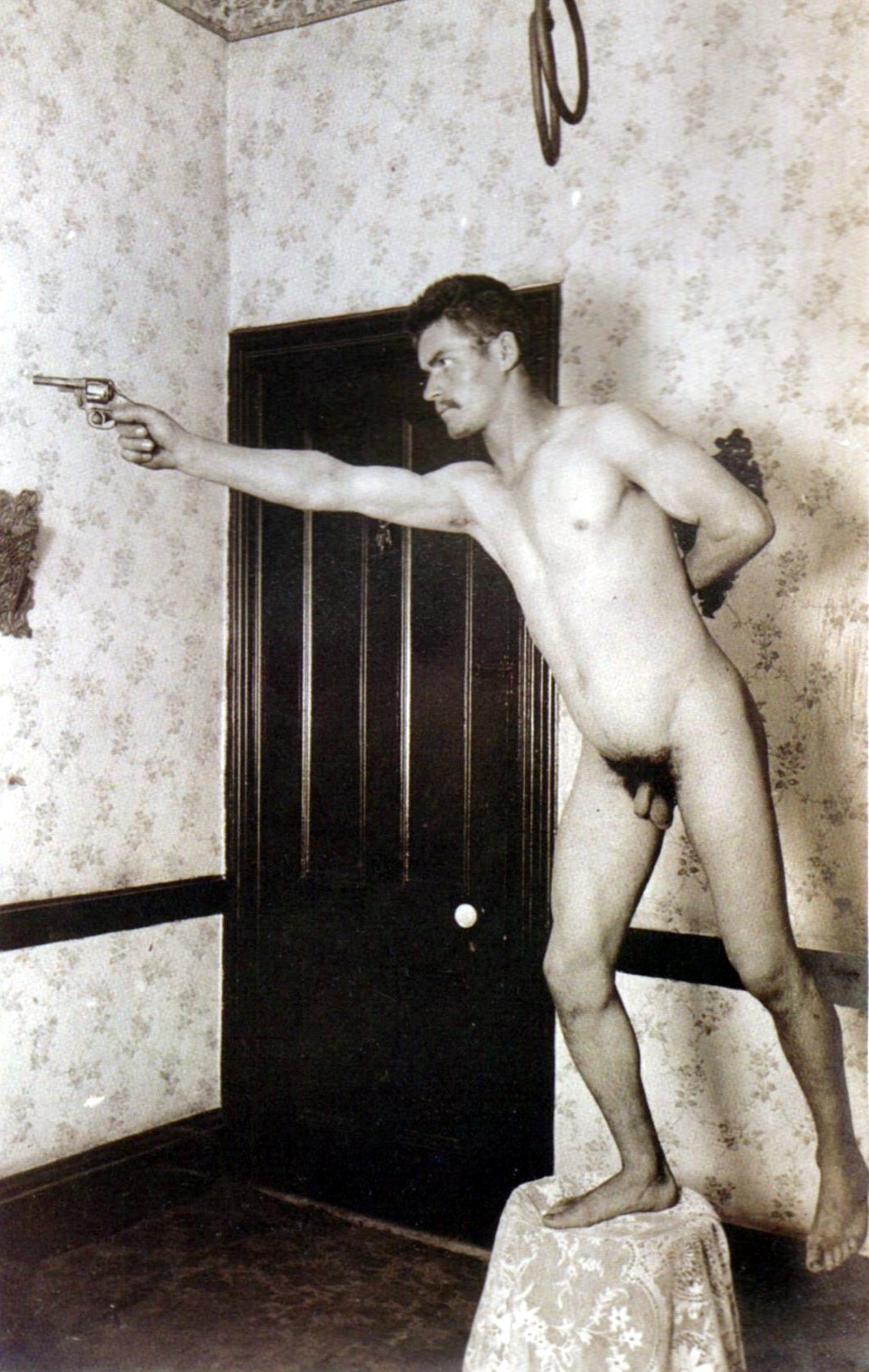
Man with gun, identified as a customer

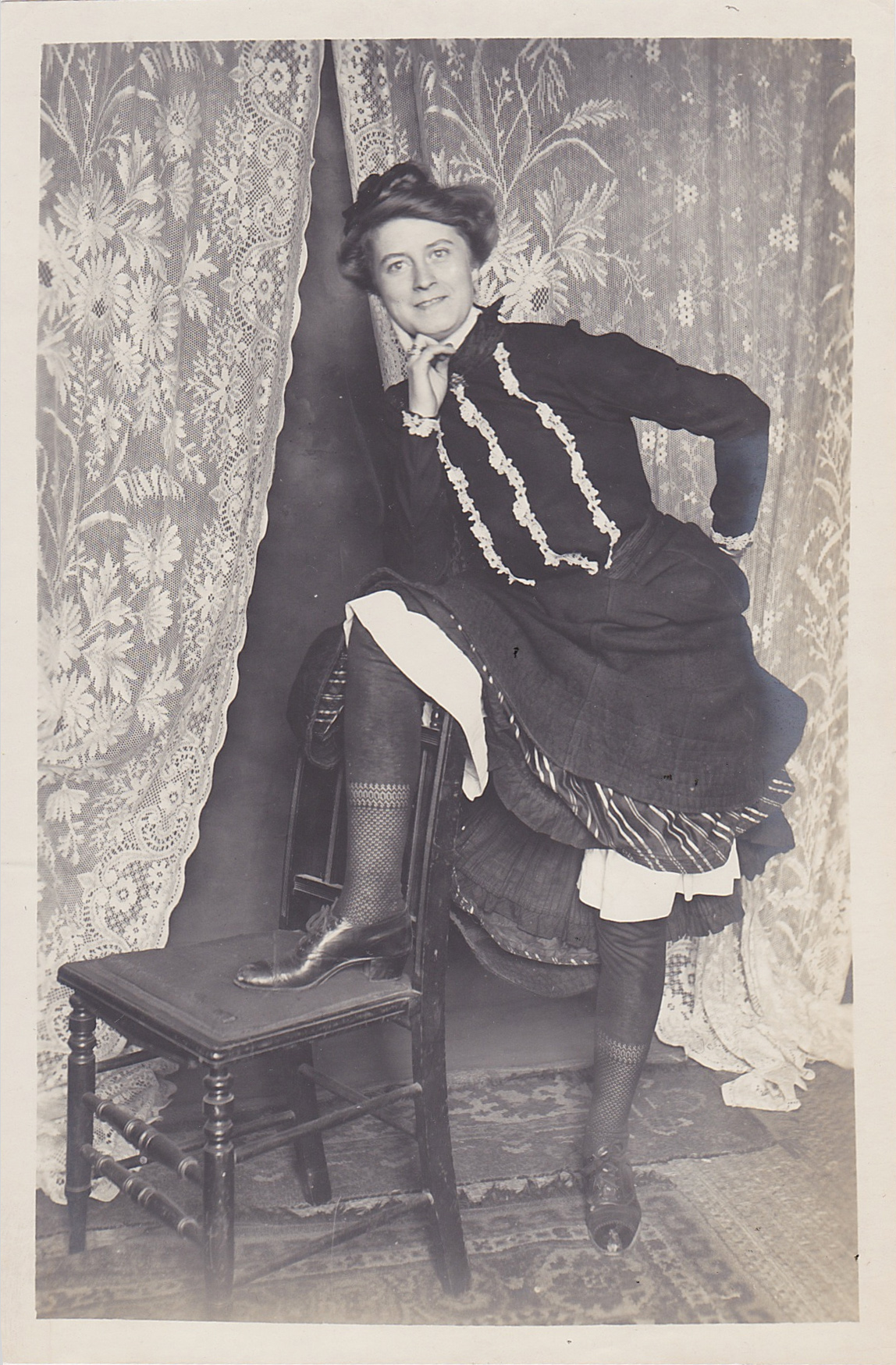
Contemporary fashions

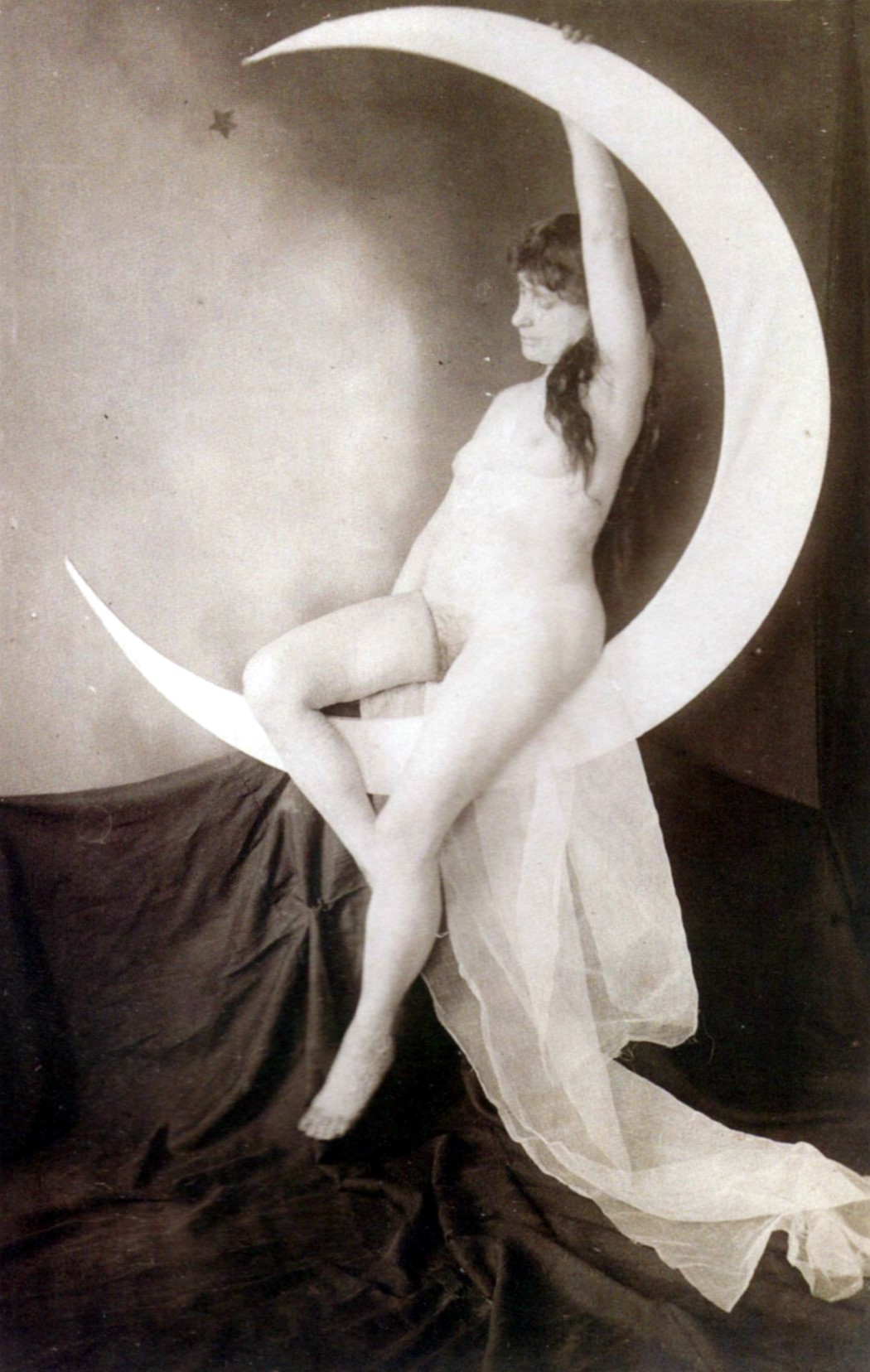
Woman with crescent moon

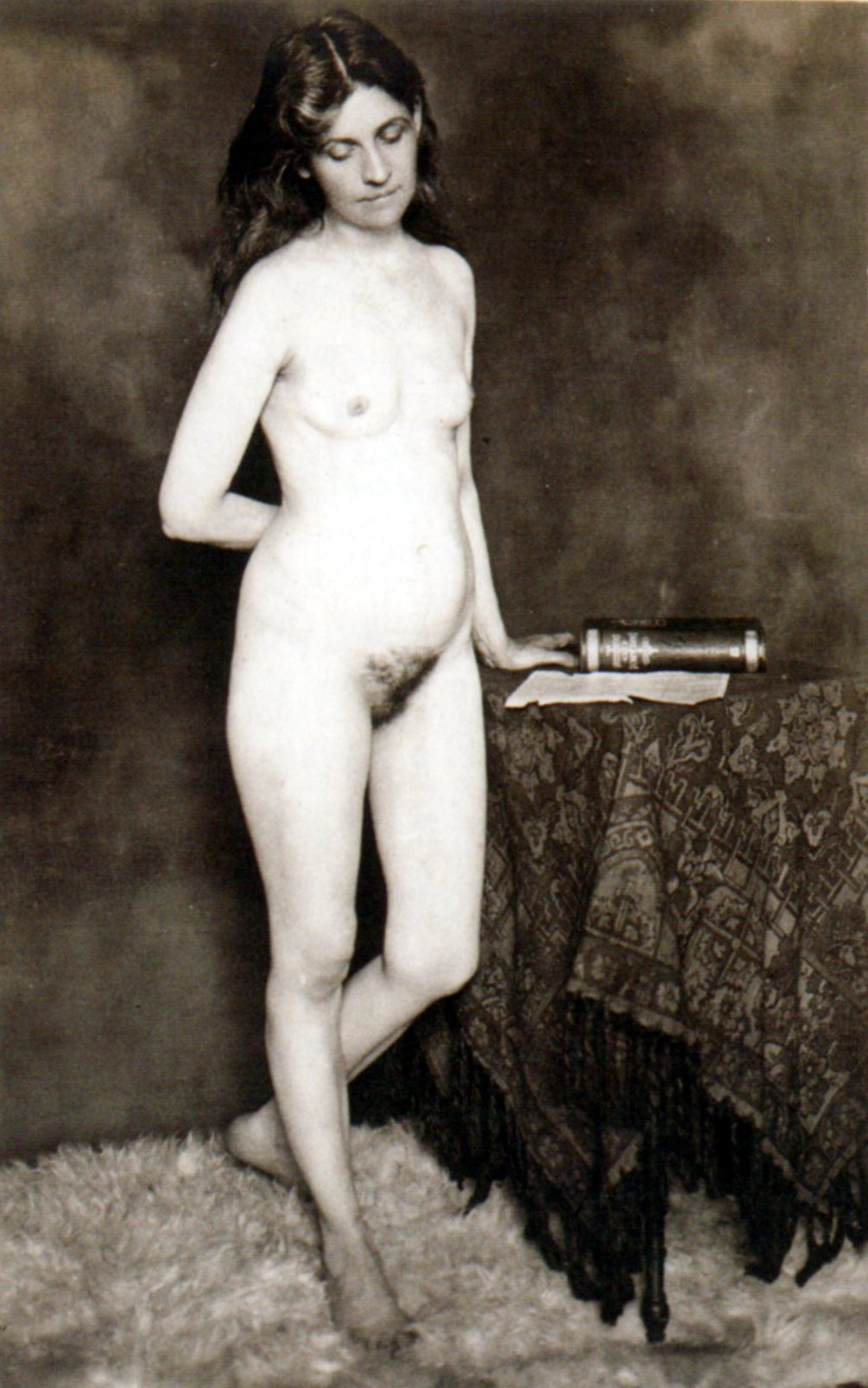
Woman with John Cowan's The Science of a New Life

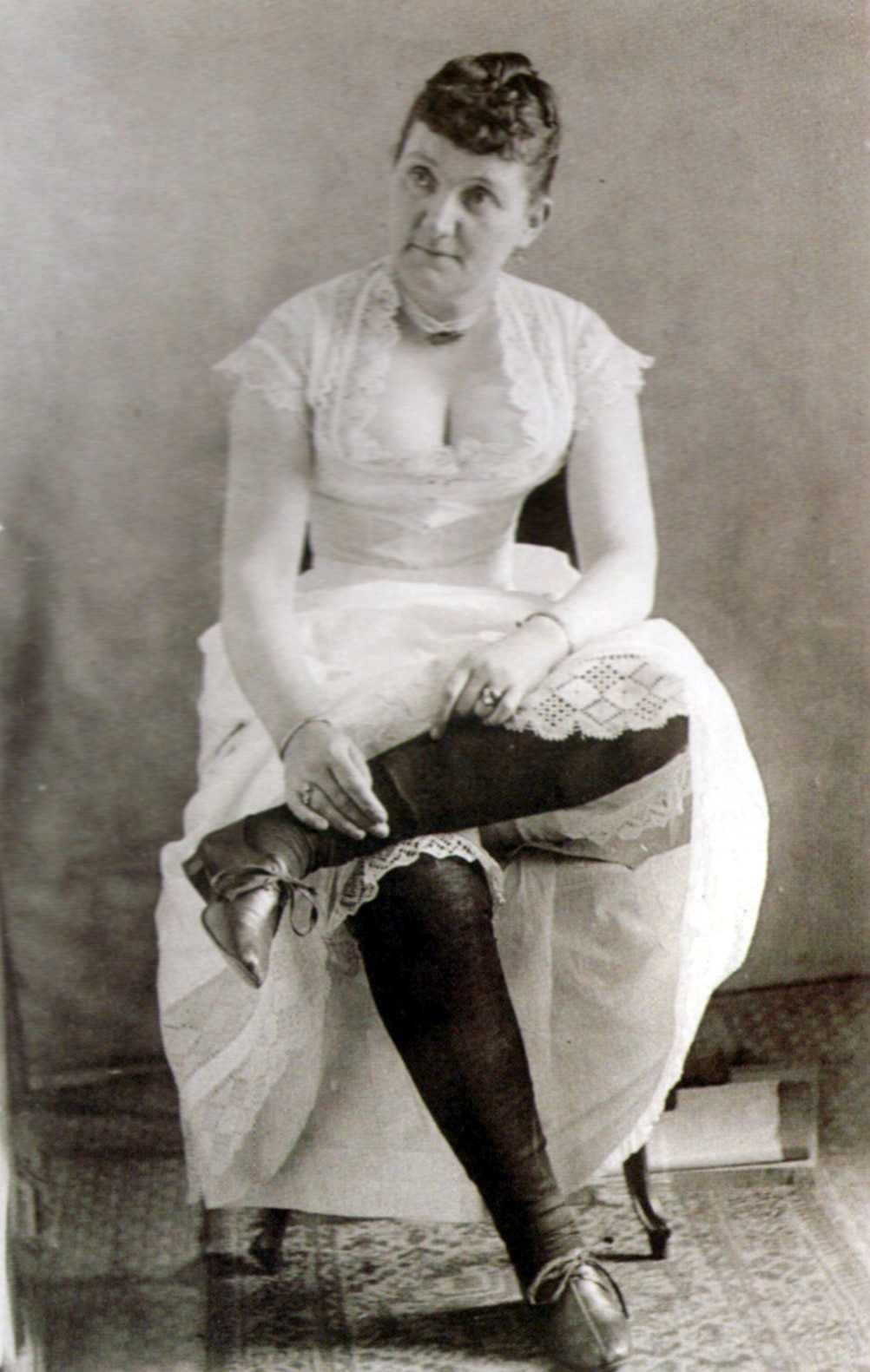
Elaborate layers of expensive undergarments

== Death and legacy ==
William Goldman died on January 25, 1922, and was buried at the Charles Evans Cemetery in Reading.

In 2018, photographs from his collection were exhibited at the Ricco/Maresca gallery in New York and subsequently at the Serge Sorokko Gallery in San Francisco. A book about his life and collection was published by Glitterati Editions in 2018 with a text by Robert Flynn Johnson, a foreword by Dita Von Teese, a preface by gender historian professor Ruth Rosen, and an essay on costume by fashion historian and curator Dennita Sewell.
