= Claudia Stevens =

American musician

Claudia Stevens (born 1949) is an American musician, performance artist and librettist. Initially a pianist specializing in contemporary music, she is recognized for creating and performing widely an array of interdisciplinary solo performance works, and for her collaborations with composer Allen Shearer as librettist of fourteen operas.

== Early career ==
Claudia Stevens was born in Redding, California, on May 29, 1949, and attended Vassar College, graduating summa cum laude with the Frances Walker Prize in piano performance. She studied piano with Leon Fleisher, Arie Vardi and Leonard Shure, receiving the DMA from Boston University in 1977. She also attended the University of California at Berkeley (MA in musicology, Alfred Hertz Fellowship, 1972) and twice was a fellow in piano at the Tanglewood Music Center. In 1977 Stevens joined the Music faculty at the College of William and Mary, where her papers and an archive of her original works and recordings are housed. Stevens's piano performances focused on new music, with recitals in 1979 and 1981 at the National Gallery in Washington, DC, in honor of Roger Sessions and Aaron Copland. Her 1983 Carnegie Recital Hall concert honoring Elliott Carter was sponsored by the New York Composers' Forum. Stevens commissioned over twenty American composers, including Shulamit Ran, Samuel Adler, Robert Xavier Rodriguez, Andrew Imbrie, Allen Shearer, Sheila Silver, Betsy Jolas, Ellen Taaffe Zwilich, Jeffrey Mumford and Vivian Fine, to contribute new pieces for those recitals, also performing them in Dallas and Boston's Jordan Hall. Most of the compositions, including two of her own, were published in the journal Perspectives of New Music.

== 1980s to 2000s ==
In 1985 Stevens launched a career as a musical and dramatic solo performer, creating a repertoire of some twenty original works, first in collaboration with composers including Vivian Fine in The Heart Disclosed (1988) and Fred Cohen in An Evening with Madame F (1989), which was televised and presented in performance continuously for twenty-five seasons. By the 90's, portraying Felice Bauer in Felice to Franz (1992) and multiple characters in Playing Paradis (1994), Stevens was composing both music and text. A Table Before Me (1999) and In the Puppeteer's Wake (2000), of which Baltimore Sun theater critic J. Wynn Rousuck wrote, "Claudia Stevens is a performance artist adept at using the unlikely to unearth unexpected truths," drew on Stevens's Holocaust-related family history. Dreadful Sorry, Guys (2001), one of three works published by Andrei Codrescu in his poetry journal Exquisite Corpse, dealt with hate crimes and homophobia. The Poisoner on the Train (2004) was staged by Baltimore Theater Project to commemorate the World Trade Center terrorist attacks. Blue Lias, or the Fish Lizard's Whore (2007), about fossil hunter Mary Anning, explored controversies between science and religion. Its presentations around the Charles Darwin bi-centennial included the Cleveland Museum of Natural History. Flea (2008) and Pigeon (2011), about naturalist Miriam Rothschild, dealt with human-animal relations. Pitch (2012), a memoir about musical awakening; Red Currants, Black Currants (2013), about Irene Nemirovsky's last months; Teaching Moments (2015) and Fragments Shored Against Ruins (2018), about Beethoven's failed idealism, were created for Sonic Harvest in Berkeley. Andersen (2024), a one-act play for high school theatre performance, premiered in Charlottesville and Richmond, Virginia, receiving many honors.

== Opera librettist, 2008 to present ==
In collaboration with composer Allen Shearer, Stevens created librettos for fourteen operas:

- The Dawn Makers (2008), a chamber opera in one act, of which Allan Ulrich wrote in Opera “Claudia Stevens’s libretto sings well and wavers cunningly between comedy and pathos”
- A Very Large Mole (2009), a chamber opera in one act, after Kafka.
- Riddle Me (2010), a chamber opera for youth in one act, commissioned by Opera Theater of UC, Santa Cruz
- Middlemarch in Spring (2014), a chamber opera in two acts after the novel by George Eliot reviewed by Joshua Kosman of the San Francisco Chronicle and Janos Gereben in the San Francisco Examiner who noted Stevens's adaptation for "keeping Eliot’s voice and the meandering story intact—and even enhanced—within the constraints of inevitable abbreviation and the demands of the stage.” Kosman also named Middlemarch in Spring one of the ten best Bay Area operas produced in 2015 and it was listed by Encyclopædia Britannica as a major new classical work on the world stage.
- Kissing Marfa (2015), a comic chamber opera in one scene based on a short story by Chekhov.
- Circe's Pigs (2015), a comic chamber opera in one act based on an episode from Homer's Odyssey
- Howards End, America (2016), a chamber opera in three acts after the novel by E. M. Forster. Referring to a preview of scenes from Act III, San Francisco Classical Voice noted that the libretto "masterfully adapts the E. M. Forster story to McCarthy-era Boston." Major notices of the opera's Feb. 22–24, 2019 premiere: San Francisco Chronicle Critic's Pick of the Week (Kosman), Los Angeles Times article, "Edwardian London is 1950's Boston and Leonard Bast is black," Operawire's extensive review calling the work "elegant, thoughtful and persuasive," citing Stevens's "eloquent lyrics" and concluding, "We need more opera at this level that is provocative, as well as satisfying," and a review in the San Francisco Examiner, "Operatic ‘Howards End, America’ a refreshing stateside spin on classic story."
- Jackie at Vassar (2019), a chamber opera in one act, to be premiered by the University of Nevada, Las Vegas Opera Theatre Nov. 12 and 13, 2026
- Prospero's Island (2021), an opera in two acts after Shakespeare's The Tempest. The opera's San Francisco premiere at Herbst Theatre on March 25, 2023 was the San Francisco Chronicle's critic's pick of the week. The work was cited by Lois Silverstein in OperaWire as "original, thought-provoking, engaging musical richness and full of ideas"; by Victor Cordell in Berkshire Fine Arts as a "score and script [that] swirl with surprises"; by Jeff Dunn in Aisle Seat Review as a "treasure chest of invention," and by Heidi de Vries (KALX) as a "brilliant update [of The Tempest].
- Einstein at Princeton (2022), a chamber opera in one act with premiere in Berkeley on Dec. 5, 2023, a production of Berkeley Chamber Performances. The opera's music was praised as "delightful and accessible," with an intimacy "in a small but poignant way, demonstrating that profound matters can be distilled into small vessels."
- The Singer, Josephine (2023), a chamber opera in one act after Kafka premiered in Berkeley in 2024
- What Aaron Copland Said (2024), a chamber opera in one act premiered in Berkeley in 2025
- Leaving the White House (2026), a chamber opera in one act to be premiered in Berkeley Oct. 18, 2026
- The Portal (2026)

== Interviews (selected) ==
- Charles Sydnor WCVE (Richmond) broadcast (1990)
- Dee Perry WCPN (Cleveland) broadcast (2009)
- "Revelation, a conversation with Claudia Stevens" in Reform Judaism (2009)
- Erica Miner in Broadway World, San Francisco and LA Opus, May, 2015
- West Edge Opera Director Mark Streshinsky interview (Jan., 2017) of Claudia Stevens with Allen Shearer
- San Francisco Classical Voice interview, Feb. 9, 2019
- Erica Miner in Broadway World, San Francisco, Nov. 9, 2022

== Published writings ==
- “A New Look at Schumann's Impromptus" in Musical Quarterly (1981)
- "A Bouquet for Elliott Carter," Perspectives of New Music, (1983)
- "I, My Man, Only and Doll: monologues for one to four performers by Claudia Stevens" (the original title of “Dreadful Sorry, Guys”) in the online journal Exquisite Corpse (2001)
- The Poisoner on the Train in the online journal Exquisite Corpse (2003)
- "A Very Large Mole: A chamber opera after Franz Kafka" in the online journal Exquisite Corpse (2010).
- "A New Opera: Middlemarch in Spring" in George Eliot-George Henry Lewes Studies (2015)
- "Page to Stage: A New Opera, Howards End, America" in the Polish Journal of English Studies, March 2, 2017, a special issue devoted to E.M. Forster
- "Adela in the Cave," text of a scene from E. M. Forster's A Passage to India in the Polish Journal of English Studies, December, 2024.

=== Archives ===
Archives of Stevens’s papers and original works: Claudia Stevens Papers, 1967-continuing, Swem Library Special Collections, College of William and Mary: Series 1: Claudia Stevens’s papers as pianist and in the commissioning and advocacy of music of the second half of the twentieth century, 1966–2003 (includes Roger Sessions and Elliott Carter commissioning projects); Series 2: Works of Claudia Stevens as interdisciplinary performer, writer, composer, playwright and librettist, 1986 - continuing. Audiovisual collection in Manuscripts mss. 1.04 includes audio VHS and DVD recordings, radio and television broadcasts. University of Richmond, Boatwright Library: Claudia Stevens's papers and memorabilia re performances of "An Evening with Madame F," 1989 - 2006; Aaron Copland House: Papers devoted to Stevens's commissioning project honoring Aaron Copland, 1980–81; archive of Allen Shearer works at California State University, East Bay (collaborative works).|
