= Sherer =

Sherer is a surname. Notable people with the surname include:

- Albert W. Sherer Jr. (1916–1986), American diplomat
- Charlie Sherer (1903–1967), Australian rules footballer
- Dave Sherer (born 1937), American football player
- David Sherer (born 1957), American physician and author
- Jason Sherer, American politician
- Kara Wagner Sherer, American Episcopal priest
- Moshe Sherer (1921–1998), Israeli Jewish religious leader
- Moyle Sherer (1789–1869), British army officer, traveller, and writer
- Rod Sherer (born 1964), American politician
- Teal Sherer (born 1980), American actress
- Tommy Sherer (born 1948), American politician

== See also ==
- Shearer
