= John Cowan (physician) =

American physician

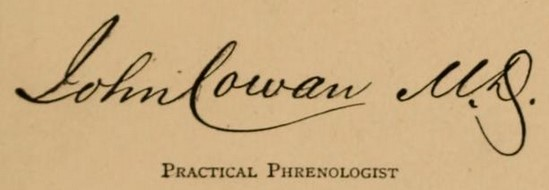
John Cowan signature

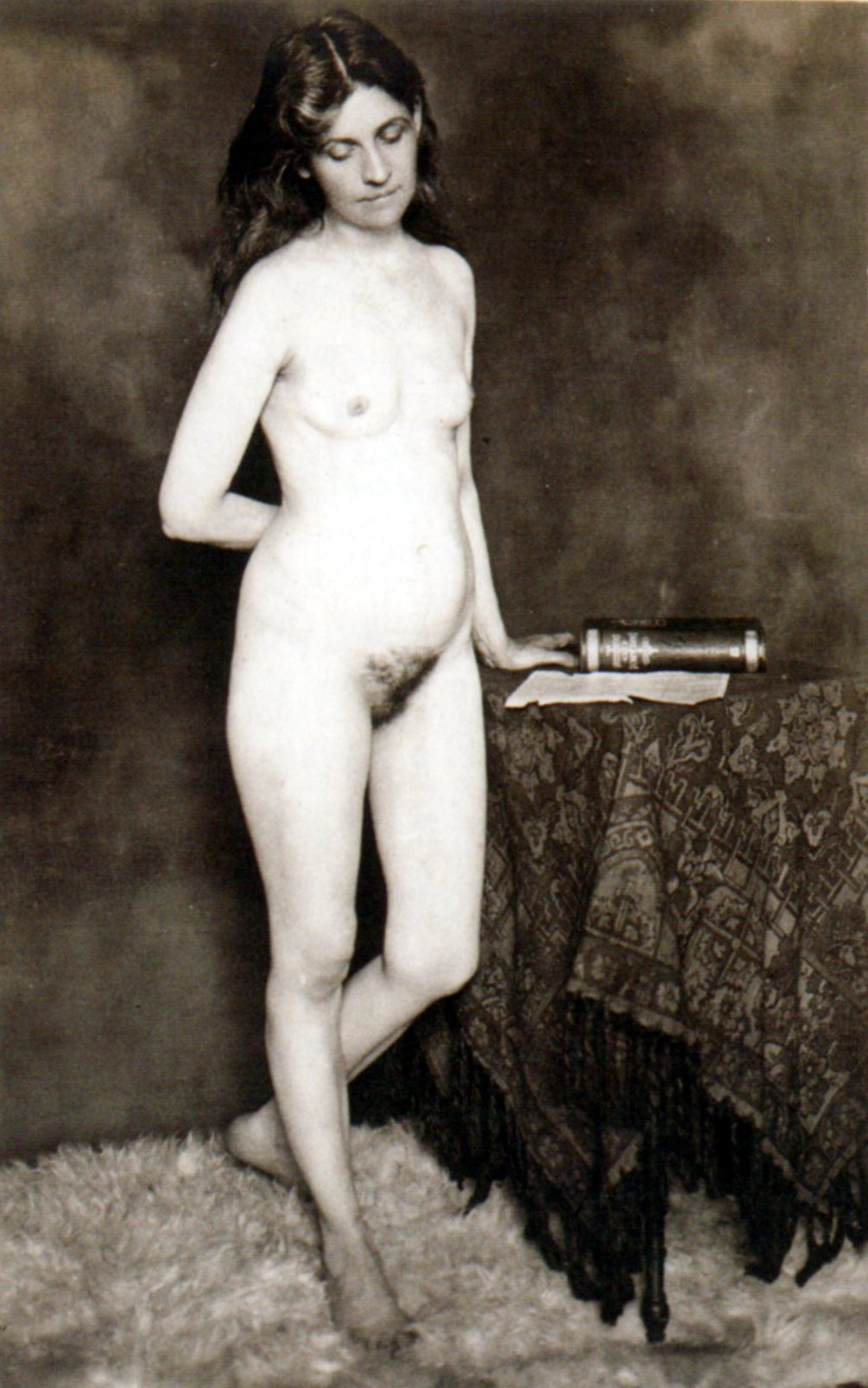
Woman with Cowan's The Science of a New Life photographed by William Goldman c. 1892.

John Cowan was an American physician and phrenologist who wrote on sexual health, women's rights, and the evils of tobacco.

His 1869 manual for married couples, The Science of a New Life, was endorsed by the suffragist Elizabeth Cady Stanton. It was issued in many editions, with parts of the original text expurgated to suit prevailing morality, such as his advice about contraception. It was re-issued with the new title of What All Married People Should Know in 1903. In his 1870 book, Self-help in the Attainment of Perfection of Character and Success in Life, he described himself as a "practical phrenologist".

== Selected publications ==
- The Science of a New Life. Cowan & Co., New York, 1869.
- Self-help in the Attainment of Perfection of Character and Success in Life with a Phrenological and Physiological Chart. Cowan & Co., New York, 1870.
- What to Eat, and How to Cook It: Preserving, Canning and Drying Fruits and Vegetables. Cowan & Co., New York, 1870.
- The Use of Tobacco vs. Purity, Chastity and Sound Health. Cowan & Co., New York, 1870.
