= Sheerer =

Sheerer is a surname. Notable people with the surname include:

- Gary Sheerer (born 1947), American water polo player
- Judy Sheerer (born 1940), American politician
- Mary Given Sheerer (1865–1954), American ceramicist, designer, and art educator

== See also ==
- Shearer, another surname
- Sharer, another surname
