= Robert Flynn Johnson =

Robert Flynn Johnson is a specialist in anonymous images.

== Selected publications ==
- The Power of Light: Daguerreotypes from the Robert Harshorn Shimshak Collection. Achenbach Foundation for Graphic Arts, San Francisco, 1986. ISBN 9780884010500
- Artists' Books in the Modern Era 1870-2000. Thames & Hudson, 2002.
- Anonymous: Enigmatic Images from Unknown Photographers. Thames & Hudson, 2004. ISBN 9780500542927
- The Face in the Lens Anonymous Photographs. University of California Press, 2009. ISBN 9780520259836
- Working Girls: An American Brothel, circa 1892. The Secret Photographs of William Goldman. Glitterati Editions, New York, 2018. ISBN 9781943876587
- Plant Kingdoms: The Photographs of Charles Jones
- Peter Milton Etchings: Complete Prints 1960-1996
- Norman Lundin: A Decade of Drawing and Painting

== See also ==
- William Goldman
