= David Clarence Gibboney =

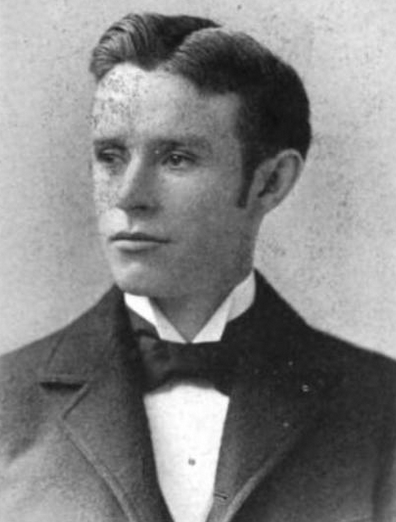
David Clarence Gibboney

David Clarence Gibboney (December 12, 1868 – December 28, 1920) was an American lawyer and politician. He the secretary of the Law and Order Society in Philadelphia in the United States since 1890. Gibboney was described by Philadelphia mayor Rudolph Blankenburg as one of the leading men in the city and responsible for the arrest of thousands of brothel-keepers, "white slavers", and people breaking gambling and liquor laws.

Gibboney was born on December 12, 1868, in Iowa. When he was two years old, his family moved to Lisbon, Iowa. After graduating from Cornell College in Mount Vernon, Iowa, Gibboney moved to Philadelphia, where he entered the College of Pharmacy in October 1890. The following year, he began studying at Jefferson Medical College—now known as Thomas Jefferson University. During this time, Gibboney studied law in the office of Joseph W. Kenworthy, and was admitted to the bar in 1896. He ran unsuccessfully for several political offices in Philadelphia: sheriff, District Attorney of Philadelphia, and then Mayor of Philadelphia in 1911, when he lost the Keystone party nomination to Blankenburg. Gibboney drown on December 28, 1920, near Champotón, Campeche, Mexico.
