= Michelle Scherer =

American environmental geochemist

Michelle Marie Scherer
- Education: OGI School of Science and Engineering; University of Connecticut (MS) University of Virginia (BSc)
- Scientific career
- Workplaces: University of Iowa
- Thesis: Equilibrium studies of chromate adsorption on glacio-fluvial aquifer sediments (MS) (1994)
- Website: Scherer Laboratory

Michelle Marie Scherer is the current dean of the College of Engineering at Michigan Technological University. She previously served as the Donald E. Bently Professor of Engineering at the University of Iowa. Her research considers environmental geochemistry, in particular redox-reactions at mineral-water interfaces. In 2009 she was awarded the Association of Environmental Engineering and Science Professors Distinguished Service Award.

== Early life and education ==
Scherer grew up in New Jersey. She enjoyed mathematics and problem solving as a child, and was particularly interested in using engineering in an environmental context. She studied systems engineering at the University of Virginia. She moved to the University of Connecticut where she earned a master's degree in civil and environmental engineering. Scherer joined the OGI School of Science and Engineering for her doctoral studies and earned a PhD in 1998.

== Research and career ==
In 1998 Scherer joined the University of Iowa as an assistant professor. She was promoted to professor in 2010 and made a chair in the Department of Civil and Environmental Engineering. That year she was awarded the AEESP Frontier in Research Award. Scherer specialises in environmental geochemistry, in particular, the interaction of pollution and soil. Before Scherer it was believed that pollutants only interacted with the surfaces of soil and minerals, but Scherer has demonstrated that they can penetrate the interiors of mineral particles.

Her research considers the reduction-oxidation reactions that occur at iron oxide surfaces. She has investigated the attenuation of chlorinated solvents (including perchloroethylene, PCE, and trichloroethylene, TCE) through biological degradation, and the impact of abiotic degradation due to iron minerals in natural attenuation. She has shown that at high iron concentrations the formation of metastable mineral phases can reduce the PCE and TCE, making them more susceptible to attenuation.

She is involved with a University of Iowa project to monitor the levels of lead in Iowan drinking water, which is known to impact children's physical and mental capacity. Whilst the Flint water crisis occurred due to city-wide changes in water sources and poor control of corrosion, Iowan homes often have sources of lead in their own plumbing, and need lead monitoring at the tap.

In 2014 she spoke about Women Leaders in Environmental Chemistry at the annual American Chemical Society meeting. She joined the United States Environmental Protection Agency Advisory Board in 2014.

In 2024 she became the Dean of the College of Engineering at Michigan Tech.

=== Awards and honours ===
Her awards and honours include:

- 2010 Malcolm Pirnie Frontier in Research Award
- 2015 Excellence in Teaching and Dedication to Student Success
- 2016 May Brodbeck Distinguished Achievement Award

=== Selected publications ===
Her publications include:

- Johnson, Timothy L.; Scherer, Michelle; Tratnyek, Paul G. (1996-07-25). "Kinetics of halogenated organic compound degradation by iron metal". Environmental Science & Technology. 30 (8): 2634–2640. Bibcode:1996EnST...30.2634J. doi:10.1021/es9600901.
- Alowitz, Michael J.; Scherer, Michelle (2002-02-01). "Kinetics of nitrate, nitrite, and Cr (VI) reduction by iron metal". Environmental Science & Technology. 36 (3): 299–306. Bibcode:2002EnST...36..299A. doi:10.1021/es011000h. PMID 11871541.
- Williams, Aaron G. B.; Scherer, Michelle (2001-09-01). "Kinetics of Cr (VI) reduction by carbonate green rust". Environmental Science & Technology. 35 (17): 3488–3494. Bibcode:2001EnST...35.3488W. doi:10.1021/es010579g. PMID 11563651.
