= Barbara Shearer =

- Born: September 16, 1936; Ottawa, Illinois
- Died: December 6, 2005 (aged 69)
- Occupation(s): pedagogue, performer, teacher
- Instrument: Piano

Barbara Shearer (September 16, 1936, in Ottawa, Illinois – December 6, 2005) was an American pianist and pedagogue at the University of California, Berkeley.

== Early life and education ==
Shearer spent her childhood in the rural Midwest. She attended Carthage College for two years, then Wittenberg University in Ohio, where she graduated with a bachelor's degree in music. On the advice of her teachers, she went to New York City in 1958 to study piano with Leonard Shure, whom she later followed to Zurich and Munich. A later influence was Karl Ulrich Schnabel, from whom she received valuable coaching and with whom she taught as a colleague.

In 1963 Shearer was about to take a teaching job in New York, but one of her teachers in Ohio dissuaded her, offering to buy her a bus ticket to San Francisco instead. She did graduate work at the University of California, Berkeley, and in 1964 married singer and composer Allen Shearer. In 1978 she joined the performance faculty at UC Berkeley, where she taught until shortly before her death.
