= Ray Shearer (footballer) =

Australian rules footballer

Personal information
- Full name: Raymond Alfred Shearer
- Born: 16 September 1924
- Died: 9 May 1975 (aged 50); Canberra
- Original team: Donald
- Height: 175 cm (5 ft 9 in)
- Weight: 82 kg (181 lb)

Playing career^{1}
Years	Club	Games (Goals)
1942	Melbourne	2 (0)
- ^{1} Playing statistics correct to the end of 1942.

Raymond Alfred Shearer (16 September 1924 – 9 May 1975) was an Australian rules footballer who played with Melbourne in the Victorian Football League (VFL).
