= Allen Shearer =

American composer and baritone (born 1943)

Allen Raymond Shearer (born October 5, 1943, in Seattle, Washington) is an American composer and baritone.

== Life ==
Shearer’s early musical experiences were as a singer; the majority of his works are for the voice or voices, with a later emphasis on opera. With his first wife, pianist Barbara Shearer (1936–2005), Shearer's performances included art songs, some of which were his own. He studied at the University of California at Berkeley, where he earned a PhD in 1972, and at the Mozarteum in Salzburg, Austria where he received diplomas in concert singing and opera. He taught voice in Special Programs at the University of California at Berkeley. Among his composition teachers were Fred Lerdahl, Seymour Shifrin, Andrew Imbrie and Max Deutsch, with whom he studied in Paris. His awards in music include the Rome Prize Fellowship, the Aaron Copland Award, the Sylvia Goldstein Award, a Charles Ives Scholarship, residencies at the MacDowell Colony, and grants from the National Endowment for the Arts.

== Musical style ==
When asked about his musical style in the discussion preceding the 2009 premiere of his opera The Dawn Makers, Shearer answered that it varies according to the demands of the medium. Critics also describe it variously. The Harvard Biographical Dictionary of Music observes that Shearer’s music, "though it recalls postwar serialism in its rhythms and textures, relies on traditional counterpoint and on tonal centers." Its lyric quality is frequently cited: Jeff Rosenfeld, reviewing Shearer’s Outbound Passenger, found the music "tuneful and harmonious;" and of Shearer’s cantata King Midas, critic Robert Commanday wrote, ‘The singing lines are fluid and supple, animated, alive; the harmony and scoring for a quintet of instruments and percussion battery (two players), rich but delicately so." In the British periodical Opera, Allan Ulrich wrote that the score of Shearer’s chamber opera The Dawn Makers has "genuine personality. The hour-long opera abounds in extended ariosos and bravura outbursts and unfurls in a conservative idiom, spiced with dissonances which neatly evade the neo-Romantic pitfalls that prevail in American opera circles." Of the same work, Thomas Busse wrote in San Francisco Classical Voice, "The music’s greatest strength was its singability, attributable to the composer’s being a vocalist himself. I would describe Shearer’s eclectic style as more declamatory than lyrical." Of Shearer's opera Middlemarch in Spring Janos Gereben wrote in the San Francisco Examiner, "Shearer's music is pleasantly dissonant, with a sound that sticks in the ears and memory. It's ambiguous music, seemingly wondering [sic] between keys, but landing securely each time."

== Recent works ==
=== Opera ===
- The Portal (2026), opera in one act on a libretto by Claudia Stevens
- Leaving the White House (2026), opera in one act on a libretto by Claudia Stevens
- What Aaron Copland Said (2025), opera in one act on a libretto by Claudia Stevens
- The Singer Josephine (2023), opera in one act on a libretto by Claudia Stevens after Kafka
- Einstein at Princeton (2022), opera in one act on a libretto by Claudia Stevens
- Prospero's Island (2021), opera in two acts on a libretto by Claudia Stevens after Shakespeare's The Tempest
- Jackie at Vassar (2019), opera in one act on a libretto by Claudia Stevens
- Howards End, America (2018), opera in three acts on a libretto by Claudia Stevens after the novel by E. M. Forster
- Circe's Pigs (2016), chamber opera in one act on a libretto by Claudia Stevens
- Kissing Marfa (2015), comic opera in one scene on a libretto by Claudia Stevens based on a short story by Anton Chekhov
- Middlemarch in Spring (2014), chamber opera in two acts on a libretto by Claudia Stevens after the novel by George Eliot
- Riddle Me (2010), chamber opera in one act on a libretto by Claudia Stevens
- A Very Large Mole (2009), chamber opera in one act on a libretto after Franz Kafka by Claudia Stevens
- The Dawn Makers (2008), chamber opera in one act on a libretto by Claudia Stevens
- The Goddess (1997), opera in four acts on a libretto by the composer after the screenplay by Satyajit Ray

=== Instrumental works ===
- Dialogue VI (2026) for oboe and violin
- All This (2026) for oboe quartet
- Dialogue V (2026) for viola and piano
- Expedition (2025) for string trio
- Dialogue IV (2025) for bassoon and viola
- Dialogue III (2025) for two violins
- Dialogue II: Portals (2025) for clarinet and violin
- Dialogue I (2025) for bass clarinet duo
- Reveille (2024) for trumpet, trombone and tuba, with a version for trumpet, horn and trombone
- Three's Company (2024) for flute, bassoon and viola
- Weft (2024) for clarinet, bassoon and piano
- Forest Scene (2024) for unaccompanied violin
- Nocturne (2023) for nine cellos
- Wink for wind ensemble (2023)
- Duo (2022) for violin and cello
- Impossible Marriage (2022) for clarinet, violin and piano
- Eastbound Traveler (2021) for mixed quartet
- October (2020) for brass quintet
- Early Start (2019) for flute, cello and piano
- Thinking Thoughts (2019) for violin and piano
- Sea Critter (2016) for piano solo
- Road Piece (2015) for brass trio and percussion
- Intermezzo (2014) for clarinet solo
- Footloose (2013) for flute, violin and guitar
- Roundelay (2011) for oboe, clarinet and bassoon
- Riff on a Verse (2011) for violin and percussion
- Terrains (2010) for piano and string trio
- Forthrights and Meanders (2009) for violin, cello and piano
- Soliloquy (2009) for viola solo
- Bagatelles (2006) for flute and clarinet
- Memory Beams (2005) for violin and guitar

=== Choral works ===
- So I Will Till the Ground (2025) for mixed chorus SATB
- Lyrics for Chorus (2023) for mixed chorus SATB
- Romanç de matinet (2012) for mixed chorus SATB
- Listen. Put on Morning (2011) for mixed chorus SSATB
- The Holy Innocents (2011) for mixed chorus SSAATTBB
- Hymn to Gaia (2010) for mixed chorus SATB and chamber ensemble
- Orpheus in the Underworld (2010) for men’s chorus TTBB
- Songs of the Moment (2007) for women’s chorus SSAA

=== Vocal works ===
- Dance us to pieces (2026) for soprano and piano
- Echoes (2024) for soprano, cello and piano
- Duets for Voice and Oboe (2024) for soprano and oboe
- Plenitudes (2022) for soprano, flute, viola and guitar
- Strange Gifts (2022) for baritone and piano
- From Spell to Trance (2021) for soprano and piano
- The River-Merchant’s Wife (2018) for soprano, flute, viola and piano
- Psalm, Lament and Aubade (2018) for soprano, clarinet and piano
- November Gold (2017) for medium voice and piano
- Stories Wind Told to Grass (2015) for mezzo soprano, flute, cello and piano
- The Leaves of Another Year (2014) for baritone, clarinet and guitar
- Night Songs II (2009) for mezzo soprano, viola and piano
- Learning the Elements (2007) for mezzo soprano, clarinet, cello and piano
- Night Songs (2005) for medium voice, clarinet/bass clarinet, viola and harp
- How Poems Are Made (2006) for soprano and piano
- Secrets (2003) for mezzo soprano, flute, cello and piano
- Fables II (2002) for mezzo soprano or baritone, flute, guitar and double bass

== Discography ==
- Five Poems of Wallace Stevens, "Dimensions," CRS 8944
- Nude Descending a Staircase, "I Have Had Singing", Chanticleer Records CR 8810
- Mushrooms, "With a Poet’s Eye", Chanticleer Records CR 8804
- The Illusion of Eternity, "The Anniversary Album 1978-1988," Chanticleer Records CR 8804
