= Christopher Shearer =

American painter

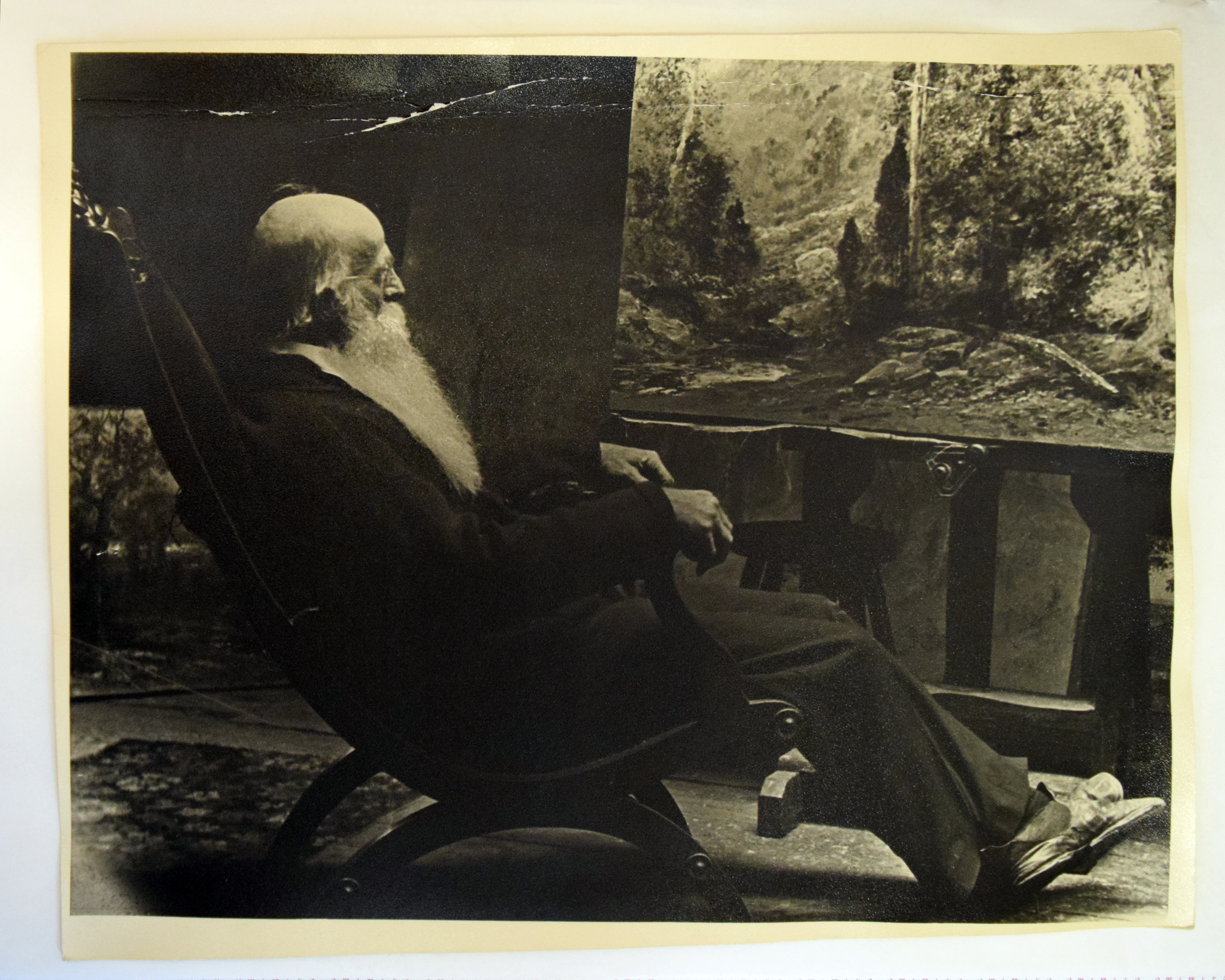
Photographer Unknown, Christopher High Shearer ( American, 1846-1926) in His Studio, black and white photograph, Reading Public Museum, 1996.13.10C

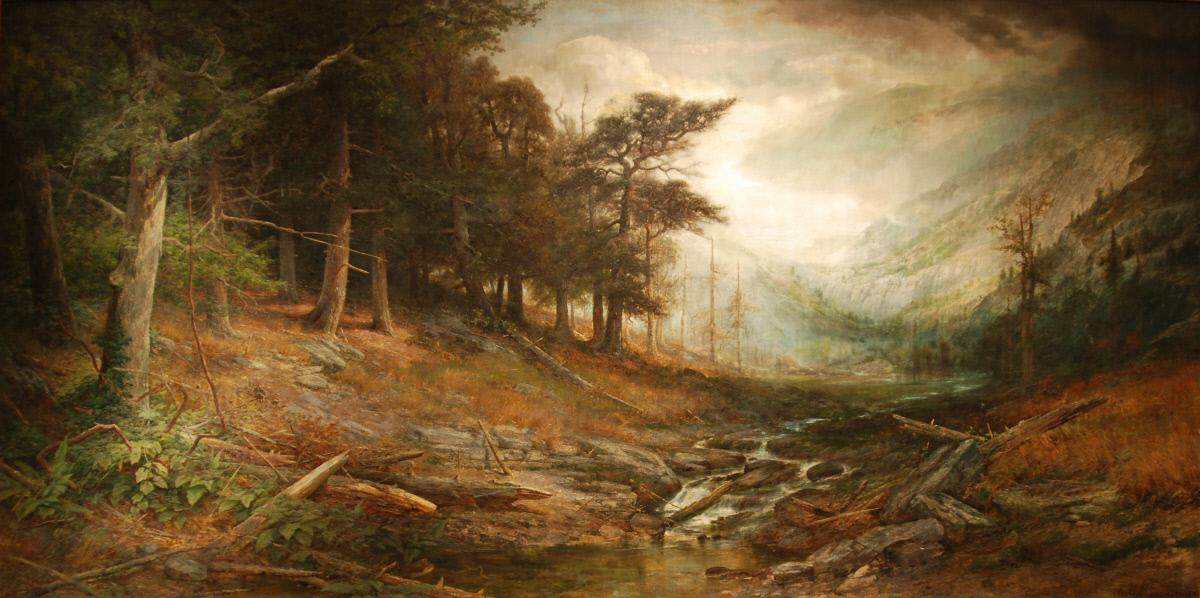
Christopher H. Shearer (American, 1846-1926), Smoky Range, Allegheny Mountains, 1895, oil on canvas, 96 x 192 inches, Reading Public Museum, Gift, Reading Public Library and the City of Reading, 1913.19.6

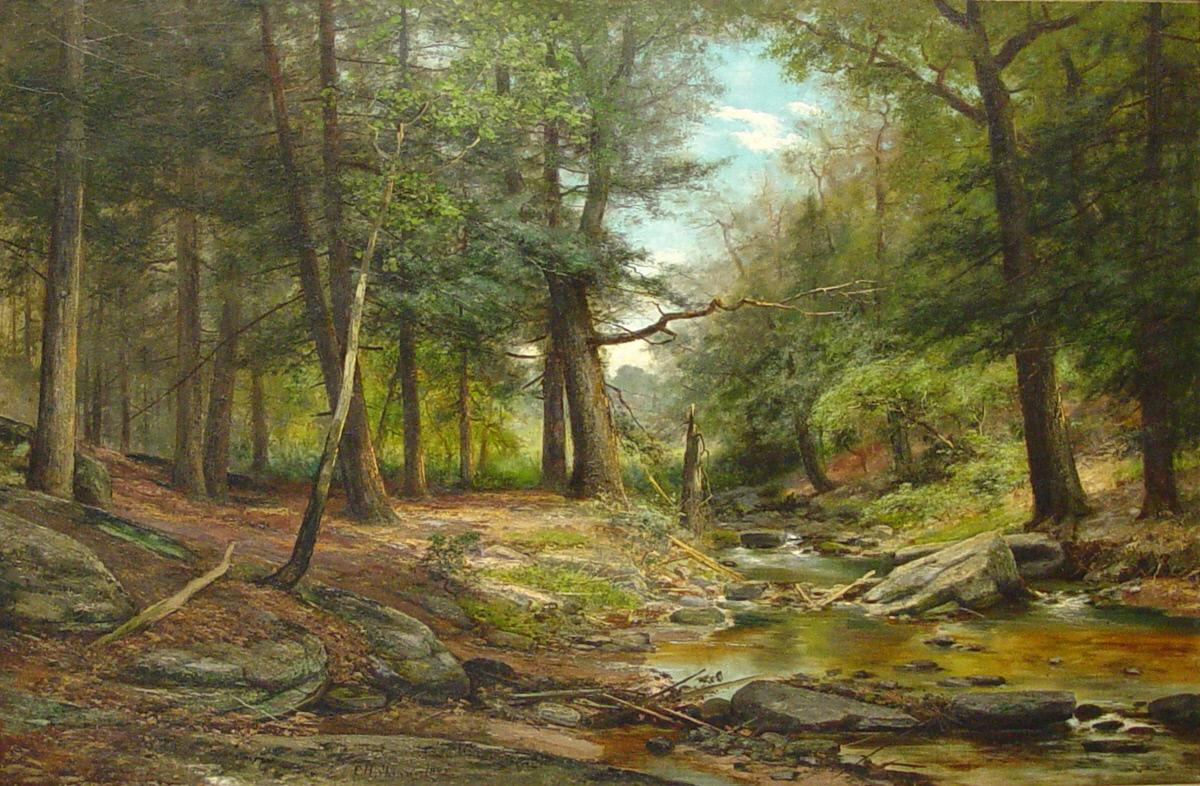
Christopher H. Shearer (American, 1846 - 1926), Landscape, 1892, oil on canvas, 36" x 54"Reading Public Museum, Gift, Mr. Harold G. Evans, 1976.18.1

Christopher High Shearer (1846–1926) was a prolific American painter in Berks County, Pennsylvania, known primarily for his large landscape paintings. Christopher Shearer was born May 18, 1846, in Reading, Pennsylvania to Christopher and Catherine Shearer. As a boy, Shearer spent time in the studios of artists Francis Daniel Devlan and John Heyl Raser. At age 18, Christopher showed an interest in painting professionally, and became a student of both Devlan and Raser. His father helped him by building him a studio in the backyard of his farm in Shearertown (present day Muhlenberg Township). At the age of 21, Shearer opened his own studio in Reading and was very successful in selling his works locally. By age 27 Shearer was nationally recognized artist.

He later traveled to Europe, abandoning his wife Sallie Shearer and their sons, and studied in Düsseldorf and Munich. Shearer exhibited his works at the Pennsylvania Academy of the Fine Arts and at an art exhibition celebrating the United States Centennial in 1876. In 1878, on a return trip to Germany, he was awarded a Gold Medal by the Düsseldorf School of Art. He also exhibited many of his works in a studio he opened in Reading in 1883.

Shearer was a teacher as well as an artist. He held many art classes in his Reading studio to encourage the development of art in Berks County and elsewhere in Pennsylvania. Shearer was instrumental in the founding of the Reading Public Museum. As a friend of Dr. Levi Mengel (the founder of the museum), Shearer was appointed the museum's chief art curator until his death. He also enjoyed collecting butterflies, moths and bugs and kept detailed records and drawings of these insects. Shearer died in Reading in 1926.

Many of his works now hang in the Reading Museum or private collections. His paintings are part of several collections, including ones in Canada, Australia, Germany, and the United States.
