= Law and Order Society =

Temperance and Sabbath observance organization founded in 1881

- Formation: 6 September 1881
- Founded at: Philadelphia, United States
- Purpose: Enforcement of liquor laws; Sabbath enforcement; Temperance; Fighting "white-slavery"
- Headquarters: Philadelphia
- Secretary: David Clarence Gibboney

The Law and Order Society was a temperance and Sabbath observance organization founded in 1881 in Philadelphia in the United States. It campaigned for the enforcement of the liquor laws in that city, the proper observance of the Sabbath, and against "white slavery" (prostitution), but it did not aim to reform prostitutes. It claimed in 1917 to have reduced the number of saloons and similar establishments in Philadelphia from 6,000 to 1,910.

== History ==
The society was formed on 6 September 1881.

It campaigned against "white slavery" (the supposed luring of innocent white girls into prostitution).

Its agents had no official standing but acted as witnesses in court cases against those serving alcohol illegally, such as in 1906 when their agents gave evidence in Reading, Pennsylvania, that the brothel-keeper May Reilly had illegally served liquor on a Sunday.

They conducted raids on speakeasies, confiscating the stock while waiting for officers of the law to arrive.

It claimed in 1917 to have reduced the number of saloons and similar establishments in Philadelphia from 6,000 to 1,910.
