= Elga Meta Shearer =

American educator (1883–1967)

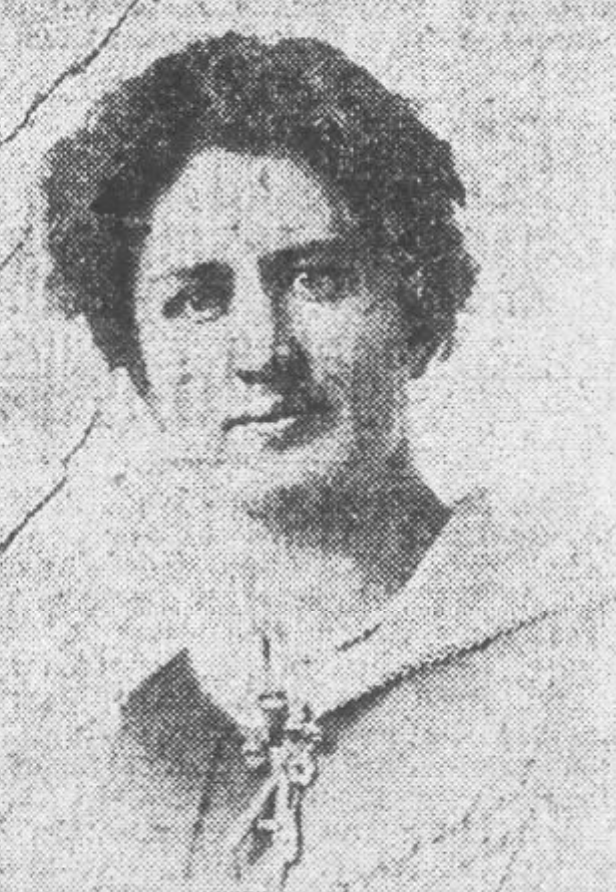
- Elga M. Shearer, from a 1921 newspaper
- Born: February 19, 1883; Kenosha, Wisconsin
- Died: October 11, 1967 (age 84); Kenosha, Wisconsin
- Occupations: Educator, school administrator, textbook author
- Relatives: Conrad Shearer (brother)

Elga Meta Shearer (February 19, 1883 – October 11, 1967) was an American educator, school administrator, and textbook author.

== Early life and education ==
Shearer was born in Kenosha, Wisconsin, the daughter of Peter Tait Shearer and Margaret Brotchie Shearer. Her parents were both born in the Orkney Islands of Scotland. Her older brother Conrad Shearer became a United States senator representing Wisconsin. She graduated from Kenosha High School in 1900. She earned a bachelor's degree from the University of Chicago in 1922, and completed a master's degree in 1923 at Columbia University.

== Career ==
Shearer began teaching in her hometown during her teens. She was a founding member of the executive committee of the Columbia County Teachers' Association in 1912. In 1914, she began teaching at a normal school in Superior, Wisconsin.

Shearer left Wisconsin to be assistant superintendent of schools in Butte, Montana from 1917 until she resigned to protest school board policies in 1921. In 1922, she moved again, to Long Beach, California, where she was supervisor of kindergarten and elementary teachers in the public schools. She also taught at summer teacher training programs in Utah, and at UCLA.

Shearer took a leave from Long Beach schools in 1928 to work on a textbook about reading. In the mid-1940s she was first vice-president of the California School Supervisors Association. She was president of the University Women's Club of Long Beach, and represented the club in 1947 at the national conference of the AAUW, held in Texas. In 1949 she was chair of an interracial women's public affairs committee at the YWCA in Long Beach.

== Publications ==
- "The Cafeteria as an Integrating Activity" (1930, with Blenda Butts)
- "Reading Made a Vital Activity" (1931, with Ruth Berry)
- "The Environment: A Contributing Factor to Growth in Concepts and Skills" (1939)
- Wings for Reading (1942, with Carol Hovious)

== Personal life ==
Shearer died in 1967, at the age of 84, in Kenosha.
