= Martin Scherer =

German physician

Martin Scherer (* born 27 July 1972 in Marburg) is a German university professor and specialist for general practice and primary care. He is director of the Department of General practice and Primary care and head of the Division of Primary Medical Care at the University Medical Center Hamburg-Eppendorf. Since 2019 president of the German College of General Practitioners and Family Physicians (DEGAM) and since 2006 speaker of the Clinical Guidelines Committee.

== Biography ==
Scherer underwent his medical education in Marburg, Vienna and Paris from 1993 to 1999, and after completing his training as a specialist in General Practice and Primary Care in 2004, he worked as a researcher in the Department of General Practice and Primary Care at the University of Göttingen until 2009, from 2006 as a senior physician. In 2009, Scherer was appointed to the W2 professorship 'Health Services Research and its Methods' as deputy director at the Institute of Social Medicine at the University of Lübeck.[ Also in 2009, he was a founding member and deputy spokesperson of the Academic Centre for Population Medicine and Health Services Research. Since 2011, Scherer has been Director of the Institute and Polyclinic of General Practice and Primary Care, University Medical Center Hamburg. From 2015 to 2020, he was also editor of the Hamburger Ärzteblatt. Since 2020, he has been co-host of the podcast 'EvidenzUpdate' of the Ärztezeitung, which deals with the classification of new scientific evidence for clinical practice. In 2019, Martin Scherer (Hamburg) was elected President of the DEGAM. He succeeded Erika Baum (Marburg), who was honoured with the Federal Cross of Merit in 2023 for her commitment to general practice. Eva Hummers and Jean-François Chenot have been Vice Presidents since 2019. During his presidency, Martin Scherer has championed the topics of digitalisation, climate change and health in general practice, among others. Two corresponding DEGAM sections were founded in 2022. In 2023, under the leadership of Martin Scherer, DEGAM presented ten 'Lessons learned from the pandemic' and thus developed recommendations to make the German healthcare system more resilient in the face of future pandemics. Since June 2024, Scherer has also been the spokesperson for the Centre for Health Care Research & Public Health at the UKE.

== Scientific contribution ==
One focus of Scherer's scientific work is the development of quality indicators in the context of healthcare research methods. The aim here is the measurability of quality in healthcare with the help of quality indicators that are developed for this purpose. Scherer also worked on systematic reviews and meta-analyses. As spokesperson for the DEGAM's permanent guideline commission, Scherer was involved in the development of guidelines. Another focus of Scherer's work is multimorbidity. As part of the Chronic Disease Score study, a multimorbidity index was developed and validated that can be used to assess the disease burden of chronically ill patients in Germany based on medication data. In his role as Co-Principal Investigator (Co-PI), Scherer, together with Hendrik van den Bussche (Principal Investigator), developed the MultiCare Claims Study funded by the Federal Ministry of Education and Research (BMBF). This addressed the question of whether the approach according to which individual illnesses and their interactions are more relevant for multimorbidity or whether it is less the illnesses and more the subjective consequences for the patient. Also in the role of co-principal investigator, Scherer worked together with Wolfgang Maier on the AgeCoDe study for dementia and was principal investigator of the RECODE study for heart failure.

Finally, Scherer deals with overuse, underuse and target supply. During the Covid pandemic, he worked on important questions regarding vaccination readiness, the nocebo effect, consequences for the care system and the management of chronic diseases. As co-PI of the GETFEEDBACK-GP study, Scherer, together with Bernd Löwe (Principal Investigator), was able to publish a high-ranking RCT on depression screening and subsequent feedback procedures in general practice. Martin Scherer's scientific oeuvre comprises over 400 Medline-listed publications.

== Memberships in scientific organisations ==
- Member of the scientific advisory board of the AQUA- Institute on Applied Quality Improvement and Research in Healthcare
- Member of the scientific advisory board of the Versorgungsatlas of the Central Research Institute of Ambulatory Health Care
- President of the German Society for General Practice and Family Medicine (DEGAM)
- Speaker of the Centre for Health Care Research and Public Health (CHCR & PH) of the UKE
- Member of the Board of Trustees of the German Foundation for General Practice and Family Medicine (DESAM)
- Chairman of the Expert Advisory Board of the Health Knowledge Foundation
- Member of the Association of the Scientific Medical Societies in Germany (AWMF)

== Awards ==
2009 and 2018 Dr. Lothar Beyer Award for research in General Practice and Primary Care

== Publications ==
PubMed List of Publications

- Chenot, J.-F., & Scherer, M. (Hrsg.). (2021). Allgemeinmedizin. Urban & Fischer Verlag/Elsevier GmbH.
- Hierdeis, H., & Scherer, M. (Hrsg.). (2018). Psychoanalyse und Medizin: Perspektiven, Differenzen, Kooperationen. Vandenhoeck & Ruprecht.
- Scherer, M., Berghold, J., & Hierdeis, H. (Hrsg.). (2020). Medizinische Versorgung zwischen Fortschritt und Zeitdruck: Auswirkungen gesellschaftlicher Beschleunigungsprozesse auf das Gesundheitswesen. Vandenhoeck & Ruprecht.
- Scherer, M., Berghold, J., & Hierdeis, H. (Hrsg.). (2021). Klimakrise und Gesundheit: Zu den Risiken einer menschengemachten Dynamik für Leib und Seele. Vandenhoeck & Ruprecht.
