= Conrad Shearer =

American politician

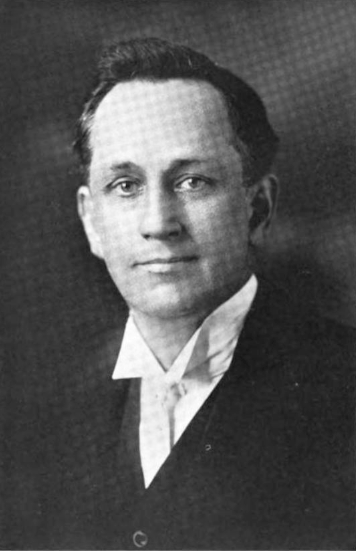

Member of the Wisconsin Senate from the 22nd district
- In office 1929–1948
- Preceded by: George W. Hull
- Succeeded by: William Trinke

Personal details
- Born: October 18, 1873 Somers, Wisconsin, U.S.
- Died: October 8, 1948 (aged 74) Kenosha, Wisconsin, U.S.
- Party: Republican
- Relations: Elga Meta Shearer (sister)
- Website: Official bio

Conrad Shearer (October 18, 1873 – October 8, 1948) was an American politician and businessman.

Born in Somers, Wisconsin, Shearer went to University of Wisconsin–Milwaukee and taught school. Shearer then worked for the United States Post Office in Kenosha, Wisconsin. He then became manager of the Kenosha local trade industry association. He served on the Kenosha Common Council 1913-1915 and on the Kenosha City Park Commission. In 1923, he served in the Wisconsin State Assembly as a Republican. He then served in the Wisconsin Senate from 1929 until his death in 1948. He died in Kenosha, Wisconsin.
