= John D. Shearer =

American photographer

John D. Shearer is a freelance photographer.

His work has been published in numerous publications including Rolling Stone, Spin, Paste, Signal to Noise Magazine, People, Teen People and Vanity Fair.

Shearer graduated from Ball State University in 2003 with a B.A. in photojournalism and telecommunications.

While his work has mostly centered on still photography, he has directed and produced a handful of short films as well. The Jingo Factor which he wrote, directed and produced, and which headlined the 2004 Oranje festival in Indianapolis. It is an experimental propaganda film that centered on events directly after September 11, 2001. Shearer is he an associate member of the American Society of Media Photographers.
