= David Shearer (minister) =

Australian Presbyterian minister (1832–1891)

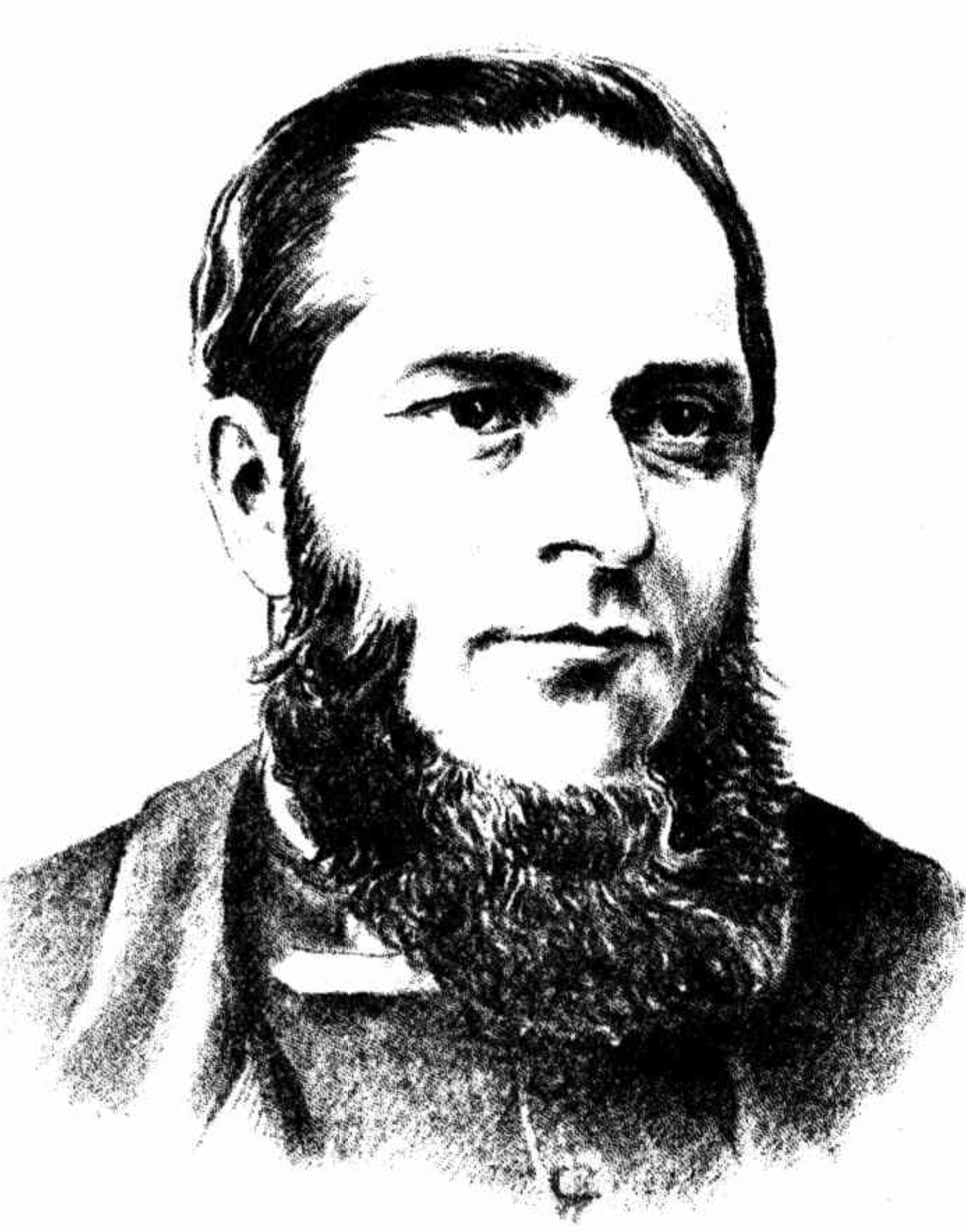
Shearer in 1888

David Shearer (1832 – 13 November 1891) was a minister of religion in England and Western Australia, regarded as the founder of the Presbyterian Church in that State.

== History ==
Shearer was born in Canisbay, near Wick, County Caithness, Scotland. He served as a teacher in Free Church of Scotland schools in Fordyce and Canibrook. He graduated Master of Arts at Edinburgh University in 1867, then served as minister of the English Presbyterian Church at Gateshead, England from 1872, having been licensed as a preacher in 1871. In 1879 he was sent to the colony of Western Australia to establish the Presbyterian Church there.

The first services were held in St George's Hall, then at the Working Men's Institute. In December 1880 land was purchased on Pier Street, Perth for a church building, and the foundation stone laid in October, 1881. Under his direction further churches were founded at Fremantle and Albany.

He was also for some time a member of the Perth Local Board of Education.

He was noted for his hard work and dedication, and was highly respected by members of all faiths. He died after a long and painful illness, and was interred in a family vault in the Presbyterian Cemetery, East Perth.

David Shearer and his wife Margaret F. Shearer (c. 1837 – 14 June 1909) had three sons and five daughters; the eldest, Elizabeth Grace Shearer, married Rev. John Virtue McNair, of Geelong, on 11 November 1885. The fourth daughter Christina Kate married Arthur Morris Oliphant of Scotland on 8 April 1903. They had a home on Stirling Street, Perth.
