= Augustus Shears =

The Reverend Augustus Shears (25 July 1827 - 25 May 1911) was the sixth and youngest son of Daniel Towers Shears (1784–1860), a partner of James Shears and Sons, and Frances Spurrell (1788–1834), daughter of John Spurrell of Bessingham, Norfolk.

Born in Wimbledon, he was educated at Rugby and St John's College, Cambridge, and in 1851 was ordained a deacon in the Church of England.

After serving as Curate of the parishes of Lutterworth, Leicestershire (1851–1853), Escrick, Yorkshire (1853–1855), and Abbots Langley, Hertfordshire (1855–1859), he worked as a missionary in Moulmein, Burma (1859–1862), where he set up a school and translated part of the Book of Common Prayer into Burmese.

Having returned to England due to ill health, he became Curate of Ardingly, Sussex (1862–1864), Heathfield, Sussex (1864–1866), Southover, Sussex (1866–1868), and then St. Bartholomew's, Chichester, Sussex (1868–1873). He then went on to become Vicar of Sileby, Leicestershire (1873–1894), and later Rector of Black Notley, Essex (1894–1907).

He died at Southsea on 25 May 1911.

On 2 May 1861 Augustus Shears married Annie Williams, daughter of the missionary Rev. Jackson Muspratt Williams (who died in Madras in 1832 aged 30) and sister of Major General Jackson Muspratt-Williams (1831–1901), and had three children, the eldest of whom, Augustus Jackson Shears, went on to become a barrister at the Middle Temple.

Augustus Shears was a cousin of Rev. Ernest Henry Shears and Rev. Frederick Spurrell.
