= David Ratcliff (priest) =

Anglican priest and archdeacon (1937–2024)

The Venerable David Ratcliff
- Archdeacon of Scandinavia and Germany
- Church: Anglican
- Archdiocese: Scandinavia and Germany
- Appointed: 1996
- Retired: 2005
- Predecessor: Gerald Brown
- Successor: Mark Oakley

Personal details
- Born: 11 March 1937
- Died: 3 December 2024 (aged 87)

David William Ratcliff (11 March 1937 – 3 December 2024) was an English Anglican priest and Archdeacon of Scandinavia and Germany.

Ratcliff was born on 11 March 1937. He was educated at Edinburgh Theological College and was ordained in 1963. After curacies in Croydon and Selsdon, he was Vicar of Milton Regis from 1969 to 1975. He worked in the Diocese of Canterbury's Education Department from 1975 to 1991 before serving as rector in Frankfurt am Main within the Convocation of Episcopal Churches in Europe and as chaplain in Stockholm within the Diocese of Europe between 1991 and 2002.

He was also Archdeacon of Scandinavia and Germany from 1996 until his retirement in 2005.

Ratcliff died on 3 December 2024, at the age of 87.
