= James Shears and Sons =

British coppersmiths, 18th–19th centuries

- Type: Private company
- Industry: Coppersmith
- Predecessor: William Gore, Gore & Shears
- Founded: c. 1785
- Founder: James Shears
- Defunct: 1891
- Fate: Sale of its assets by order of the mortgagees
- Headquarters: London, England
- Area served: London
- Key people: James Shears and his sons
- Products: Copper vats for beer making
- Owner: Shears family

James Shears and Sons was a firm of London coppersmiths and braziers who were active from c1785 to 1891. The firm was founded by James Shears (c1750-1820) and continued by his two sons Daniel Towers Shears (1782–1860) and James Henry Shears (1788–1855) and subsequently by William Shears.

== The origins of the company ==
James Shears was born in about 1750, the son of Thomas Shears (1709–1778) and Sarah Towers (? – 1766). He was baptised at All Saint's Church, Ockham, Surrey, on 2 September 1750. James Shears was married to Ann Pitcher on 16 June 1772 at St Giles-without-Cripplegate, London. His death on 25 June 1820 at the age of 70 is recorded in the Morning Chronicle, 26 June 1820.

He entered the copper trade at the age of about 12, probably in the workshop of the coppersmith William Gore. Gore first appears in London directories in 1768 with premises at Fleet-ditch (an earlier name for Fleet Market). In 1770 the first mention occurs of William Gore at 67 Fleet-market, the address at which the company was to remain until at least 1822.

By 1779 Gore had taken James Shears into partnership and the firm became Gore & Shears. In about 1785 Gore either retired or died and Shears continued the business in his name alone. Both Gore and Shears were members of the London livery company, the Worshipful Company of Armourers and Brasiers. In 1799 he was elected to the Corporation of the City of London as Councillor for the ward of Farringdon Without.

In 1810 Shears and his sons still appear to have been resident in the Fleet Market premises at Fleet Market, but at the time of his death James Shears had a house at The Oval, Kennington.

Much of the company's business at this period appears to have been as suppliers to the brewing trade, especially of the copper vats used in beer-making process. They also manufactured boilers for steam engines and so established close and enduring links with the Birmingham firm of Boulton and Watt, the leading manufacturers of steam engines. Several instances are known of Boulton & Watt recommending Shears to customers who had purchased an engine and required a suitable boiler. Later the company also had connections with the sugar refining industry as evidenced by the patent granted to Daniel Towers Shears in 1850 (see below) and his subsequent connection with the Glucose Sugar and Colouring Co Ltd.

== Premises ==
The company's original premises which were taken over from William Gore were at 67 Fleet Market. The company was still at this address in 1822 (when a fire broke out at the premises described as extending "from the west side of the Market to Shoe-lane").

By this time Fleet Market was becoming increasingly dilapidated and by 1834 at the very latest Shears & Co had acquired freehold property at 27 Bankside on the Southwark bank of the Thames. This remained their main base for the rest of the company's existence.

However, the evidence of contemporary directories and newspaper items shows that during its existence the company occupied other sites in and around London at one time or another including 22–24 Fleet Market (in 1811 where they had a lease on property that was due to expire in 1813); 25 Fleet Market (in 1815); 60 Lower Shadwell (also in 1815). They had copper rolling mills at Merton, Surrey (where they were in possession by 1815 and continued there until 1867): in 1819 they obtained a steam engine to power these mills from Boulton and Watt.

In 1867 the company's property included the copperworks, two wharves, an engineering works and other adjacent premises at Bankside, the copper mills at Merton and manufacturing premises at New Park Street, Southwark.

== Daniel Towers Shears ==
Daniel Towers Shears appears to have been responsible for the day-to-day running of the company by 1810. During his career he took out a number of patents, all clearly related to the business of copper and brass manufacture or to industries which used utensils made of these materials:

- 1817 Machine to cool liquids, e.g. in the process of distillation or brewing. (This has been described as the first true heat-exchanger)
- 1824 Manufacture of zinc (with his brother James Henry Shears and Frederick Benecke)
- 1830 Apparatus for distilling (subsequently described as "a bad imitation of the Pistorius still")
- 1845 Production of ingots of zinc from ores
- 1847 Treatment of zinc ores to produce ingots
- 1850 Manufacture and refining of sugar
- 1853 Improvements in brewing

In 1842 Daniel Towers Shears married his second wife, a Maria Dickenson; at the time he was living at The Lawn, South Lambeth and this was still his home at the time of his death in 1860. Maria Shears died in 1862.

== James Henry Shears ==
James Henry Shears, the younger of the two brothers, appears to have had a more adventurous streak than his older brother. In the 1820s, during a period of national economic euphoria, he speculated in a number of concerns which often had little connection with the company's core business. In some of these his brother was also a partner, but probably only in a passive capacity.

The first of these was the Real del Monte Company which was formed in 1824 by John Taylor (1779–1863), the mining engineer and entrepreneur, to operate silver mines in Mexico. Shears was closely involved and one of the directors of the company. Another company formed by Taylor later in the same year was the British Iron Company: Shears was one of three managing directors, together with Taylor and Robert Small, until 1826 when he was obliged to resign as a result of dissatisfaction among the shareholders at the management of the company.

Also in 1824 Shears formed the Llangennech Coal Company to work the coal under an estate to the east of Llanelli in south Wales. This estate had been leased from Edward Rose Tunno (1800–1863), a rich young man whose income was derived from British and Welsh real estate purchased from his inheritance from his father, John, and uncle Adam, traders of South Carolina. In this concern Shears was joined by his brother and by two London merchants, Thomas Margrave and William Ellwand. The property included the derelict Spitty copperworks which the Shears brothers (on their own) proceeded to re-open in 1824. The following year, on the opposite bank of the river Llwchwr, they built a new zinc works at Loughor (or possibly re-activated an existing one) where they intended to produce zinc using the recently granted patent of 1824. These two enterprises were obviously intended to be complementary to one another in providing the materials required for the manufacture of brass, part of the core business of James Shears & Sons.

Shears, Margrave and Tunno further collaborated in acquiring mining property in Cornwall in 1825; Shears is also believed to have had interests in copper mining in north Wales.

The copper and zinc works proved unsuccessful. The zinc works was offered for sale in 1825 almost as soon as it had been completed and the copperworks closed in 1831. Copper prices had fallen steeply since 1825 and the Llangennech Coal Company was proving more costly than had been expected since difficulties were being experienced in reaching coal in a new pit that had been started in 1825. Despite this the partners in the Coal Company, with seven others, formed the Llanelly Railway & Dock Co in 1827 to build a new deep-water dock in Llanelli and a railway to connect it to the new pit then in the process of sinking. An Act of Parliament was obtained in 1828 (9 Geo. 4 c. xci) but work on the railway and dock did not start until after coal had been proved in the pit in June 1832. Shortly afterwards, in December 1832, the Shears brothers withdrew from the Coal Company but James Henry Shears retained an interest in the coal industry, becoming involved with the Broadoak colliery at Loughor in 1834.

A likely factor contributing to Shears' disengagement from the Llangennech Company was the situation in which the affairs of the British Iron Company were then placed; this must have required much of his attention and finance. Immediately after its formation the company had invested heavily in taking out mineral leases, in setting up new ironworks and in buying new ones. Following dissatisfaction among the shareholders Shears was compelled to resign as a director in 1826 but he continued as one of three trustees of the company's property. The most serious issue concerned the Corngreaves estate near Dudley in the west Midlands for which the company had paid an excessive price at a time of high iron prices in 1825. Following a collapse in the market Shears and his fellow trustees commenced legal action to have the contract revised. The case with appeals lasted from 1826 until 1838; the final result was against the company and led eventually to its collapse.

At the time of his death in 1855 James Henry Shears lived at Streatham Hill.

== Later history of the Company ==
Following the death of Daniel Towers Shears a dispute concerning his estate arose between Frances Shears (probably his daughter) and his wife's family, the reasons for which are not clear. His assets were ordered to be sold by the Court of Chancery and a series of sales took place in 1867 of the premises of the company and its stock, stores and equipment.

Whatever the outcome of these sales the company continued to trade under its original name and was controlled by Daniel's son William Shears. It remained at 17 and 27 Bankside, described as coppersmiths, engineers and millwrights, until 1891 when a sale of its assets by order of the mortgagees took place. No subsequent reference to the company has been found.

== Daughters of James Shears ==
As well as his two sons who succeeded to the management of the business, James Shears had several daughters, three of whom married brewers, which demonstrates how close the relationship between coppersmiths and brewers was. Rebecca Shears (1786-1861) was married to James Spurrell (1776–1840) and Hannah Shears (1790–1882) to Charles Spurrell – James and Charles were brothers and members of the Spurrell family of Norfolk; they were also senior employees at the Anchor Brewery, Southwark. As a widow Rebecca married George Cosier Fletcher. James Shears's youngest daughter, Lydia (1794–1855), was married to John Gray (1791–1826) of the Gray and Dacre Brewery, West Ham, Essex.

As further evidence of the close relationship between the coppersmiths of the Shears family and the brewers of the Spurrell family, James Shears's eldest son Daniel Towers Shears married Frances Spurrell, the youngest sister of James and Charles Spurrell (so three Shears siblings married three Spurrell siblings). Furthermore, Rebecca, the eldest daughter of James Spurrell and Rebecca Shears, went on to become the wife of another important brewer, James Watney.

== Descendants of James Shears ==
- Frederick Spurrell (1824–1902), clergyman, grandson
- Augustus Shears (1827–1911), clergyman, grandson
- James Watney (1832–1886), politician, great-grandson
- Flaxman Charles John Spurrell (1842–1915), archaeologist, great-grandson
- Herbert Watney (1843−1932), physician, great-grandson
- Ernest Henry Shears (1849–1917), clergyman, grandson
- Herbert Wrigley Wilson (1866–1940), writer, great-great-grandson
- Herbert George Flaxman Spurrell (1877–1918), biologist, great-great-grandson
- Katherine Watney (1870–1958), missionary, great-great-granddaughter
- Constance Watney (1878–1947), missionary, great-great-granddaughter
- Athelstan Jasper Blaxland (1880−1963), surgeon, great-great-grandson
- Philip James Shears,(1887–1972), army officer, great-great-great-grandson
- Arthur Joseph Wrigley (1902–1983), physician, great-great-great-grandson
