= Frederick Spurrell =

Frederick Spurrell (2 August 1824 – 23 February 1902) was an Anglican priest and archaeologist.

== Early life and education ==
Frederick Spurrell was born at 23, Park Street in Southwark at a time when his father, Charles Spurrell (1783–1866), was employed by Barclay, Perkins & Co. as a senior manager at the nearby Anchor Brewery. His mother, Hannah Shears (1790–1882), was the daughter of the London copper merchant James Shears. In the 1830s the family moved to Anchor Terrace on Southwark Bridge Road.

He studied at King's College London and was awarded an Associateship (A.K.C.), before going up to Corpus Christi College, Cambridge, where he obtained a B.A. in 1847 (promoted to M.A. in 1850). At university he was a member of both the Cambridge Camden Society and the Cambridge Architectural Society.

== Career and interests ==
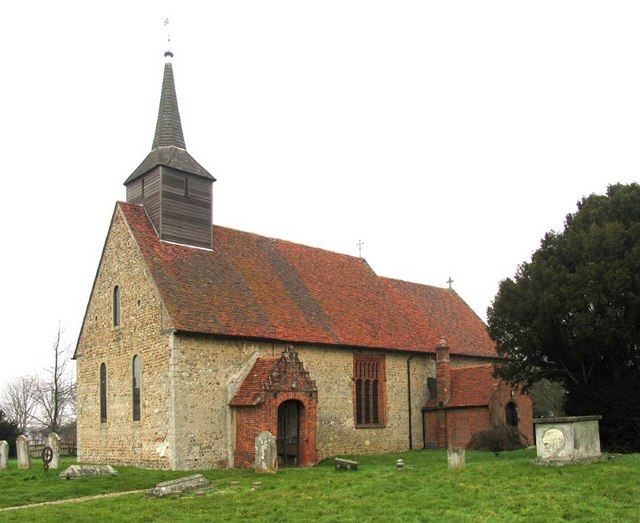
St Germanus' Church, Faulkbourne, where Spurrell was rector from 1853 to 1898.

Spurrell was ordained deacon by the Bishop of Chichester in 1847 and priest the following year, when he began his work as curate of Newhaven, Sussex. While there, he was among a small party of local officials that called on Louis-Philippe I, who had fled to England following the 1848 revolutions in France.

In 1849 Spurrell travelled through Belgium, Prussia and Denmark to Sweden, having been sent by the Bishop of London, the Rt. Rev. Charles James Blomfield to serve as the Anglican chaplain in Stockholm. He provided weekly services in the upper gallery of a chapel at 12 Lilla Trädgårdsgatan, which had been loaned by the Moravian Church. Following his return to England, he served as curate of Barcombe, Sussex, from 1850 to 1853.

Spurrell was appointed rector of Faulkbourne, Essex, in 1853, where he remained until his retirement in 1898, having been made a surrogate in the Diocese of St Albans in 1894. In 1886 he commissioned Arthur Blomfield to restore the parish church.

Spurrell was a keen amateur archaeologist who published a number of papers. He was a member of the Essex Archaeological Society and the Sussex Archaeological Society, and also served on the Council of the Royal Archaeological Society alongside prominent Victorian archaeologists such as Augustus Pitt Rivers and Flinders Petrie.

He died in Bath in 1902 and was buried in the churchyard of St Germanus' Church, Faulkbourne.

== Family ==
Spurrell married his cousin, Frances Gray (1827–1892), at Newhaven on 16 February 1854. Frances's father, John Gray (1790–1826), had founded the Gray and Dacre Brewery in West Ham, Essex, and her mother, Lydia Shears (1794–1855), was the youngest daughter of the copper merchant James Shears.

They had two sons (one stillborn) and three daughters. Their surviving son, the Rev. Charles Henry Spurrell, was for many years as Organising Secretary of the National Society for Promoting Religious Education and later served as Rector of Meesden, Hertfordshire, from 1911 to 1923.

Frederick Spurrell was descended from the Spurrell family of Norfolk. He was the uncle of the archaeologist and egyptologist Flaxman Charles John Spurrell and a cousin of the Rev. Augustus Shears and the Rev. Ernest Henry Shears.

== Publications ==
The following is a list of some of Frederick Spurrell's published works:

- On the Architecture of Fletching Church, Sussex Archaeological Collections, Vol. IV (1851)
- Roman Remains Discovered at Newhaven in 1852, Sussex Archaeological Collections, Vol. V (1852)
- Architectural Relics of Lewes Priory, Sussex Archaeological Collections, Vol. VI (1853)
- Inventory of the Goods of Cornelius Humphrey, of Newhaven, 1697, Sussex Archaeological Collections, Vol. VI (1853)
- Examples of Mediaeval Seals. Seals Preserved at Wisby in Gottland, Archaeological Journal, Vol. VII (1855)
- Notice of a Wooden Effigy of a Priest in the Church at Little Leighs, Essex Archaeological Society Transperiodical (1867)
- Faulkbourn Church, Essex Archaeological Society Transperiodical (1878)
- Notes on the Death of King John, Archaeological Journal (1881)
