= All Saints Church, Thurgarton =

Coordinates: 52.8763°N 1.2398°E

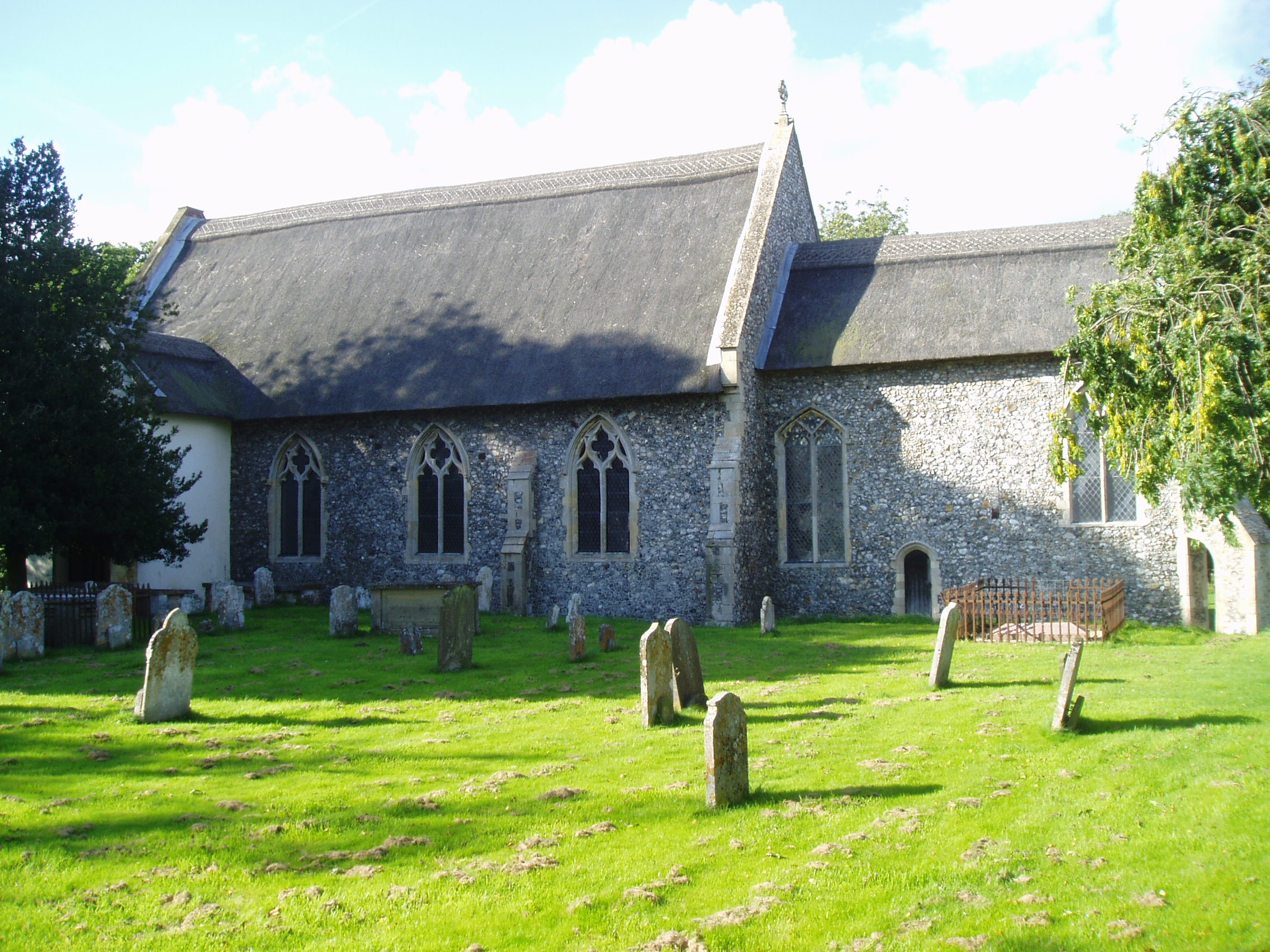
- All Saints' Church, Thurgarton, from the south

- Location in Norfolk
- OS grid reference: TG 181 359
- Location: Thurgarton, Norfolk
- Country: England
- Denomination: Anglican
- Website: Churches Conservation Trust

Architecture
- Functional status: Redundant
- Heritage designation: Grade I
- Designated: 4 October 1960
- Architectural type: Church
- Style: Gothic, Gothic Revival
- Groundbreaking: 14th century
- Completed: 1924

Specifications
- Materials: Flint, thatched roof

All Saints' Church is a redundant Anglican church in the village of Thurgarton, Norfolk, England. It is recorded in the National Heritage List for England as a designated Grade I listed building, and is under the care of the Churches Conservation Trust. The church stands in an isolated position on a crossroads north of the village, 6 miles (10 km) south of Cromer, to the west of the A140 road.

== History ==
The church dates from the 14th century. The west tower fell in 1882, and was replaced by a vestry at the west end in 1924. The roof was re-thatched in 1984–85.

== Architecture ==
=== Exterior ===
All Saints' is constructed in flint and has a thatched roof. Its plan consists of a three-bay nave, a south porch, a chancel and a west vestry. In the west wall of the nave are two lancet windows. Along the south wall are three two-light windows dating from the 19th century in Decorated style. On the north side is one similar window and a doorway. In the south wall of the chancel are a two-light window with Y-tracery, a priest's door, and a late medieval two-light window. The east window has three lights and dates from the 19th century. At the southeast corner of the church is a buttress through which is a passage. The south porch has two storeys, with the bell sited in the upper storey.

=== Interior ===
The nave roof is scissor braced, and the chancel roof is a hammerbeam. In the church are the remains of a rood stairway. The interior of the church is notable for its medieval benches with carved ends. The carvings include poppyheads, an elephant, barrels, mythical beasts, a man, a lion, and fighting dogs. On a wall are the remains of painted texts. Also in the church are a 19th-century fretwork screen, and communion rails with balusters. The font is medieval with an 18th-century cover.

== See also ==
- List of churches preserved by the Churches Conservation Trust in the East of England
