= Anchor Terrace =

Grade II listed building in Southwark

Coordinates: 51.5068°N 0.0950°W

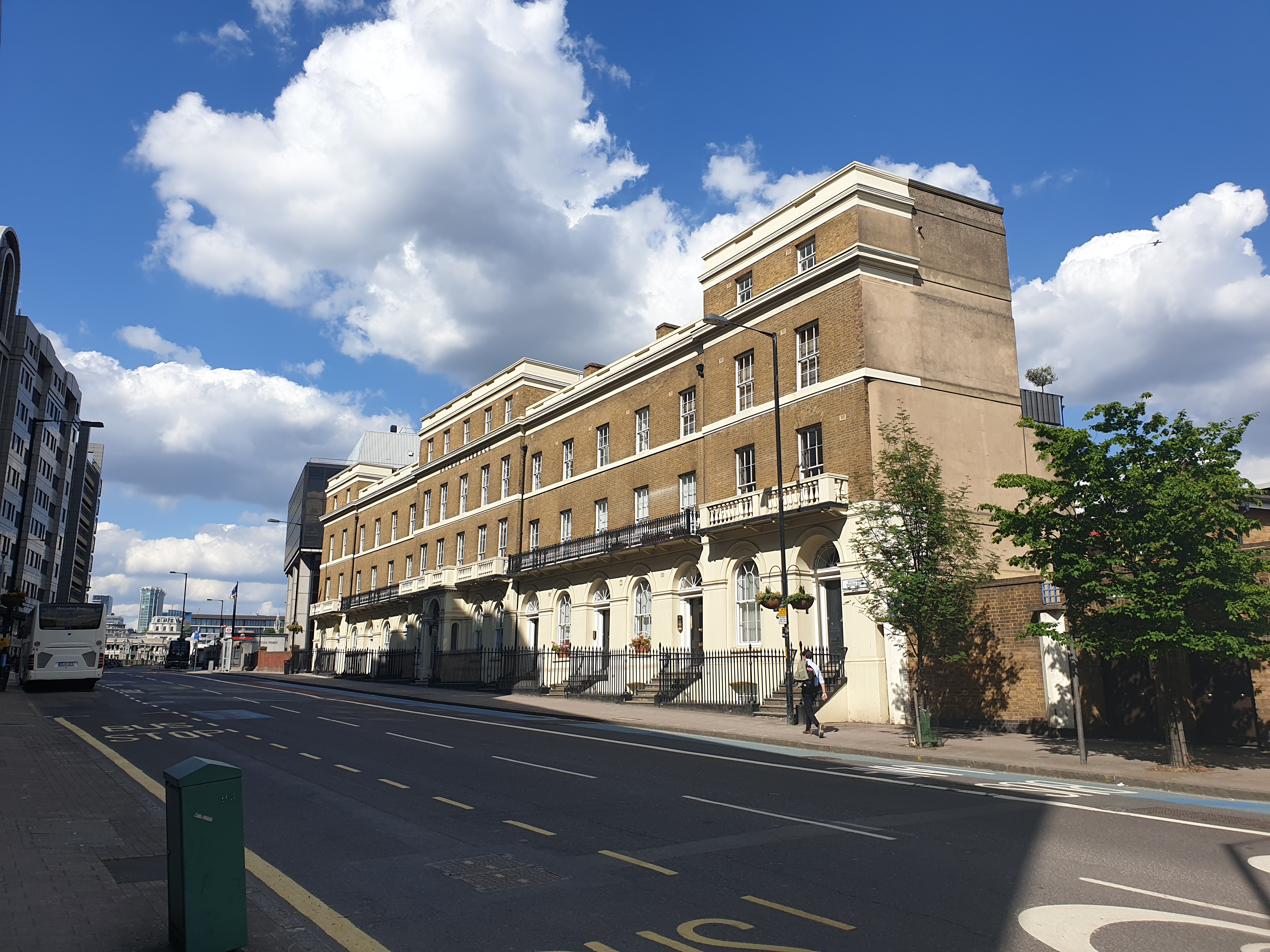
Anchor Terrace.

Anchor Terrace is a large symmetrical building on the east side of Southwark Bridge Road in London, situated very close to the River Thames. It was built in 1834, and its original inhabitants were senior employees of the nearby Anchor Brewery, Southwark, which was then owned by Barclay Perkins & Co. Ltd. The building was later used as the brewery's offices. It overlooks the site of the former brewery.

It originally comprised eight residences, and above the door to the centre of the building are written the words "Anchor Terrace". Among the original residents were the brewer John Hoy Waterman and Charles Spurrell (1783–1866), a member of the Spurrell family of Thurgarton, Norfolk, who, along with his brother, James Spurrell (1776–1840), was employed at the Anchor Brewery.

It was discovered that Anchor Terrace stands on the site of the original Globe Theatre after part of the foundations were found underneath the car park to its rear. However, as Anchor Terrace itself is a grade II listed building, there may never be a full excavation of the site.

The BBC television drama series This Life was partly filmed there.

The building was converted into luxury flats in the late 1990s.
