= Spurrell =

Family name

Spurrell is a surname found in Norfolk, Wales and other parts of the United Kingdom, as well as in various countries around the world.

== Origins ==
It has been suggested that the name of the Norfolk family is derived from the village of Sporle, near Swaffham. In 1349 a William de Sporle was admitted freeman of the city of Norwich and later sat on the committee that considered the creation of the office of Mayor of Norwich. Spurrells were resident in Norwich from the fifteenth century onwards, and in 1737 John Spurrell was elected mayor of the city.

== Thurgarton branch ==
Spurrells are recorded in Thurgarton, near Cromer, from the early 1500s and may have settled there from Norwich. A William Sporrell is listed on the Subsidy Roll in 1522, and the Thurgarton parish records show several generations of the family from 1539 onwards. The Spurrell family (the change in spelling from Sporrell to Spurrell occurred in the mid-16th century) owned several hundred acres of land in Thurgarton, Bessingham, Sustead, Gresham and Erpingham.

In 1733 William Spurrell, the first of four generations named William to serve as Chief Constable of North Erpingham hundred, rebuilt Thurgarton House in the Georgian style. A Victorian wing and several brick barns were built in the nineteenth century. The house remained in the Spurrell family until 2014.

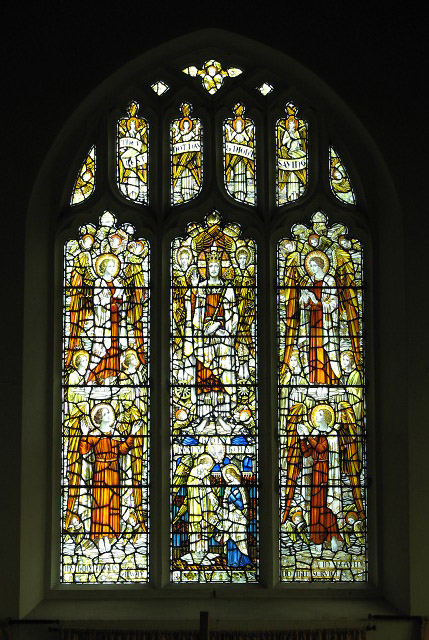
The east window of St Mary's church, Bessingham, installed in memory of Lt.-Col. Robert John Spurrell.

In 1894 John Thomas Spurrell, the younger son of Richard James Spurrell of Thurgarton House, inherited several thousand acres in Horsham St Faith and Newton St Faith, near Norwich, from Barbara, Countess von Rechberg (daughter of Thomas Jones, 6th Viscount Ranelagh, and the estranged wife of the Austrian statesman Count Johann Bernhard von Rechberg und Rothenlöwen). In the 1930s part of the estate was requisitioned for the construction of RAF Horsham St Faith, which in 1963 became Norwich International Airport.

== Bessingham branch ==
In 1766 John Spurrell, the younger son of William Spurrell who built Thurgarton House in 1733, purchased land in neighbouring Bessingham from the Anson family. The Spurrells expanded the estate, benefiting from the enclosure of the common land in the 1820s, and in 1870 Daniel Spurrell built a new Manor House, with lawns, a walled garden and parkland laid out around it. Daniel's daughter Katherine Anne Spurrell bred daffodils in the grounds of the Manor House, some of which received the Award of Merit from the Royal Horticultural Society, and the daffodil Narcissus 'Katherine Spurrell' was named after her by Edward Leeds. Another famous resident of the Manor House in the late nineteenth century was a bear, brought to Bessingham from India by Daniel's son Robert John Spurrell, a cavalry officer who had rowed for the University of Cambridge in the 1878 boat race.

The Bessingham estate included farms in Roughton, Billockby and Sidestrand (including Sidestrand Hall, which was sold to Sir Samuel Hoare in 1880) and was eventually broken up and sold in 1970. The Manor House now operates as self-catering holiday accommodation.

== Prominent Spurrells ==
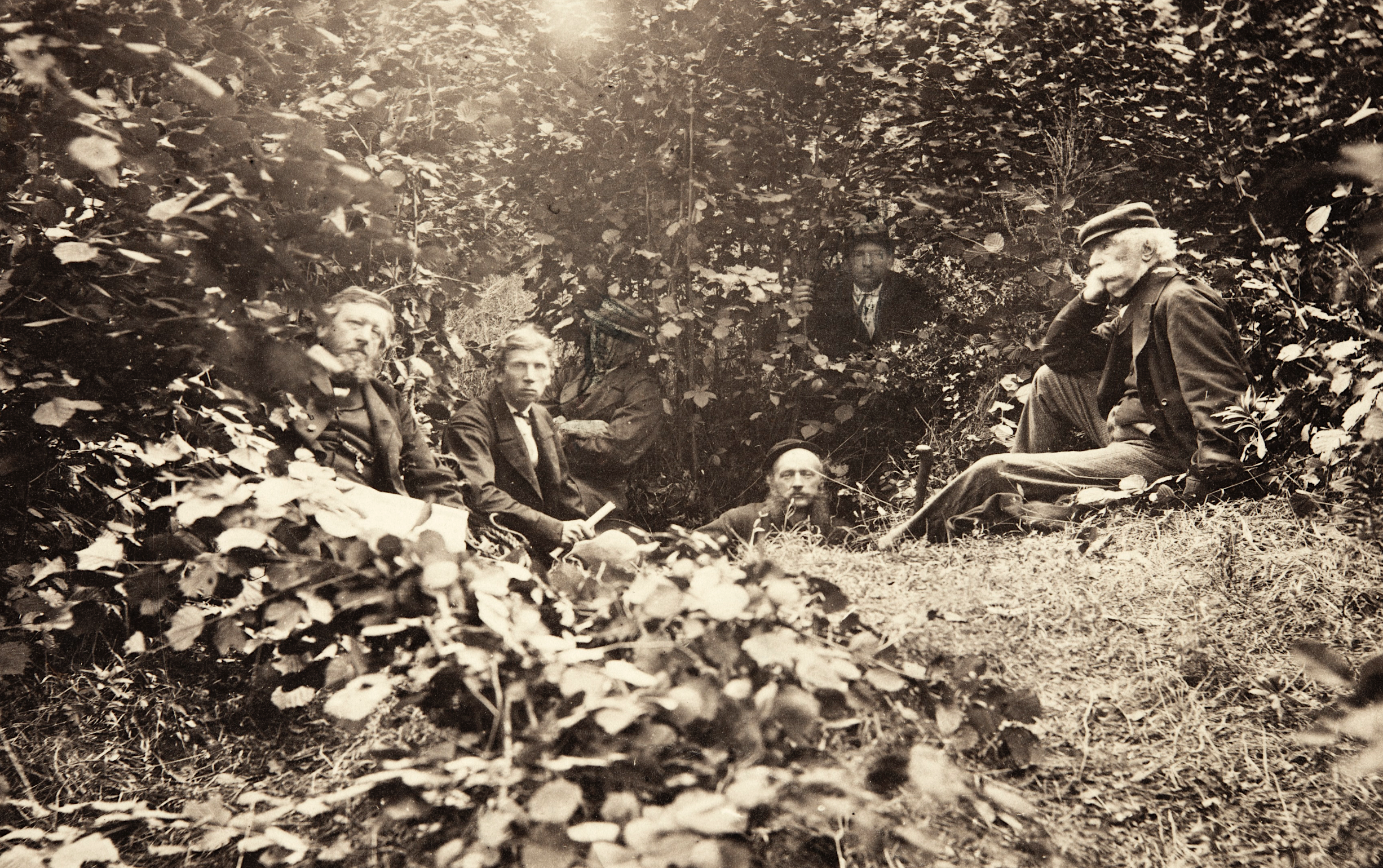
Flaxman Charles John Spurrell, second from the left, outside a denehole in Kent.

Through marriage with other North Norfolk families such as the Bacons, Flaxmans and Copemans, the Spurrells became prominent members of the local gentry, serving on local and parish councils. Some members of the family achieved wider recognition:

- Helen Spurrell (1819–1891), who published the first translation of the Old Testament by a woman in 1885
- Rev. Frederick Spurrell (1824–1902), Chaplain in Stockholm (1849), and Rector of Faulkbourne, Essex (1853–1898)
- Flaxman Charles John Spurrell (1842–1915), archaeologist, Egyptologist and early photographer
- Katherine Anne Spurrell (1852-1919), daffodil breeder and wife of Flaxman Charles John Spurrell
- Herbert George Flaxman Spurrell (1877–1918), biologist, author and physician

In the early nineteenth century the family also had links to various London breweries, which were cemented through marriage (Watney's Stag Brewery in Victoria, the Gray and Dacre Brewery in West Ham, and the Anchor Brewery, Southwark), as well as to the coppersmiths James Shears and Sons.

== Other Spurrell families in England and Wales ==
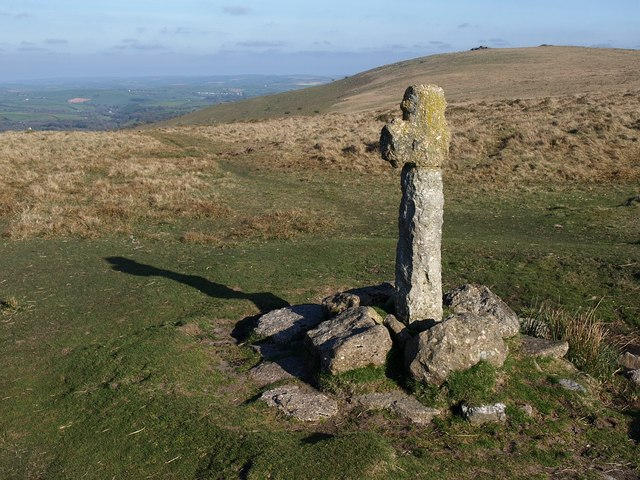
Spurrell's Cross, Dartmoor.

It is not known whether there is any connection between the Norfolk families and those living in Wales and the West Country. There were Spurrells in Devon in the sixteenth century, so any migration would be difficult to prove due to the lack of early records.

Spurrell's Cross on Dartmoor marks the spot where the path used by monks to travel from Buckfast Abbey to Plympton Priory met the path from Wrangaton to Erme Pound.

In the late eighteenth century John Spurrell, an auctioneer from Bath, moved to Wales and settled in Carmarthen. He was the grandson of Robert Spurrell, a Bath schoolmaster who printed the first book, The Elements of Chronology, in the city in 1730. In 1840, a printing press was set up in Carmarthen by William Spurrell (1813–1889), who wrote a history of the town and compiled and published a Welsh-English dictionary (first published 1848) and an English-Welsh dictionary (first published 1850). Today's Collins Welsh dictionary is known as the "Collins Spurrell".

A street developed by a local housing authority in Carmarthen is named Heol Spurrell in honour of the family.

Kate Florence Spurrell was a trade unionist from Devon who stood as a Labour Party candidate in Totnes in the 1924 and 1929 general elections and in Camborne in the 1931 and 1935 general elections. Another Labour politician, Emily Spurrell, was elected Merseyside Police and Crime Commissioner in 2021.

== Miscellaneous ==
Spurrell Avenue in Bexley, Kent, is named after Flaxman C. J. Spurrell.

The Spurrell Charitable Trust makes donations to local causes in Norfolk.
