= Ernest Shears =

The Reverend Ernest Henry Shears (1849, Streatham – 20 February 1917, Stafford) was an Anglican clergyman in South Africa.

Ernest Henry Shears was the ninth son of James Henry Shears (1788–1855), a partner of James Shears and Sons, and Mary Mann (1810–1893). He was educated at King's College London and St John's College, Cambridge, and in 1871 was ordained a deacon in the Church of England.

After being ordained, he went to Natal in South Africa, where he became Archdeacon of Durban (1887–1892).

He then returned to England and eventually retired to Stafford, where he died on 20 February 1917.

On 14 January 1875 Ernest Shears married Mary Seawell Boulger, by whom he had three children, one of whom, Cuthbert Shears, also entered the Church.

He was a cousin of Rev. Augustus Shears and Rev. Frederick Spurrell.
