= British Iron Company =

The British Iron Company was formed in 1824 to smelt and manufacture iron and to mine ironstone, coal, etc. It was re-formed as the New British Iron Company in 1843 and liquidated itself in 1892.

== British Iron Company (1824-1844) ==
The company was formed late in 1824 by John Taylor (1779–1863), the mining engineer and entrepreneur. His close associates in the venture were the coppersmith James Henry Shears (who was also associated with him in the Real del Monte Company formed earlier the same year) and Robert Small, a merchant, both of London. The capital which the company proposed to raise was £2,000,000, a high figure, but one which reflected the financial euphoria of the time. There was no lack of subscribers to the undertaking.

The purpose of the company was stated as being to smelt, manufacture and sell iron; to work iron mines; and to purchase ores from other sources as required. During 1825 the company purchased a number of active ironworks or land on which to build. Of these the principal sites were Abersychan in south Wales, Ruabon in north Wales and Corngreaves near Dudley in England. Following the downturn in the economy that set in 1825 the price of iron then fell, funds became tight, and investors who had made an initial payment for shares were either unable or unwilling to meet further calls. The value of shares in the company fell throughout 1825 and 1826 and by the summer of 1826 there was dissatisfaction among the shareholders at the management of the company. It was claimed that properties had been purchased for sums in excess of their true value, that mineral leases had been taken on terms that were burdensome, and that excessive sums of money had been spent on developing these sites. The available evidence points to a lack of financial acumen and practical experience on the part of the managers.

The situation was exacerbated by a pamphlet written by Richard Cort, the son of Henry Cort and cashier of the company until his resignation in February 1826. It protested at the way in which the company's business was being managed, and was critical of the management. Following a number of ill-tempered meetings of the subscribers, Taylor and Shears resigned as directors in October 1826 and a new board was elected. The capital of the company was reduced from £2m to £1m, reducing the liability of the subscribers for further calls. Among the new directors was David Mushet who was also appointed manager. Taylor and Shears, together with Small, continued as trustees of the company's property.

Under the new board the company's prospects improved; even so, over the fifteen years 1826-40 it made a cumulative net profit of only £129,116 on a paid-up capital of £955,205, or 0.09 per cent per annum. It was hampered by heavy royalties and other charges, especially at Abersychan and Corngreaves, from agreements that had been entered into by the company in its formative years. Between 1826 and 1838, also, it was engaged in litigation with the owner of the Corngreaves estate which ultimately went against the company (see below). The suitability of Mushet was questioned at the time of his appointment as managing director in 1826: while he enjoyed a reputation as a metallurgist, Mushet had little practical experience of managing a large ironworks. The company secretary, Harry Scrivenor, a professional ironworks manager, had had little success in this area and is best remembered for his writing. Accusations of incompetent management continued to be made by the shareholders.

Following the adverse judgment given in the Corngreaves case the affairs of the company were thrown into disarray. Its already unhappy position was further exacerbated by the severe recession of the early 1840s. Dissension developed between a faction of shareholders and the directors, with subscribers resisting the payment of further calls on their shares and urging that the company be dissolved in order to release them from future financial liability. After several angry meetings it was finally resolved in September 1841 that the company should be dissolved after the liquidation of all its liabilities. In the meantime operations continued as normal.

Officials and child employees of the British Iron Company were examined by the Royal Commission on Children's Employment of 1841-2 including Richard Wood, manager of Ruabon, William Wood, manager of Abersychan, and other officials at both sites. The report of the commissioners contains much detailed information on working conditions in the company's plants. Employment conditions in the Company's mines in the West Midlands were described in the first report of the Midland Mining Commission of 1843.

British Iron Company Act 1840
- Act of Parliament
- Parliament of the United Kingdom
- Long title: An Act for granting certain Powers to the British Iron Company.
- Citation: 3 & 4 Vict. c. xcvi

Dates
- Royal assent: 3 July 1840

Text of statute as originally enacted

== New British Iron Company (1843-1892) ==
British Iron Company Act 1843
- Act of Parliament
- Parliament of the United Kingdom
- Long title: An Act to enlarge the Powers granted by an Act of the Fourth Year of Her present Majesty, intituled "An Act for granting certain Powers to the British Iron Company," and to facilitate the Sale of the Estates and Properties belonging to the said Company.
- Citation: 6 & 7 Vict. c. cx

Dates
- Royal assent: 24 August 1843
Other legislation
Amends	British Iron Company Act 1840

Text of statute as originally enacted

New British Iron Company Act 1844
- Act of Parliament
- Parliament of the United Kingdom
- Long title: An Act for granting certain Powers to "The New British Iron Company."
- Citation: 7 & 8 Vict. c. xxx

Dates
- Royal assent: 23 May 1844

British Iron Company (Winding Up) Act 1844
- Act of Parliament
- Parliament of the United Kingdom
- Long title: An Act to facilitate the Settlement of the Affairs of the British Iron Company.
- Citation: 7 & 8 Vict. c. xlvi

Dates
- Royal assent: 4 July 1844

Thanks to the personal intervention of a number of shareholders, the old company was saved from the otherwise inevitable liquidation that it faced and the transfer of its assets to the New British Iron Company was authorised by act of Parliament, the British Iron Company Act 1843 (6 & 7 Vict. c. cx) in August 1843. All the assets of the old company were sold to the new company for £200,000 and it was finally wound up in 1844 by the British Iron Company (Winding Up) Act 1844 (7 & 8 Vict. c. xlvi).

The new company was a more modest undertaking with a capital of £400,000. It remained on a secure financial footing for most of its existence and came to enjoy a high reputation within commercial circles. A contributory factor was the policy of divesting the company of its less profitable properties and concentrating activities on a few core sites. Thus Abersychan was sold to the Ebbw Vale Company in 1852. At about the same time Plas Isa in Ruabon, north-east Wales was sold to Samuel Giller and Netherton to Noah Hingley & Sons. Hingley also acquired Dudley Wood, in the English Midlands, a few years later. Following the closure of the Ruabon ironworks in 1887 operations were confined to Brierley Hill and Corngreaves in England.

The company was registered as a limited liability company in 1883 with a nominal capital of £600,000. In 1887 it went into voluntary liquidation but this was reversed in 1890 after arrangements had been made with the creditors. Plans were then prepared for a reconstruction of the company and the modernisation of the works at Corngreaves, but when the necessary additional capital was not forthcoming the debenture holders petitioned for the appointment of a receiver. A winding-up order was made in June 1892 but in September the company resolved to go into voluntary liquidation. The company continued to trade while arrangements were made for the disposal of its assets. Attempts to sell the entire Corngreaves estate as a single concern were unsuccessful, but the ironworks itself was eventually bought by the former general manager in 1894 while Noah Hingley & Sons bought the rights to the trademarks and goodwill of the company.

== Sites ==
=== Wales (South) ===
==== Abersychan ====
A 60-year lease of property at Abersychan near Pontypool, Monmouthshire was granted in August 1825. The royalties specified in the agreement were exceptionally high. Construction started in 1826 and after a number of constructional mistakes and difficulties the first iron was produced and sold the following year. Six furnaces were built but they were never all in production at once. Nevertheless, output rose to a level that was above the average for south Wales at the time. From about 1840 the works switched from producing bar iron to making rails. The site was sold to the Ebbw Vale Company in 1852 and remained active until 1889. An engine-house, office block and remains of the furnaces can still be seen. The adjacent hamlet named British is all that remains of the housing that was once occupied by the workers at this site. The New British Iron Company retained some property in this area until 1885.

===== References =====
- Colebrook, Kim (Spring 1983). "A History of the British Ironworks, Abersychan". Gwent Local History (54). Gwent Local History Council: 6–29., Welsh Journals, National Library of Wales
- Michael Atkinson and Colin Baber, The Growth and Decline of the South Wales Iron Industry 1760-1880 (Cardiff : University of Wales Press, 1987, pp 24, 59-61, 94-5

==== Abercraf ====
A small ironworks had been established at Abercraf, Breconshire in 1824 by the local coalowner, Thomas Harper. Its purpose was to exploit two patents granted to Harper and his fellow coalowner, John Christie (also owner of the Brecon Forest Tramroad) in 1823 (no 4848) and 1824 (no 4909) for the use of the local anthracite coal in smelting. The British Iron Company bought the works in 1825 for £19,541 and at the same time leased minerals on the nearby mountain, Cribarth. The venture soon proved unsuccessful and the furnaces were blown out in 1826 after it was discovered that production costs greatly exceeded the selling price. Coal continued to be worked from the taking; it was still in production in 1841 when the local agent gave a statement to the Children's Employment Commission.

===== References =====
- Paul Reynolds, 'Some uses for culm: two patents from the upper Swansea valley', South West Wales Industrial Archaeology Society, Bulletin, 92 (2005) pp 9–14
- Alan Birch, The Economic History of the British Iron and Steel Industry 1784-1879 (London : Cass, 1967), pp 169–70, 204

==== Cwmgwrelych ====
A lease of mineral property close to the head of the Neath Canal at Glynneath, Glamorgan was taken in 1825. The original intention was to erect ironworks but this plan was abandoned and the company concentrated on producing coal and ironstone for sale. The first significant shipments on the canal were made in 1827 and they continued until about 1837. The company retained a wharf at the seaward end of the canal at Giant's Grave, Briton Ferry until 1877 but no further payments are recorded for tonnage on the canal.

===== References =====
- D. R. Phillips, The History of the Vale of Neath (Swansea : 1925), pp 252–4, 307-8

==== Aberystruth ====
The company spent £15,975 in 1825 on freehold lands in the parish of Aberystruth in the valley of the Ebwy Fach in Monmouthshire but no further information has been found.

=== Wales (North) ===
==== Ruabon ====
The company's principal works in north Wales, generally known as the Ruabon works, were located at Acrefair, near Wrexham, Denbighshire. An ironworks was established here in c1817 by Edward Lloyd Rowland. Following his bankruptcy in 1822 the works were idle until bought by the British Iron Company in 1825 for nearly £135,000 (which included the purchase of the Newbridge works). There were three furnaces, forges and mills which supplied foundry iron chiefly to the Manchester market. From about 1875 the production of iron was spasmodic until the final closure of the works in December 1887. The company also had collieries in the area, including Acrefair, Plas Benion and Wynnstay (or the Green Pit). Following the withdrawal of the New British Iron Company from this district the collieries were taken over by the Wynnstay Collieries Company.

==== Newbridge ====
A small ironworks at Newbridge, south of Ruabon, appears to have been in existence in 1809. It was acquired by the British Iron Company in 1825 together with the Acrefair site and comprised a forge and a mill. A small quantity of manufactured goods were produced there in 1825 but work was then suspended pending repairs. In 1839 the British Iron Company was still in possession but the single furnace was not in blast.

==== Plas Issa ====
An ironworks at Plas Issa, Ruabon, was listed as the property of the British Iron Company in 1847. It was sold to Samuel Giller in about 1852-4.

=== England (West Midlands) ===
The British Iron Company owned five ironworks in England all of which lay within a few miles of each other to the south of the town of Dudley in the West Midlands. They seem to have been managed as a single unit.

==== Corngreaves ====
Corngreaves was the company's principal site in this region. It was built on freehold property acquired from John Attwood (the brother of Thomas Attwood) to the south of Cradley Heath. The purchase price of £550,000 was approved by Taylor, Shears and Small as managing directors and trustees for the company in June 1825 and the purchase was completed in October 1825. However, by this time the market in iron had collapsed and the company started legal proceedings to have the contract set aside. Even before completion the directors instituted proceedings to recover the down payment of £238,525 on the grounds that they had been misled by Attwood as to the true value and prospects of the estate. The case against Attwood for perjury was heard in February 1828 and he was found not guilty. The trustees then commenced a further action in 1830 to have the contract set aside and this resulted in a verdict in their favour in November 1832. Attwood then appealed to the House of Lords where a final verdict in his favour was given in March 1838. The contract stood and the company were liable for payment in full. This long-running action excited much interest in legal and commercial circles on account of both its length and its cost.

The Company's original intention had been to erect six furnaces on the site but by 1847 only two had been built. This number had increased to four by 1854 and six by 1860. Steel making commenced in 1884 and in subsequent years the plant was much modernised. The New British Iron Company continued to operate the works until 1894 when it was bought by a former general manager following the liquidation of the New British Iron Company. Production then continued under subsequent owners until 1912. Both the British Iron Company and the New British Iron Company operated a number of collieries on this property: in 1894 there were six working collieries.

==== Brierley Hill ====
In 1825 the Company purchased ironworks at Brierley Hill from its previous owner, following his failure, for £20,760. It was located on the banks of the Dudley Canal and produced about 150 tons of iron per week and 10 tons of steel. It remained the property of the New British Iron Company until the company was wound up in 1892.

==== Dudley Wood ====
The British Iron Company acquired the ironworks (with four furnaces, forges and rolling mills) from Attwood in 1825. It was connected to Corngreaves by a recently built private railway. It was acquired by Noah Hingley & Sons in about 1860.

==== Netherton ====
The 'old ironworks' at Netherton (with two furnaces) were acquired from Attwood in 1825 as part of the Corngreaves transaction. The company remained in possession until c1852 when the works were sold to Noah Hingley & Sons. The company is also known to have worked coal mines here.

Brierley Hill, Dudley Wood and Netherton were all held under lease from the Dudley estate.

==== Withymoor ====
The British Iron Company acquired Netherton Furnaces at Withymoor, Netherton in 1825 when two furnaces were in blast. By 1839 it was in the possession of James Griffin, who already owned 'Withymoor Works' at the same location, where, in 1813 and 1814, he had minted token coins bearing the names 'Withymoor Scythe Works' and 'James Griffin & Sons'.

Francis Northall is listed as manager in 1835 Pigot's Directory of Worcestershire.

== Sources ==
Three contemporary pamphlets by Richard Cort contain much information on the early years of the Company, although by a not entirely disinterested author:

A Letter to the shareholders of the British Iron Company, showing the past and present losses of the speculation : with suggestions to realize the future profit of the concern (London : 1826)

A second letter to the shareholders of the British Iron Company : introductory to evidence and proofs to relieve the proprietors from the ruinous contract for Corngreaves (London : 1829)

A third letter to the shareholders of the British Iron Company introductory to evidence and proofs to relieve the proprietors from the ruinous contract for Corngreaves; also various documents and information shewing the critical state of the company's affairs and how to obtain a remedy for the past and security for the future (London : 1829)

The protracted legal proceedings regarding the Corngreaves estate were reported at length in the contemporary press, including The Times and the Morning Chronicle, as were the controversial meetings of shareholders held during the crises of 1826 and 1841.

The fullest modern account of the Company, although with a distinct bias towards its activities in north Wales, is by Ifor Edwards, 'The British Iron Company', Denbighshire Historical Society Transactions, 31 (1982), pp 109–48; 32 (1983), pp 98–124

For the dates of operation of the various sites, the number of furnaces at each and the number in blast on a year by year basis, see Philip Riden and John G. Owen, British blast furnace statistics, 1790-1980 (Cardiff : Merton Priory Press, 1995)
