= Flaxman Charles John Spurrell =

Archaeologist and geologist

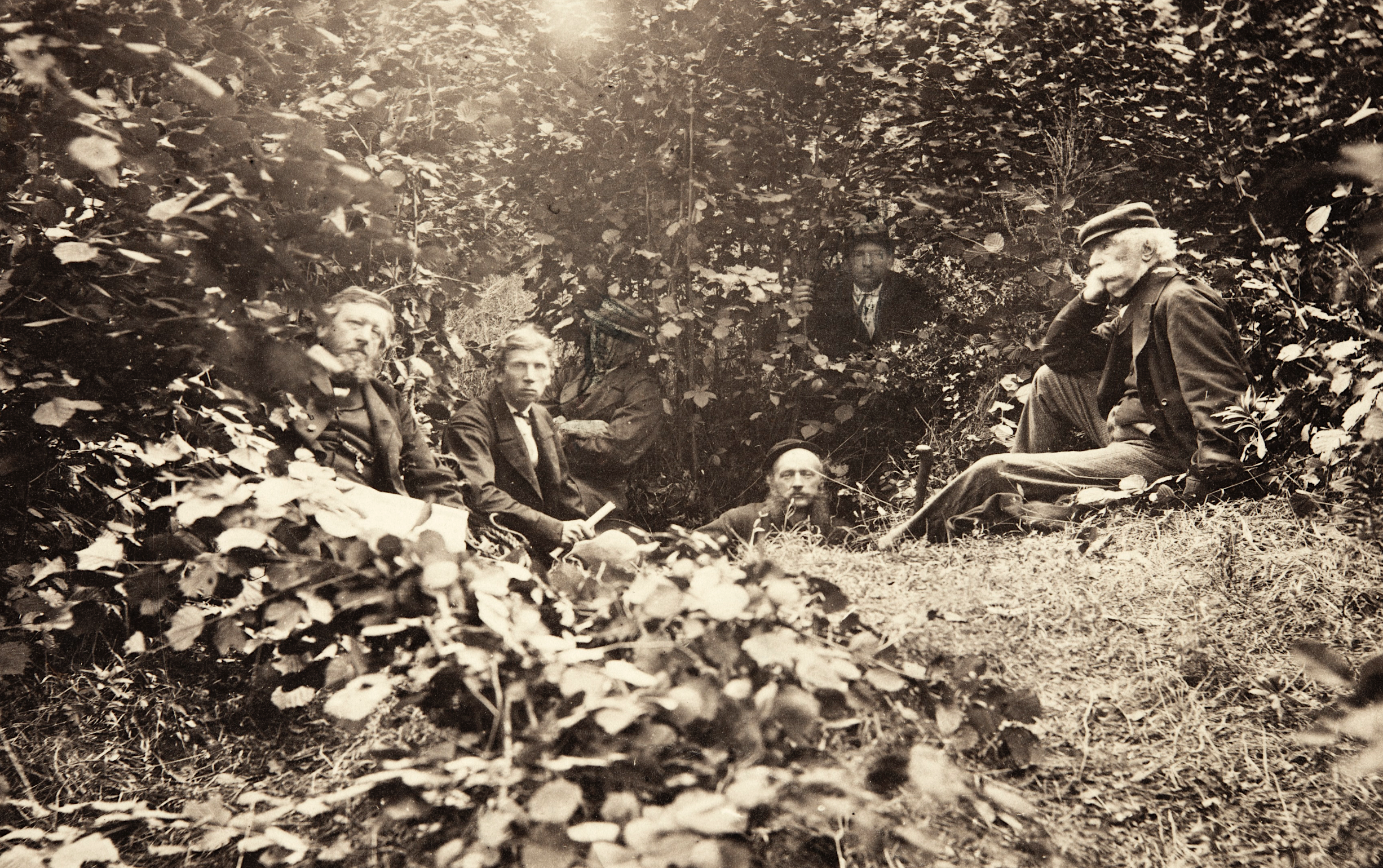
F. C. J. Spurrell (second from left) and his father, Flaxman Spurrell (far left), outside a denehole near Bexley, Kent.

Flaxman Charles John Spurrell FSA FGS (8 September 1842 – 25 February 1915) was a British archaeologist, geologist and photographer who worked mainly in Kent and East Anglia. He was also a noted egyptologist, working closely with Flinders Petrie.

== Family and early life ==
Born at Mile End in Stepney, London, Spurrell was the eldest son of Dr. Flaxman and Ann Spurrell and a descendant of the Spurrell family of Norfolk. He was a nephew of the Rev. Frederick Spurrell, a fellow archaeologist, and an uncle of the biologist and author Herbert George Flaxman Spurrell.

Not long after his birth, the family settled at Bexley in Kent, living for many years at The Priory, Picardy Road, Belvedere (later home to the Priory Conservative Club).

Spurrell was educated at Epsom College and went on to study medicine, although he never completed his studies.

== Archaeological work ==
By the late 1850s Spurrell had developed an interest in archaeology and geology in the North Kent area and was encouraged to pursue his interest by his father, who had been a founding member of both the Kent Archaeological Society and the West Kent Natural History, Microscopical and Photographic Society. He began to examine flint implements in and around Crayford and was, according to Nesta Caiger, “the first archaeologist to study fully the many deneholes which were dug in Kent and Essex”, many of which he descended into, examined and photographed. He visited and investigated dozens of other sites, including prehistoric and Roman sites on both sides of the Thames estuary.

Spurrell discovered an Acheulean “chipping floor” at Stoneham's Pit in Crayford and the Middle Palaeolithic site later known as Baker's Hole in the Ebbsfleet Valley. He was the first to publish on the archaeological technique of refitting lithic artefacts, which he called “restoration”. Along with documenting fine-scale artifact distributions, he used refitting to validate the integrity of archaeological context, a technique that gained great popularity 100 years later in the 1980s. In his 1884 article in the Journal of the Anthropological Institute of Great Britain and Ireland, Spurrell used refitting and replication experiments to establish the various differences in “style and method of chipping” with the goal of establishing the evolution of cognition in ancient humans. He also recognized the differences between formal tool production and expedient tool use. These approaches are standard analytical procedures and concepts in Stone Age archaeological studies in the 21st century.

He published his findings in the periodicals of the Kent Archaeological Society, the Essex Archaeological Society and the Royal Archaeological Society, as well as those of other societies and groups.

In the 1870s Spurrell met Flinders Petrie, becoming a trusted friend and collaborator. Over the following decades his attention turned increasingly to egyptology. While Petrie was unable to convince Spurrell to travel to Egypt with him, the objects that Petrie sent back to England were careful studied and catalogued by Spurrell, including important items discovered at Naqada and Tell el-Amarna.

In 1885 and 1889 Spurrell published his theory about the origins of the river Thames' vernacular embankments, described as a "startling suggestion" since shown to be probably correct.

In 1895 he presented a number of prehistoric artefacts to the Natural History Museum in London and later donated material from his personal collection to the museum at Norwich Castle. Some of his photographic images are now held by the Historic England Archive.

== Later life and recognition ==
Shortly after his mother's death in 1896, Spurrell retired to Norfolk, where he resided first with his uncle Daniel Spurrell at the Manor House in Bessingham and later at The Den, another house on the estate. Despite what Petrie called “the entreaties of his friends”, he seldom left Norfolk and his self-imposed retirement.

On 27 March 1912 he married his cousin Katherine Anne Spurrell (1852–1919), a daughter of Daniel Spurrell and a noted daffodil breeder whose cultivars had won the Award of Merit from the Royal Horticultural Society.

Spurrell was a Fellow of the Geological Society from 1868 to 1905 and a Fellow of the Society of Antiquaries from 1899 to about 1910.

Spurrell died on 25 February 1915 in Bessingham and is buried there in St Mary's Churchyard.

When a housing estate was built at Joyden's Wood in Bexley in the 1950s, one of the roads was named Spurrell Avenue in his honour.

== Publications ==
The following papers were published by F. C. J. Spurrell in the Royal Archaeological Society's Archaeological Journal:

- Implements and Chips from the floor of a Palaeolithic Workshop, Vol. XXXVII
- Deneholes and Artificial Caves with Vertical Entrances, Vol. XXXVIII
- Shallow Pits in Norfolk and Elsewhere, Vol. XL
- Early Sites and Embankments on the margins of the Thames Estuary, Vol. XLII
- The First Passage of the Thames by Aulus Plautius, Vol. XLVII
- Shoebury Camp, Essex, Vol. XLVII
- Notes on a Boat found at Albert Dock, Woolwich, Vol. XLVII
- Rude Implements from the North Downs, Vol. XLVIII
- Some Flints from Egypt of the IVth Dynasty, Vol. XLIX
- Notes on Early Sickles, Vol. XLIX
- On Remedies in the Sloane Collections, and on Alchemical Symbols, Vol. LI
- Notes on Egyptian Colours, Vol. LII
- On Some Flint Implements from Egypt and Denmark, Vol. LIII

In Archaeologia Cantiana, the journal of the Kent Archaeological Society, he published:

- Palaeolithic Implements found in West Kent, Vol. XV
- Sketch of the Ancient Architecture of Erith Church, Kent, Vol. XVI
- Dartford Antiquities. Notes on British Roman and Saxon Remains there found, Vol. XVIII

Flaxman Spurrell also published the following articles in the Essex Naturalist:

- Ensilage, or preserving grain in pits (1887)
- Withambury (1887)
- Danbury Camp, Essex (1890)
- Hæsten's Camps at Shoebury and Benfleet, Essex (1890)

In the Proceedings of the Geologists' Association he published the following works:

- Excursion to Erith and Crayford, Vol. IX
- On the Estuary of the Thames and its Alluvium, Vol. XI
- Excursion to Higham, Vol. XI
- Excursion to Crayford, Vol. XI
- Excursion to Swanscombe, Vol XI
- Excursion to Grays, Thurrock, Essex, Vol. XII
- Excursion to Dartford Heath, Vol. XIII
- See also Visit to see F. C. J. Spurrell's collection of fossils in Excursion to Belvedere, J. Morris, Vol. II

The following was published in the Quarterly Journal of the Geological Society:

- Spurrell, F. C. J. (1880). "On the Discovery of the Place where Palaeolithic Implements were made at Crayford". Quarterly Journal of the Geological Society. 36 (1–4): 544–548. doi:10.1144/GSL.JGS.1880.036.01-04.41. S2CID 129657702.

In the Journal of the Anthropological Institute can be found:

- On some Palaeolithic knapping tools and methods of using them, Vol. XIII

The following appeared in the Reports of the West Kent Natural History, Microscopical and Photographic Society:

- A sketch of the history of the rivers and denudation of West Kent (1886)
