= St Peter and St Sigfrid's Church =

Church in Stockholm, Sweden

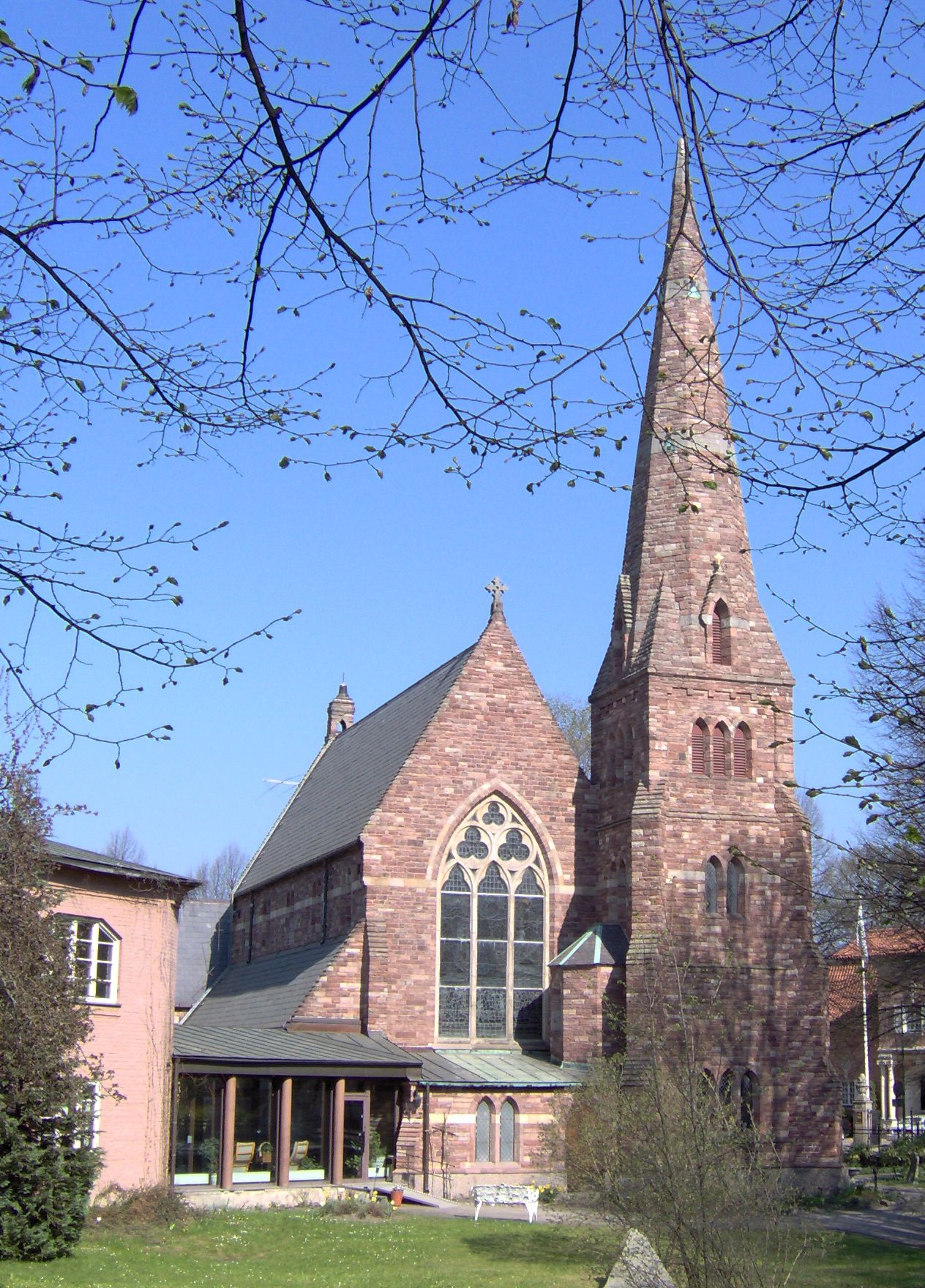
- St Peter and St Sigfrid's Church, Stockholm
- St Peter and St Sigfrid's Church
- 59°19′58″N 18°06′09″E
- Location: Dag Hammarskjöldsväg 14, Stockholm
- Country: Sweden
- Denomination: Church of England

History
- Dedicated: 7 April 1863

Architecture
- Architect(s): Gustavus Hamilton, James Souttar
- Style: Gothic Revival
- Years built: 1863–1866

Administration
- Diocese: Diocese of Gibraltar in Europe

Clergy
- Bishop: Robert Innes

St Peter and St Sigfrid's Church, often referred to locally as the English Church (Swedish: Engelska kyrkan), is an Anglican church in Stockholm, Sweden. It was built in the 1860s for the British congregation in the city and was originally located on Rörstrandsgatan (later renamed Wallingatan) in the Norrmalm district before being moved, stone by stone, to the Diplomatstaden area of Östermalm in 1913.

The church is part of Church of England's Diocese of Gibraltar in Europe and is dedicated to Saint Peter and Saint Sigfrid.

== History ==
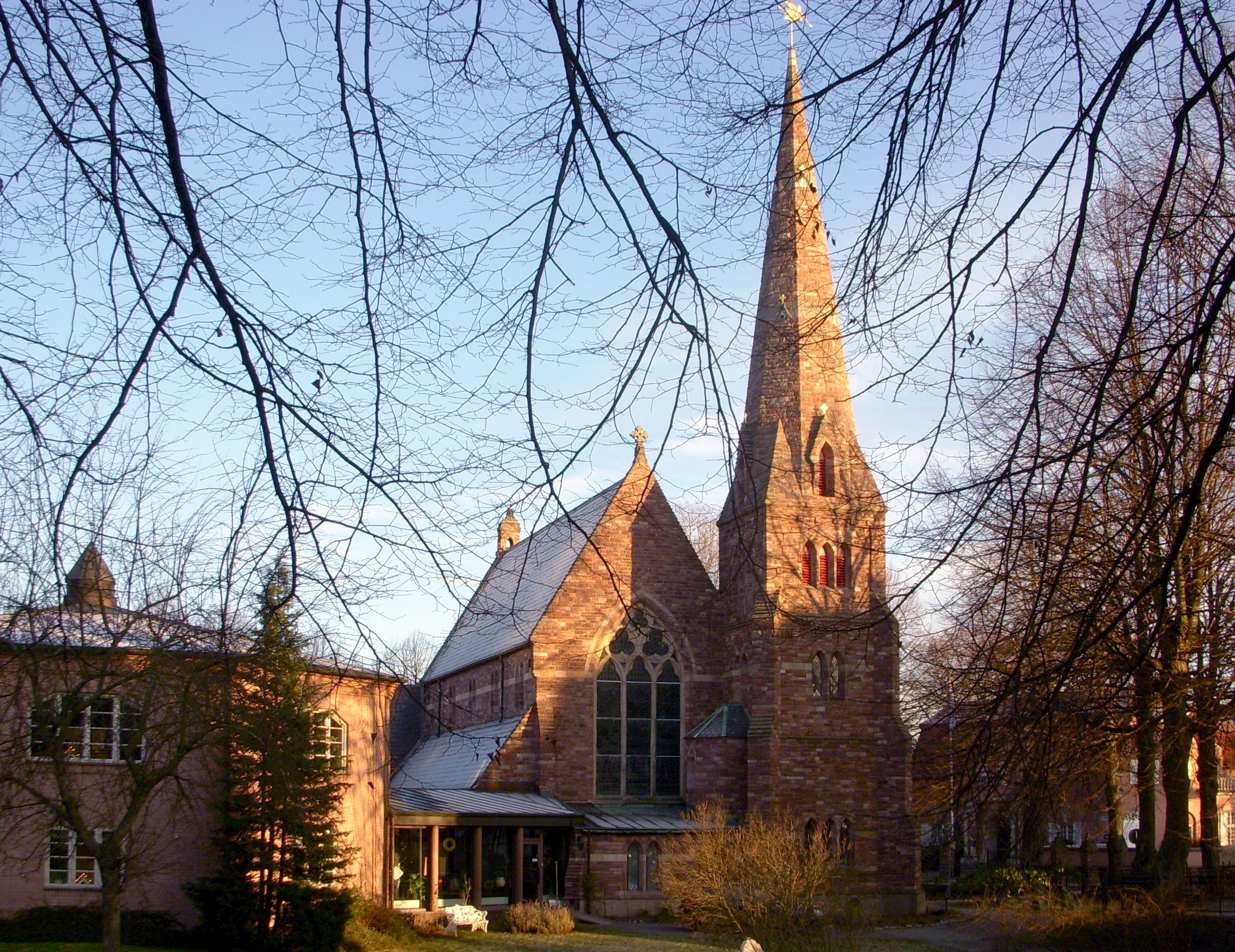
St Peter and St Sigfrid's Church in 2008

Anglican worship in Sweden dates back to 1653, when the first English diplomats were sent by Oliver Cromwell. They brought with them two chaplains, who conducted services at the residence of the ambassador, Bulstrode Whitelocke.

An Anglo-French Huguenot congregation was later formed with a French pastor, who held services in both French and English. In 1741 King Frederick I accepted their petition for the right to worship publicly, since a Swedish church had already been established in Wapping, London.

The church was supported by a poor box into which, until 1871, every English ship captain calling at Stockholm contributed 24 Swedish riksdaler.

In 1842 the Bishop of London, Charles James Blomfield, whose duties included supervising the provision of Anglican services abroad, wrote to the British ambassador in Stockholm, Sir Thomas Cartwright, regretting the lack of Anglican worship available to British residents and visitors in the city and suggesting the appointment of a “regularly ordained clergyman” as chaplain. With the consul, G. J. R. Gordon, and others, Cartwright begin to make the necessary arrangements. A suitable location for services was found on the upper floor of a Moravian chapel at 12 Lilla Trädgårdsgatan.

As the intended appointee, the Rev. George Williams, could not be released from his duties at King's College, Cambridge, the Rev. Frederick Spurrell was sent instead, arriving in Stockholm as the first regularly appointed chaplain in April 1849.

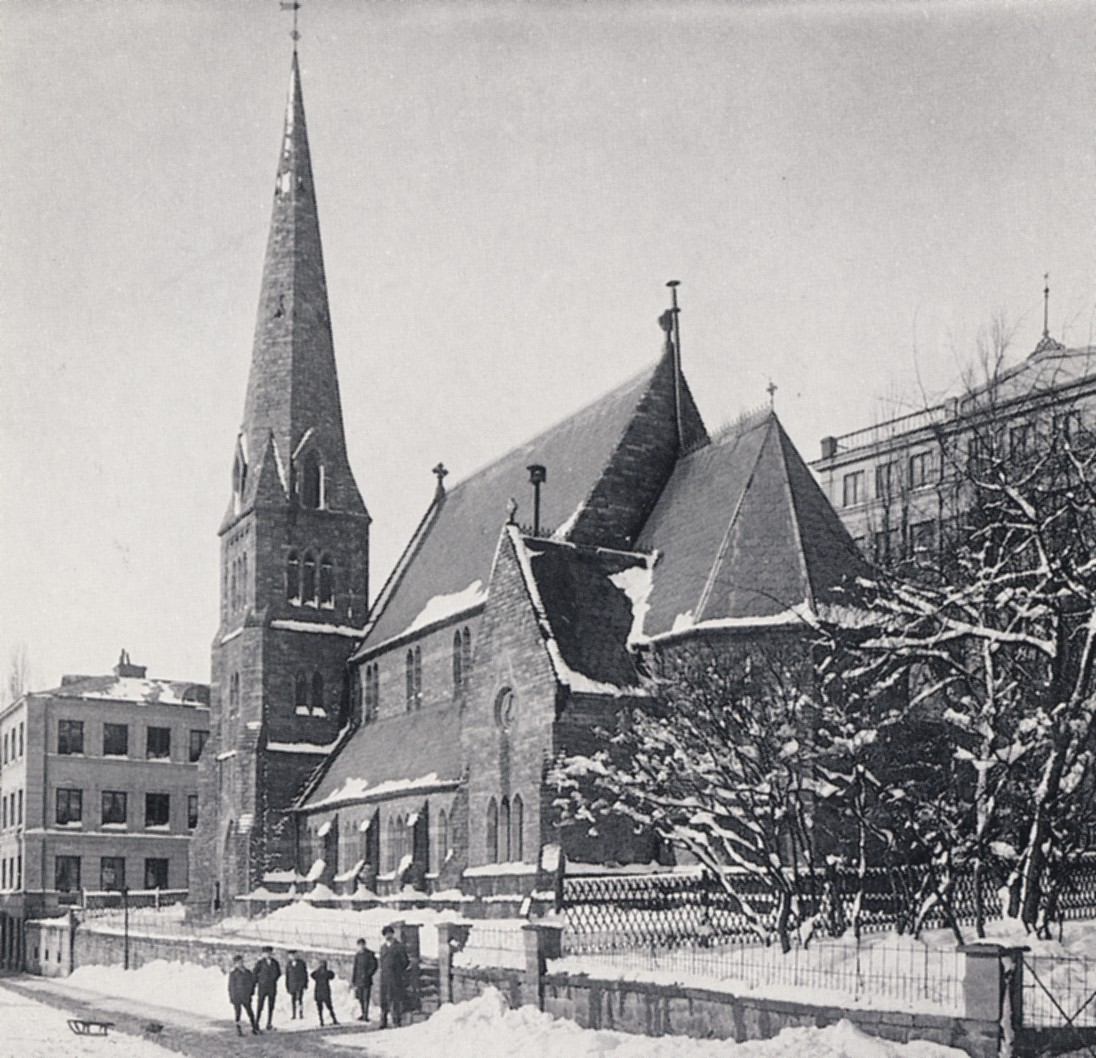
St Peter and St Sigfrid's Church in 1900

A decade later, the congregation began to collect funds for the construction of a church building of its own. A site was purchased on Rörstrandsgatan (later renamed Wallingatan) in the Norrmalm district of Stockholm, and the foundation stone of St Peter and St Sigfrid's Church was laid and dedicated on 7 April 1863. In 1866 the completed church was consecrated by the American Episcopal Bishop of Illinois, the Rt. Rev. Henry John Whitehouse. A number of senior clergymen of the Church of Sweden, including the Archbishop of Uppsala, Henrik Reuterdahl, were present.

The original location being considered unsuitable, the church was moved, stone by stone, to the Diplomatstaden area of Östermalm, close to the British embassy, in 1913 thanks to the efforts of Crown Princess Margaret, a granddaughter of Queen Victoria. The reconstruction, including the addition of a vestry and the extension of the nave, was supervised by the Swedish architect A. E. Melander and took a total of nine months. The site had previously been a garrison cemetery, and a number of old gravestones can still be seen.

== Architecture and furnishings ==
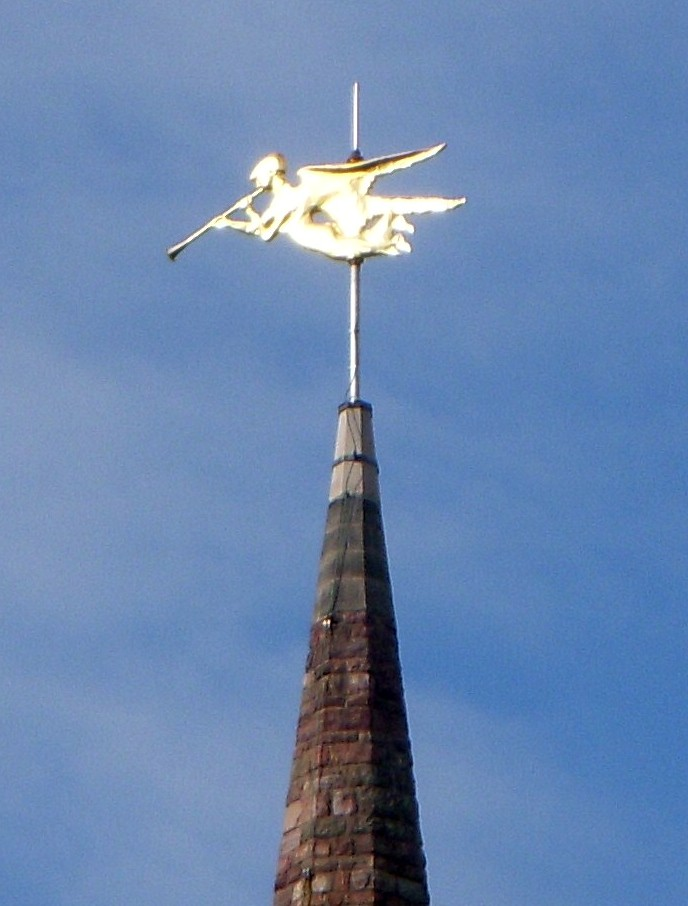
The restored weather vane

St Peter and St Sigfrid's Church was designed by James Souttar and built by Albert Svennson, based on earlier plans drawn up by Gustavus Hamilton. It resembles an English parish church in the Gothic Revival style and is made of sandstone from Södertälje and Motala. The vaults of the tower are built of stone, while the rest of the church is vaulted in wood.

The flying angel weather vane stood on the original church and was recently restored after being damaged in a storm.

The organ was built in 1994 at Ålems Orgelverkstad in Småland and has one manual and ten and a half stops, with 650 pipes.

The church also contains a triptych from Oberammergau, a hanging crucifix dedicated in 1970 and a number of stained glass windows, including the large west window, which is dedicated to Crown Princess Margaret and depicts the life and faith of Saint Margaret of Scotland. Other windows were designed by Morris & Co. and by the Swedish artist Einar Forseth.

The ends of the pews have carved letters spelling out "Adeste fideles, adoremus dominum", the first and last words in Latin of the hymn O Come, All Ye Faithful.

== Chaplains ==
The following have served as Anglican chaplains in Stockholm since 1849:

- 1849: Rev. Frederick Spurrell
- 1855: Rev. William John Mills Ellison
- 1858: Rev. Robert Healey Blakey
- 1873: Rev. Austin West
- 1875: Rev. James Taylor
- 1876: Rev. Arthur Fairbanks
- 1878: Rev. J. H. Smart
- 1879: Rev. William Coombes
- 1880: Rev. Robert Hopkinson Weakley
- 1883: Rev. William Henry Hechler
- 1884: Rev. Frederic Case
- 1888: Rev. H. S. Fell
- 1889: Rev. E. B. Russell
- 1890: Rev. James Stephens
- 1891: Rev. Daniel Douglas Bennett
- 1894: Rev. Edward Woodhouse Shepherd
- 1908: Rev. Bertie Selwyn Smith
- 1912: Rev. John Howard Swinstead
- 1919: Rev. H. M. Williams
- 1929: Rev. David Colin Dunlop
- 1929: Rev. Thomas Linton
- 1936: Rev. Everard Duncan Deane
- 1939: Rev. Clement Harold Jones
- 1954: Rev. Cecil Ernest Ryecart
- 1963: Rev. Theodore Cooper Teape-Fugard
- 1970: Rev. P. S. Sprent
- 1973: Rev. David Inderwick Strangeways
- 1978: Rev. C. R. Frey
- 1985: Rev. M. Pitts
- 1989: Rev. William Gordon Reid
- 1992: Rev. Gerald Arthur Charles Brown
- 1996: Rev. B. J. Cumberland
- 1998: Rev. David William Ratcliff
- 2002: Rev. Bruce J. Evenson
- 2006–present: Rev. Nicholas Howe
