= Gray and Dacre Brewery =

Former English brewery

The Gray and Dacre Brewery was located in West Ham Lane, West Ham, Essex, in the first half of the nineteenth century.

== Founding and early history ==
The brewery was founded by John Gray (1791-1826) and the Dacre family, which resided in West Ham for several generations until the 1860s (Francis Dacre was described on the 1841 census as a "brewer"). Gray received financial help from his father, Owen Gray, a brewer in March, Cambridgeshire, in order to set up the business in West Ham.

In 1822, following successful experiments to improve fermentation, it was reported that the Gray and Dacre Brewery would be adopting a new fermentation system, using equipment provided by the copper merchants James Shears and Sons. Gray subsequently visited France to observe fermentation techniques there.

== Later history ==
Gray died in 1826 and was buried under the floor of the nave of All Saints Church, West Ham. His widow Lydia (1794-1855) continued to manage the business with the Dacre family. Lydia was the youngest daughter of the coppersmith James Shears. John and Lydia's children included Ann Thomson Gray, author of The Twin Pupils: Or, An Education at Home, and Frances Gray, who married her cousin the Rev. Frederick Spurrell. They were also related, through marriage, to the Watney family of brewers.

The Gray and Dacre Brewery was auctioned in 1846 and acquired by Charrington and Co.
