= Bessingham =

Village in Norfolk, England

Coordinates: 52.887°N 1.221°E

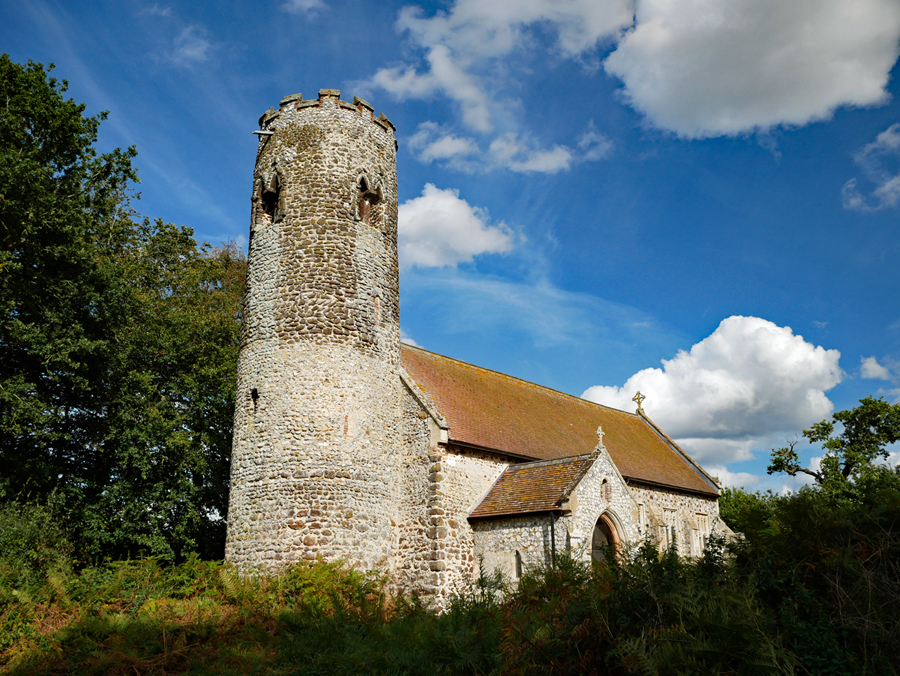
- Bessingham St Mary Round Tower Church

- Location within Norfolk
- Civil parish: Sustead
- District: North Norfolk
- Shire county: Norfolk
- Region: East
- Country: England
- Sovereign state: United Kingdom
- Post town: Norwich
- Postcode district: NR11
- UK Parliament: North Norfolk

Bessingham is a village and former civil parish, now in the parish of Sustead, in the North Norfolk district of the English county of Norfolk. It lies 8 mi (13 km) north-north-west of Aylsham and 5 mi (8.0 km) south-south-west of Cromer. In 1931 the parish had a population of 122. On 1 April 1935 the parish was abolished and merged with Sustead.

== History ==
The church, which is dedicated to St. Mary the Virgin is one of the oldest round-tower churches in England and was restored in 1869. Many of its stained glass windows were installed in the late nineteenth and early twentieth centuries and designed by C. E. Kempe and Co. and James Powell and Sons.

The manor was acquired by the Paston family, who are chiefly remembered for their 15th-century letters, and later the Anson family, and in 1766 the village's main estate was purchased by John Spurrell, a yeoman farmer from neighbouring Thurgarton. The Spurrell family expanded the estate, benefiting from the enclosure of the common land in the 1820s, and in 1870 Daniel Spurrell built a new Manor House, with lawns, a walled garden and parkland laid out around it. Daniel's daughter Katherine Anne Spurrell bred daffodils in the grounds of the Manor House, some of which received the Award of Merit from the Royal Horticultural Society, and the daffodil Narcissus 'Katherine Spurrell' was named after her by Edward Leeds. Another famous resident of the Manor House in the late nineteenth century was a bear, brought to Bessingham from India by Daniel's son Robert, a cavalry officer.

Bessingham was described as a 'ghost village' in the 1960s when most of its cottages stood empty or in ruins. The manor house became derelict after the estate was sold in 1970 and was scheduled for demolition with the land put up for sale. William Hickey bought and restored the house, winning the Graham Allen's award for "restoration and conservation" and the house is now a venue for events.
