= Thurgarton, Norfolk =

Village in Norfolk, England

Coordinates: 52.876°N 1.240°E

Thurgarton
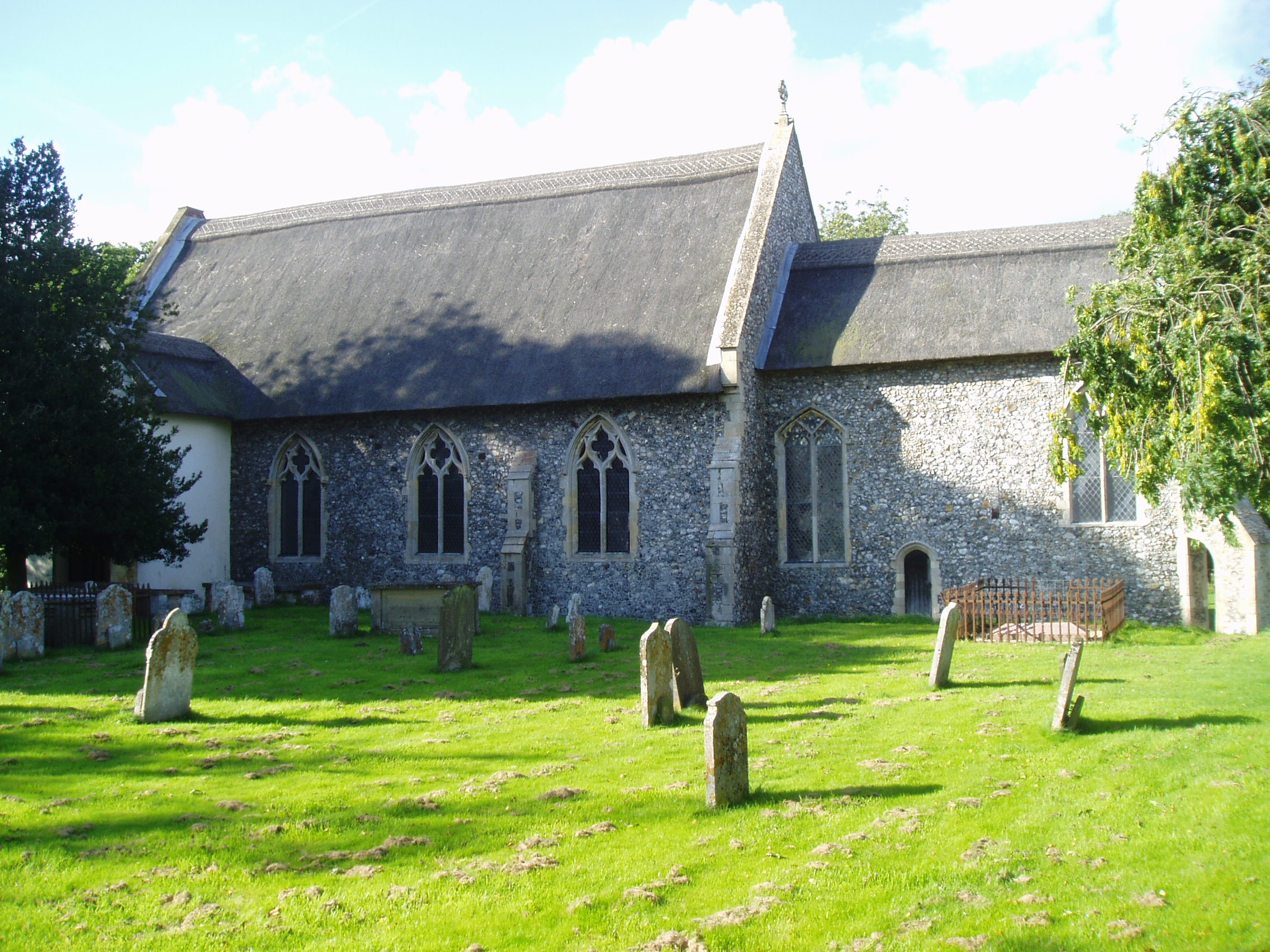
- All Saints Church

- Location within Norfolk
- Civil parish: Aldborough and Thurgarton
- District: North Norfolk
- Shire county: Norfolk
- Region: East
- Country: England
- Sovereign state: United Kingdom
- Post town: Norwich
- Postcode district: NR11
- Police: Norfolk
- Fire: Norfolk
- Ambulance: East of England

Thurgarton is a village and former civil parish, now in the parish of Aldborough and Thurgarton, in the North Norfolk district of the county of Norfolk, England. It lies 6½ miles north of Aylsham and 5½ miles south-west of Cromer, and was once part of the North Erpingham hundred. In 1931 the parish had a population of 186.

== History ==
The villages name means 'Thurgar's farm/settlement'. On 1 April 1935 the parish was abolished and merged with Aldborough.

== All Saints Church ==
All Saints Church, Thurgarton, is a redundant Anglican church situated in an isolated spot in the north of the parish. Its mediaeval round tower collapsed in 1882 and a vestry was built in its place.

The roof is thatched and the church contains a number of unusual carved bench ends. It is managed by the Churches Conservation Trust.

In 1969 the poet George Barker, who lived at nearby Itteringham, published a poem called At Thurgarton Church.

== Buildings ==
Thurgarton Hall, an eighteenth-century red-brick Georgian house, is situated next to the church and was once home to the Bacon family. It later became part of the Felbrigg Hall estate. A post mill once stood in the vicinity of the church.

Thurgarton House (also known as Thurgarton Old Hall) was built in 1733 for William Spurrell, the first of four generations of Spurrells to serve as Chief Constable of North Erpingham hundred. A Victorian wing and several brick barns were built in the nineteenth century. The house remained in the Spurrell family until 2014.
