= Gerald Brown (priest) =

Archdeacon of Scandinavia and Germany

Gerald Arthur Charles Brown (1935–2002) was an Anglican priest and Archdeacon of Scandinavia and Germany. He was educated at Corpus Christi College, Cambridge, and was ordained in 1958 after a period of study at St Stephen's House, Oxford. After a curacy in Wolverhampton, he served as vicar of parishes in Trent Vale and Wolverhampton. He later held chaplaincies at Milan, Oslo, Stockholm and Riga.

Brown also served as Archdeacon of Scandinavia and Germany from 1990 to 1995.
