= Watergate Seven =

People indicted after Watergate burglary

The Watergate Seven has come to refer to two different groups of people, both of them in the context of the Watergate scandal. Firstly, it can refer to the five men caught on June 17, 1972, burglarizing the Democratic National Committee's headquarters in the Watergate complex, along with their two handlers, E. Howard Hunt and G. Gordon Liddy, who were Nixon campaign aides. All seven were tried before Judge John Sirica in January 1973.

The second use of Watergate Seven refers to seven advisors and aides of United States President Richard M. Nixon who were indicted by a grand jury on March 1, 1974, for their roles in the Watergate scandal. The grand jury also named Nixon as an unindicted co-conspirator. The indictments marked the first time in U.S. history that a president was so named.

The period leading up to the trial of the first Watergate Seven began on January 8, 1973. The term "Watergate Seven" was coined a few months later, in April 1973, by American politician, lawyer, and political commentator Rep. Ed Koch (D-NY), who, in response to U.S. Senator Lowell P. Weicker Jr.'s indicating that one of the men in the Watergate bugging case had been ordered in the spring of 1972 to keep certain senators and representatives under surveillance, posted a sign on the door of his United States Congress office saying, "These premises were surveilled by the Watergate Seven. Watch yourself".

== Members ==
The original Watergate Seven and their legal dispositions were:

- G. Gordon Liddy – former FBI agent and general counsel for the Committee to Re-elect the President; convicted of burglary, conspiracy, and wiretapping; sentenced to 6 years and 8 months in prison; served 4 1/2 years in prison.
- E. Howard Hunt – CIA operative and leader of the White House Plumbers; convicted of burglary, conspiracy, and wiretapping; sentenced to 2 1/2 to 8 years in prison; served 33 months in prison.
- Bernard Barker – member of the Plumbers, FBI agent and alleged CIA undercover operative; pled guilty to wiretapping, planting electronic surveillance equipment, and theft of documents, and later to burglary; sentenced to 18 months to 6 years in prison for the first charge; reversed his plea and served 18 months in prison; later sentenced to 2 1/2 to 6 years in prison for the second charge; served 1 additional year in prison.
- Virgilio González – Cuban refugee and locksmith; convicted of conspiracy, burglary, and wiretapping; sentenced to 1 to 4 years in prison; served 13 months in prison.
- Eugenio Martínez – Cuban exile and CIA undercover operative; convicted of conspiracy, burglary, and wiretapping; sentenced to 1 to 4 years in prison; served 15 months in prison; pardoned by Ronald Reagan.
- James W. McCord Jr. – former CIA officer and FBI agent; convicted on eight counts of conspiracy, burglary, and wiretapping; sentenced to 25 years in prison, reduced to 1 to 5 years in prison after he implicated others in the plot; served only 4 months.
- Frank Sturgis – CIA undercover operative and guerrilla trainer, military serviceman; convicted of conspiracy, burglary, and wiretapping, and separately on a charge of transporting stolen cars to Mexico; sentenced to 1 to 4 years in prison for Watergate (the sentence for the transport charge was folded into the Watergate sentence, due to his cooperation); served 14 months in prison.

The seven advisors and aides later indicted in 1974 were:

- John N. Mitchell – former United States Attorney General and director of Nixon's 1968 and 1972 election campaigns; faced a maximum of 30 years in prison and $42,000 in fines. On February 21, 1975, Mitchell was found guilty of conspiracy, obstruction of justice, and perjury, and sentenced to 2 1/2 to 8 years in prison, which was later reduced to 1 to 4 years; he actually served 19 months.
- H. R. Haldeman – White House chief of staff, considered the second-most powerful man in the government during Nixon's first term; faced a maximum of 25 years in prison and $16,000 in fines; in 1975, he was convicted of conspiracy and obstruction of justice, and received an 18-month prison sentence.
- John Ehrlichman – former assistant to Nixon in charge of domestic affairs; faced a maximum of 25 years in prison and $40,000 in fines. Ehrlichman was convicted of conspiracy, obstruction of justice, perjury, and other charges; he served 18 months in prison.
- Charles Colson – former White House counsel specializing in political affairs; pled nolo contendere on June 3, 1974, to one charge of obstruction of justice, having persuaded the prosecution to change the charge from one of which he believed himself innocent to another of which he believed himself guilty, in order to testify freely. Colson was sentenced to 1 to 3 years of prison and fined $5,000; he served seven months.
- Gordon C. Strachan – White House aide to Haldeman; faced a maximum of 15 years in prison and $20,000 in fines. Charges against him were dropped before trial.
- Robert Mardian – aide to Mitchell and counsel to the Committee to Re-elect the President in 1972; faced 5 years in prison and $5,000 in fines. His conviction was overturned on appeal.
- Kenneth Parkinson – counsel for the Committee to Re-elect the President; faced 10 years in prison and $10,000 in fines. He was acquitted at trial. Although Parkinson was a lawyer, G. Gordon Liddy was in fact counsel for the Committee to Re-elect the President.
