= Bernard Barker =

Central Intelligence Agency officer (1917–2009)

- Barker in 1960
- Born: Bernard Leon Barker; March 17, 1917; Havana, Cuba
- Died: June 5, 2009 (aged 92); Miami, Florida, US
- Occupations: military, agent

Bernard Leon Barker (March 17, 1917 – June 5, 2009) was a Watergate burglar and undercover operative in CIA-directed plots to overthrow Cuban leader Fidel Castro.

== Early life ==
Barker was born in Havana, to a Russian American father of Jewish descent and a Cuban mother. Therefore, Barker was a dual citizen of Cuba and the United States. At the age of 16, Barker joined the ABC, a revolutionary group opposed to then president Gerardo Machado y Morales. It was during this period that he acquired the nickname "Macho". Worried by these developments, Barker's father sent him to live in the United States. In 1935 Barker became an American citizen, but he returned to Cuba in order to study at the University of Havana.

== World War II ==
After the Japanese attack on Pearl Harbor, triggering US entry into World War II, Barker joined the United States Army Air Forces, where he was commissioned as a Second lieutenant and trained as a Boeing B-17 Flying Fortress bombardier. On his thirteenth combat mission, he was shot down on a bombing raid to Braunschweig, Germany, February 10, 1944. The Germans held him as a prisoner of war at Stalag Luft I in Barth. The Red Army liberated the camp on May 2, 1945.

== Undercover agent ==
After the war, Barker returned to Cuba and joined the secret police under Fulgencio Batista. He was later recruited by the Federal Bureau of Investigation (FBI) and worked for them as an undercover agent. He also did work for the Central Intelligence Agency (CIA). He joined the 1961 Bay of Pigs invasion.

== Joins White House plumbers ==
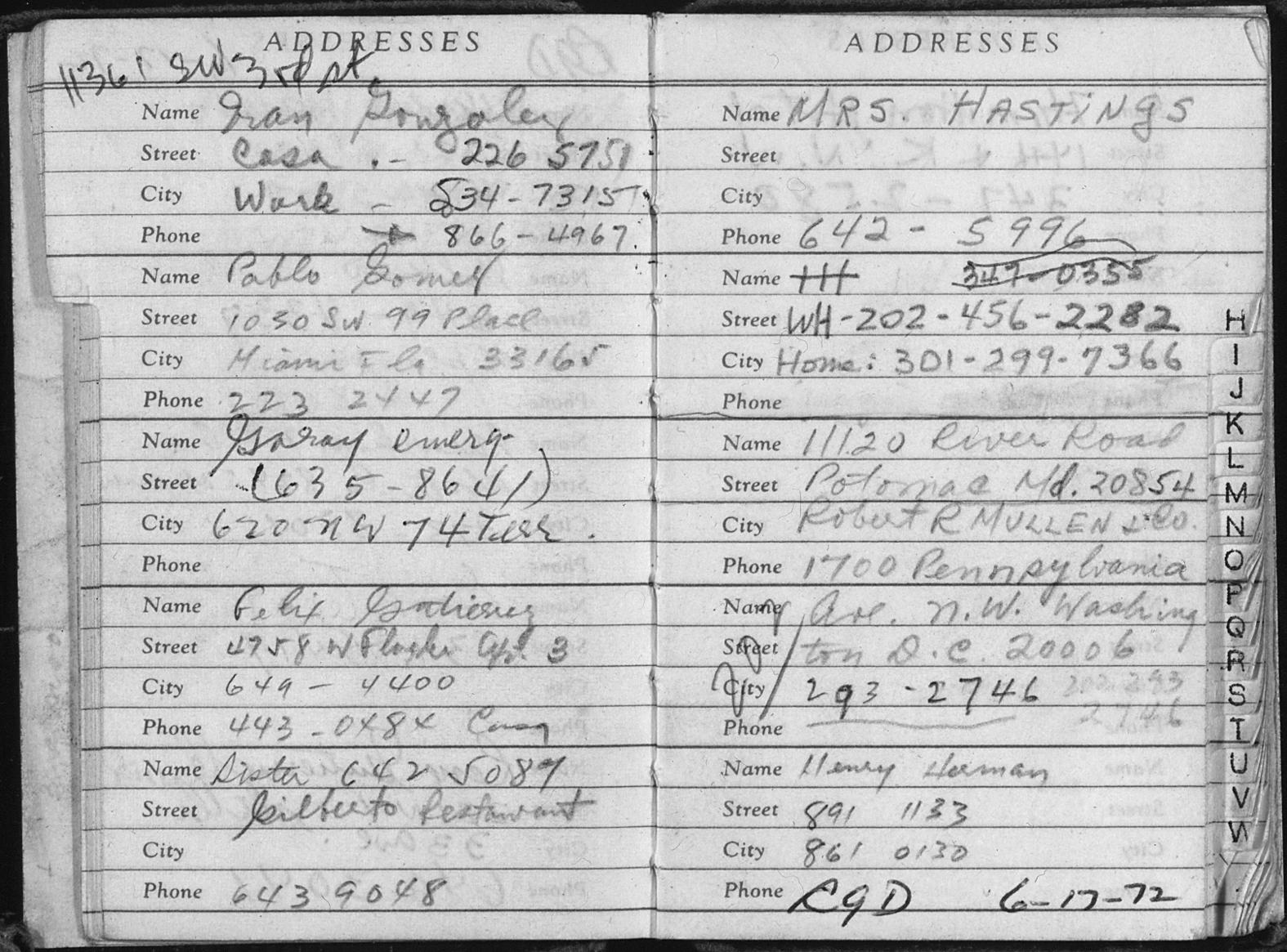
Address Book of Bernard Barker, discovered in a room at the Watergate Hotel, June 18, 1972. The HH entry on the right refers to White House counsel Howard Hunt.

In September 1971, his former CIA superior, E. Howard Hunt, recruited him for the "Plumbers", the Nixon White House's "Special Investigations Unit". He was recruited by Hunt to find background information on Daniel Ellsberg. Ellsberg was under watch for leaking the "Pentagon Papers", a series of articles featured in The New York Times in 1971 detailing U.S. government secrets concerning the Vietnam War's history. Along with Hunt and G. Gordon Liddy, Barker broke into the office of Ellsberg's psychiatrist, Dr. Lewis J. Fielding, in Los Angeles. The mission's purpose was to find discrediting information on Ellsberg. The mission was completed, but largely unsuccessful in finding any damaging information about Ellsberg.

In 1972, Barker was one of the five burglars paid by the Committee to Re-elect the President (CRP), Nixon's re-election campaign fundraising committee, for a break-in at the headquarters of the Democratic National Committee, and subsequently was convicted in the Watergate scandal. The others were Frank Sturgis, Virgilio Gonzalez, Eugenio Martinez and James McCord. Along with the other Watergate burglars, G. Gordon Liddy, and E. Howard Hunt, Barker was charged with, and pleaded guilty to, wiretapping, planting electronic surveillance equipment, and theft of documents. Hunt claimed that Barker gave testimony, corroborating his assertion to the Senate Watergate Committee, that the reason they broke in was they were told by Liddy to search for evidence of clandestine financial contributions being received from foreign powers, such as Cuba.

Barker also worked with CRP to get money which went into the Nixon campaign coffers off the books; it was via his bank account that $25,000 from Archer Daniels Midland Chief Executive Dwayne Andreas was obtained by CRP in violation of campaign finance laws.

On March 7, 1974, Barker, along with Ehrlichman, Charles Colson, Liddy, Martinez, and Felipe de Diego, was indicted for the Ellsberg burglary. Barker was released pending appeal after serving one year of a two-and-a-half to six-year sentence.

== Later life and death ==
After Barker's release from prison, he worked as a building inspector for the city of Miami, Florida, earning $18,512 per year. He chose early retirement in 1982 rather than fight proceedings seeking his dismissal for loafing on the job.

President Jimmy Carter denied him a pardon.

Barker died of lung cancer in his Miami home on June 5, 2009, aged 92. His fourth wife, Dora Maria Barker, survived him.

Barker was portrayed in All the President's Men, the 1976 film retelling the events of the Watergate scandal, by Henry Calvert. He is played by Yul Vazquez in the 2023 miniseries, White House Plumbers.
