= White House Plumbers (miniseries) =

Political comedy television miniseries

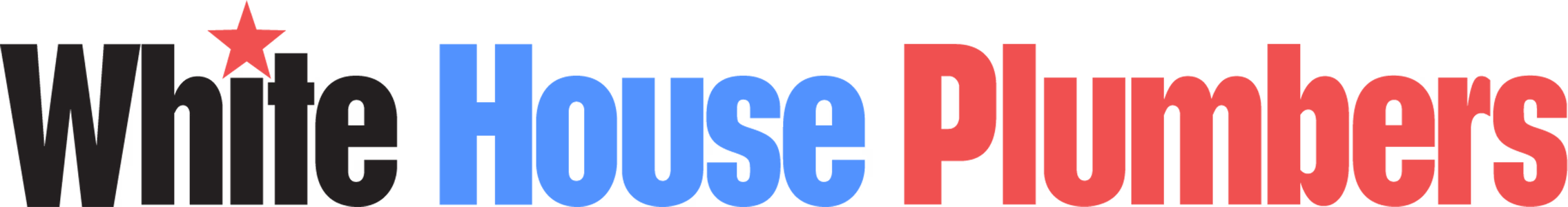
- Genre: Political drama; Satire
- Created by: Alex Gregory; Peter Huyck
- Based on: Integrity: Good People, Bad Choices, and Life Lessons from the White House by Egil Krogh and Matthew Krogh
- Written by: Alex Gregory; Peter Huyck
- Directed by: David Mandel
- Starring: Woody Harrelson; Justin Theroux; Lena Headey; Domhnall Gleeson; Judy Greer; Kim Coates; Toby Huss; Liam James; Tony Plana; Yul Vazquez; Zoe Levin; Nelson Ascencio; Tre Ryder; Alexis Valdés; Ike Barinholtz; Kiernan Shipka
- Music by: Jeff Cardoni
- Country of origin: United States
- Original language: English
- No. of episodes: 5

Production
- Executive producers: David Mandel; David Bernad; Ruben Fleischer; Alex Gregory; Peter Huyck; Gregg Fienberg; Len Amato; Frank Rich; Paul Lee; Mark Roybal; Nne Ebong; Woody Harrelson; Justin Theroux
- Producer: Jeffrey T. Bernstein
- Cinematography: Steven Meizler
- Editors: Roger Nygard; Erick Fefferman; Grady Cooper; Jon Merchen; Steven Rasch
- Running time: 45–63 minutes
- Production companies: Fearless Films; Hot Seat Productions; Perfect Pleasant Productions; Genco Pura Olive Oil Company; wiip; The District; Crash&Salvage; HBO Entertainment

Original release
- Network: HBO
- Release: May 1 – May 29, 2023

White House Plumbers is an American satirical political drama television miniseries created and written by Alex Gregory and Peter Huyck and directed by David Mandel, based on the 2007 book Integrity by Egil Krogh and Matthew Krogh. The series stars Woody Harrelson, Justin Theroux, Domhnall Gleeson, Kiernan Shipka, and Lena Headey and it premiered on HBO on May 1, 2023.

== Premise ==
Watergate masterminds and President Richard Nixon's political operatives E. Howard Hunt and G. Gordon Liddy are part of the "White House Plumbers". Charged with plugging press leaks by any means necessary, they accidentally overturned the Presidency they were trying to protect.

== Cast and characters ==
=== Main ===
- Woody Harrelson as E. Howard Hunt: A CIA officer who, as part of the White House Plumbers, was tasked with identifying the sources of national security leaks following the publication of the Pentagon Papers in 1971. Hunt was convicted of burglary, conspiracy, and wiretapping and served 33 months in prison for the charges.
- Justin Theroux as G. Gordon Liddy: A White House lawyer who worked alongside Hunt to direct the burglary of the DNC headquarters in the Watergate building. Liddy was convicted of burglary, conspiracy, and refusing to testify to the Senate committee investigating Watergate. He served nearly 52 months in federal prison for the charges.
- Lena Headey as Dorothy Hunt: wife of E. Howard Hunt.
- Domhnall Gleeson as John Dean: An attorney who served as Nixon's White House Counsel from July 1970 until April 1973. Following his role in the cover-up of the Watergate scandal, he testified to Congress as a witness and pled guilty to a single felony in exchange for a reduced sentence if he would serve as a key witness for the Watergate prosecution. Dean was disbarred as a lawyer following his guilty plea.
- Judy Greer as Fran Liddy: wife of G. Gordon Liddy
- Kim Coates as Frank Sturgis
- Gary Cole as Mark Felt
- Toby Huss as James W. McCord Jr.
- Liam James as Saint John Hunt
- Tony Plana as Eugenio "Musculito" Martínez
- Yul Vazquez as Bernard "Macho" Barker
- Zoe Levin as Lisa Hunt
- Nelson Ascencio as Virgilio "Villo" Gonzalez
- Rich Sommer as Egil "Bud" Krogh
- Tre Ryder as David Hunt
- Alexis Valdés as Felipe De Diego
- Ike Barinholtz as Jeb Stuart Magruder
- John Carroll Lynch as John N. Mitchell
- Joel Murray as Don
- Emily Pendergast as Edwina
- Kathleen Turner as Dita Beard
- Zak Orth as Alfred C. Baldwin III
- Kiernan Shipka as Kevan Hunt
- Marc Menchaca as Carl Shoffler
- David Pasquesi as James Jesus Angleton
- Eddie K. Robinson as Frank Wills
- F. Murray Abraham as Judge John Sirica
- Corbin Bernsen as Richard Kleindienst
- David Krumholtz as William Bittman
- Neil Casey as Douglas Caddy
- Prema Cruz as Michele Clark
- Peter Serafinowicz as William F. Buckley Jr.
- Steven Bauer as Dr. Manuel Artime
- Annie Fitzgerald
- Peter Grosz as Earl Silbert
- Robert Smigel as Inmate Friedman

=== Guest ===
- Jim Downey as Spencer Oliver
- Joel Van Liew as David Young
- J. P. Manoux as Robert Mardian

Additionally, Robert Redford made an uncredited voice-only cameo as Bob Woodward, reprising his role from All the President's Men.

== Episodes ==
No.	Title	Directed by	Written by	Original release date	U.S. viewers (millions)
1	"The Beverly Hills Burglary"	David Mandel	Alex Gregory & Peter Huyck	May 1, 2023	0.216
In June of 1971, Nixon aide Bud Krogh hires two right-wing zealots: former CIA agent Howard Hunt and former FBI agent G. Gordon Liddy, to form the new Special Investigations Unit in the White House, later called the Plumbers, to discredit Pentagon Papers leaker Daniel Ellsberg and others. FBI official Mark Felt legally taps Ellsberg and his psychiatrist Fielding’s phones but refuses SIU requests for illegal file acquisition and polygraph tests of government officials. Hunt and Liddy fly to Beverly Hills with CIA disguises and cameras and legally photograph Fielding’s office. Hunt’s CIA wife Dorothy immediately hates Liddy for his fondness of Hitler speeches and guns. Krogh and Ehrlichman are impressed enough to approve a break-in using Hunt’s ex-CIA Bay of Pigs guys Bernard "Macho" Barker, Felipe de Diego, and Eugenio "Musculito" Martinez to photograph Ellsberg’s psychiatric files and leave no trace of a break-in, hoping to find Ellsberg’s commie links. The Cubans make a mess breaking in, making it look like junkies doing a burglary, and they find no Ellsberg files. Hunt and Liddy believe they failed, but Nixon is impressed with the Plumbers as men of action, hiring them to sabotage the Democrats, working across the street at CRP, with Liddy as CRP counsel under Jeb Magruder and John Dean replacing Krogh as White House contact. CIA photo-lab guys develop film from returned cameras of Liddy and Hunt in disguise at Dr. Fielding’s office in California.
2	"Please Destroy This, Huh?"	David Mandel	Alex Gregory & Peter Huyck	May 8, 2023	0.163
Liddy and Hunt make a pitch, with fancy posters made by CIA artists, to Attorney General John Mitchell at his CRP office, to get one million dollars for their twelve Operation Gemstone dirty tricks operations. Operations included suppressing the black vote, blackmailing Democrats at the Democratic National Convention with hookers and drugs, dressing up bums as Democrats at their convention to embarrass them, kidnapping or killing radical-left hippie activists so they can’t disrupt the Republican National Convention, planting operatives at the DNC and leading Democratic campaigns, and bugging leading Democratic candidates. Mitchell wants better ideas for a lower price. When Attorney General Mitchell is publicly accused by columnist Jack Anderson of accepting a $400k bribe from ITT to fund CRP, in exchange for a favorable anti-trust judgment, Hunt and Liddy are called to make the ITT story go away. Hunt bribes and convinces the key ITT lobbyist to disavow a memo that she wrote detailing the corrupt scheme, which was leaked to Anderson. The Senate investigation of the scheme falls apart, which pleases Mitchell enough to approve one of the Gemstone operations for $250,000 to plant bugs at DNC Headquarters. Magruder foists CRP security chief James McCord on the Plumbers, because he has bugging skills from his work at CIA and FBI, despite him being on the official CRP payroll and Liddy hating him. A team of eight Plumbers: Liddy, Hunt, McCord, and five ex-CIA assets in Cuba: Frank Sturgis, "Macho" Barker, "Musculito" Martinez, Virgilio "Villo" Gonzalez, and Felipe de Diego, meet across the street from the Watergate complex to discuss the operation.
3	"Don't Drink the Whiskey at the Watergate"	David Mandel	Alex Gregory & Peter Huyck	May 15, 2023	0.195
On their first DC break-in attempts, Hunt fails to enter the Watergate DNC office and Liddy can’t enter McGovern HQ. All eight Plumbers enter Watergate the next night for a phony Federal Reserve meeting, but Villo can’t pick the DNC lock. Hunt wants to quit, and Dorothy Hunt thinks the operations are crazy, but Liddy convinces Hunt that Nixon needs him. On their third attempt, they have more tools and enter the Watergate garage that McCord, disguised as a delivery man, had taped open earlier. Villo picks the DNC door and they install three bugs and photograph lots of files, and their lookout guy Alfred Baldwin in the Howard Johnson's sets up a radio bug-receiver and recorder. Liddy and Hunt think they’re heroes, but Dean and Magruder report that only one bug works, and all stolen data is useless. Mitchell rejects Liddy’s proposal to pay hippies to piss on McGovern’s hotel carpet. Nixon wants another operation to fix the DNC bugs and photograph Larry O'Brien's files, and Liddy convinces a skeptical Hunt for one last operation, which infuriates Dorothy Hunt. On June 16, McCord’s door tape is removed by the Watergate security guard, so McCord sneaks in again to tape the garage door, and he and the four Cubans enter after hours, with Hunt and Liddy on the lookout across the street. McCord didn’t think to remove the door tape upon entry, so the suspicious guard again finds the garage door taped open, this time calling DC Police, who arrest five "burglars" in the DNC office. Bernard Barker has a letter with Howard Hunt’s name and address.
4	"The Writer's Wife"	David Mandel	Alex Gregory & Peter Huyck	May 22, 2023	0.172
Hunt and his teen son Saint John throw his Plumber equipment into the river. Liddy tells Nixon’s new AG Kleindienst that Watergate was a CRP job under Mitchell. McCord is identified by a cop despite his fake ID, while the Cubans stay silent. Bob Woodward calls Hunt about why his name is on Barker’s envelope, and the press report that Hunt and Liddy are CRP staffers who led the burglary. Dean tells Liddy and Hunt to say nothing to the FBI while he and Nixon's new FBI chief Gray stop Mark Felt from investigating White House connections to Watergate and the Ellsberg break-in by calling them national security CIA operations. Howard fantasizes about slipping away to Nicaragua to work for his dictator friend Somoza, but Dorothy forces him to embrace reality and get a lawyer. Howard and Liddy stay silent, hoping for a Nixon pardon, but Dorothy tells Nixon’s lawyer LaRue that either they pay up or Howard will talk. Dorothy picks up regular hush money cash and distributes some to McCord and Liddy, but the payments stop by his federal arraignment on six charges in September 1972 as Howard loses his public relations job and is broke. Howard wants to write a lucrative Watergate book with Liddy, without implicating Nixon, but Liddy refuses, so Howard restarts the cash flow by threatening to reveal Nixon's role in the Ellsberg burglary and who really killed John F. Kennedy. Dorothy tells Howard she’s divorcing him before getting on a plane that crashes on December 8, 1972.
5	"True Believers"	David Mandel	Alex Gregory & Peter Huyck	May 29, 2023	N/A
Hunt suspects his wife’s crash was intentional to keep him silent, so he still doesn't cooperate. Liddy sees Hunt is close to cracking so he offers to kill Hunt for Dean to keep him silent, but Dean declines, saying prison will be easy, they’ll get $30k per year and pardons. Liddy warns Dean he’ll be the new fall guy because of his obstruction of justice. Nixon publicly lies that Dean found no White House involvement. Frank Sturgis warns Hunt to not mention their trip to Dallas in 1963. The seven are charged with six federal counts of conspiracy, burglary, and wiretapping. Prosecutors have no evidence of White House involvement because Dean tampered with evidence to only implicate Hunt and Liddy. Judge Sirica and the prosecutor offer cooperation deals, but only McCord accepts, saying it wasn’t a CIA job and they all know more and were pressured to stay silent. McCord goes free, and the others to jail on provisional long sentences with time to cooperate before final sentencing. Sirica inspires Senate Watergate hearings. Hunt sells his home, sending his young son to his godfather. When Dean cooperates with the Senate, Hunt has a stroke, then his daughter convinces him to testify. Hunt and Liddy blame each other for the mess, with Liddy threatening to kill Hunt. Hunt finally testifies to the Senate that White House officials were involved, but he still gets 2.5 years in prison, with Liddy serving 4.5 years.

== Production ==
=== Development ===
On December 4, 2019, it was announced that HBO had ordered the five-episode limited series created and executive produced by Alex Gregory, Peter Huyck, David Mandel, Frank Rich, Ruben Fleischer, and David Bernad. Gregory and Huyck were attached to write the miniseries with Mandel directing all episodes. The series premiered on May 1, 2023.

=== Casting ===
Alongside the series order announcement, Woody Harrelson and Justin Theroux were set to star in lead roles as well as executive produce. In April 2021, Domhnall Gleeson and Lena Headey were cast in main roles. In May 2021, Kiernan Shipka, Ike Barinholtz, Yul Vazquez, David Krumholtz, Rich Sommer, Kim Coates, and Liam James joined the cast in starring roles while Nelson Ascencio, Gary Cole, Toby Huss, Zoe Levin, John Carroll Lynch, Zak Orth, and Tony Plana were cast in undisclosed capacities. In the same month, the following week, Kathleen Turner joined the main cast. In June 2021, Judy Greer was cast in a main role. In July 2021, Corbin Bernsen and Alexis Valdés were cast in undisclosed capacities.

=== Filming ===
The series began principal photography on May 3, 2021, and ended on October 21, 2021. Filming took place in Poughkeepsie, New York on Zack's Way, New York City, Albany, New York, Washington, D.C., Charlotte Amalie, U.S. Virgin Islands, Beverly Hills, California, and Redondo Beach, California. On August 5, 2021, production was suspended after an audio recording reportedly captured Mandel berating and threatening the head of props, and the props department walked off the set. Filming resumed on August 12 with additional protocols following the incident.

== Reception ==
On the review aggregator website Rotten Tomatoes, the series holds a 70% approval rating, with an average rating of 6.1/10, based on 47 critic reviews. The website's critics consensus reads, "White House Plumbers gets clogged up by its overstuffed adherence to real history, but with actors this appealing and material that truly is stranger than fiction, it flushes down easy enough." Metacritic, which uses a weighted average, has assigned a score of 62 out of 100 based on 22 critics, indicating "generally favorable reviews".
