= Thomas Karamessines =

CIA deputy director (1917–1978)

Thomas Hercules Karamessines (July 25, 1917 – September 4, 1978) was the Deputy Director for Plans of the United States Central Intelligence Agency from July 31, 1967 until February 27, 1973. Karamessines was actively involved in the Agency's Project FUBELT to undermine the government of Chilean president Salvador Allende.

== Early life ==
Karamessines was born in New York City to Greek parents. He graduated from Columbia University in 1938 and from Columbia Law School in 1940. From 1941 to 1942, he served as a deputy district attorney for New York County with Thomas Dewey.

== Military service ==
Karamessines served in the United States Army during the World War II, but because of his knowledge of Greek language and history was assigned to the Office of Strategic Services (OSS), an organization that eventually would transform into the Central Intelligence Agency in 1948.

== Intelligence career ==
Karamessines started out his intelligence career as analyst for the Greek Desk OSS/X2 (Counter-Intelligence) following the liberation of Greece. After the dissolution of the OSS in October 1945, Karamessines stayed on as the director of intelligence for the US Embassy, possibly at the request of Lincoln MacVeagh. He became a member of the CIA after that organization was established in September 1947 and eventually CIA Station Chief in Athens. Karamessines came to work in the Office of Policy Coordination (OPC), the covert operations wing of the CIA created in 1948, directed by Frank Wisner. The OPC concentrated on "propaganda, economic warfare; preventive direct action, including sabotage, anti-sabotage, demolition and evacuation measures; subversion against hostile states, including assistance to underground resistance groups, and support of indigenous anti-Communist elements in threatened countries of the free world." As chief American intelligence officer during the Greek Civil War, Karamessines was instrumental in organizing the Greek Central Intelligence Agency (KYP) along American lines. Karamessines worked undercover in Greece until 1953, and was Chief of Station in Rome from 1959–1963 before being appointed Assistant Deputy Director for Plans under Richard Helms, holding the same post under Desmond FitzGerald. When the latter died of a heart attack in July 1967, Karamessines succeeded him as Deputy Director for Plans (with Cord Meyer serving as the Assistant Deputy Director for Plans).

== Operations ==
=== Piano Solo in Italy ===
During his time as Chief of Station in Rome, and in the course of the ongoing anti-communist operations of the CIA in Italy, Karamessines was involved in events linked to the Piano Solo, a plan for a coup d'état in the case of a communist election victory, drawn up by General Giovanni de Lorenzo, then head of SIFAR and the Carabinieri. In this context he was involved in blackmail of political leaders from the Left, especially those linked to Aldo Moro. Under De Lorenzo's leadership of the SIFAR (1955–1962), the agency had opened dossiers on a total of 157,000 people, including mostly innocent citizens and politicians. Allegedly, de Lorenzo gave Karamessines two copies of each file, one for the CIA station in Rome, the other to be sent on to the CIA's headquarters in Langley.

=== Chilean presidential elections of 1970 ===
Karamessines was responsible for Operation MB (including a major campaign against the left-wing press called MHCHAOS or Operation Chaos, targeting some 500 newspapers, infiltrating those opposing the Vietnam War), and as chairman of the Chile Task Force he played a major role in FUBELT, the covert operation aimed at preventing Salvador Allende being inaugurated as President of Chile. In a secret cable to Henry Hecksher, CIA station head in Santiago, dated October 16, 1970, Karamessines pointed out: "It is firm and continuing policy that Allende be overthrown by a coup ... it is imperative that these actions be implemented clandestinely and securely so that the USG (United States Government) and American hand be well hidden."

Karamessines has also been implicated in the plot against General Rene Schneider, the commander-in-chief of the Chilean Army who refused to support a coup against Allende. The CIA, purportedly intending only a kidnapping and not a murder, provided weapons and money to the group that carried out the operation, but General Schneider was shot during the attempt and died in a hospital three days later. The operation's failure backfired badly, rallying both the people of Chile and its military in support of Allende. The latter was confirmed as the President-elect of Chile by the National Congress of Chile on October 24, 1970.

=== Watergate scandal ===
Three of the central figures in the Watergate scandal (E. Howard Hunt, Eugenio Martinez, and James W. McCord) were former employees of the CIA, creating political problems for Helms and Karamessines. Although then-President Richard Nixon and several of his staff (including senior aides such as White House Counsel John Dean and Chief of Staff H. R. Haldeman) tried to cover up the scandal (or at least mitigate the damage) by instructing the CIA to block further investigation by the FBI, something which Helms forcefully resisted, it spiraled out of the White House's control and ultimately forced Nixon to resign his office on August 9, 1974. On February 2, 1973, however, his feelings towards his Director of Central Intelligence soured beyond repair, Nixon had already fired Richard Helms, and Karamessines subsequently resigned in solidarity.

== Death ==
Karamessines died of a heart attack at his vacation home in Lac Grand, Quebec.
