= Eugenio Martínez =

American activist (1922–2021)

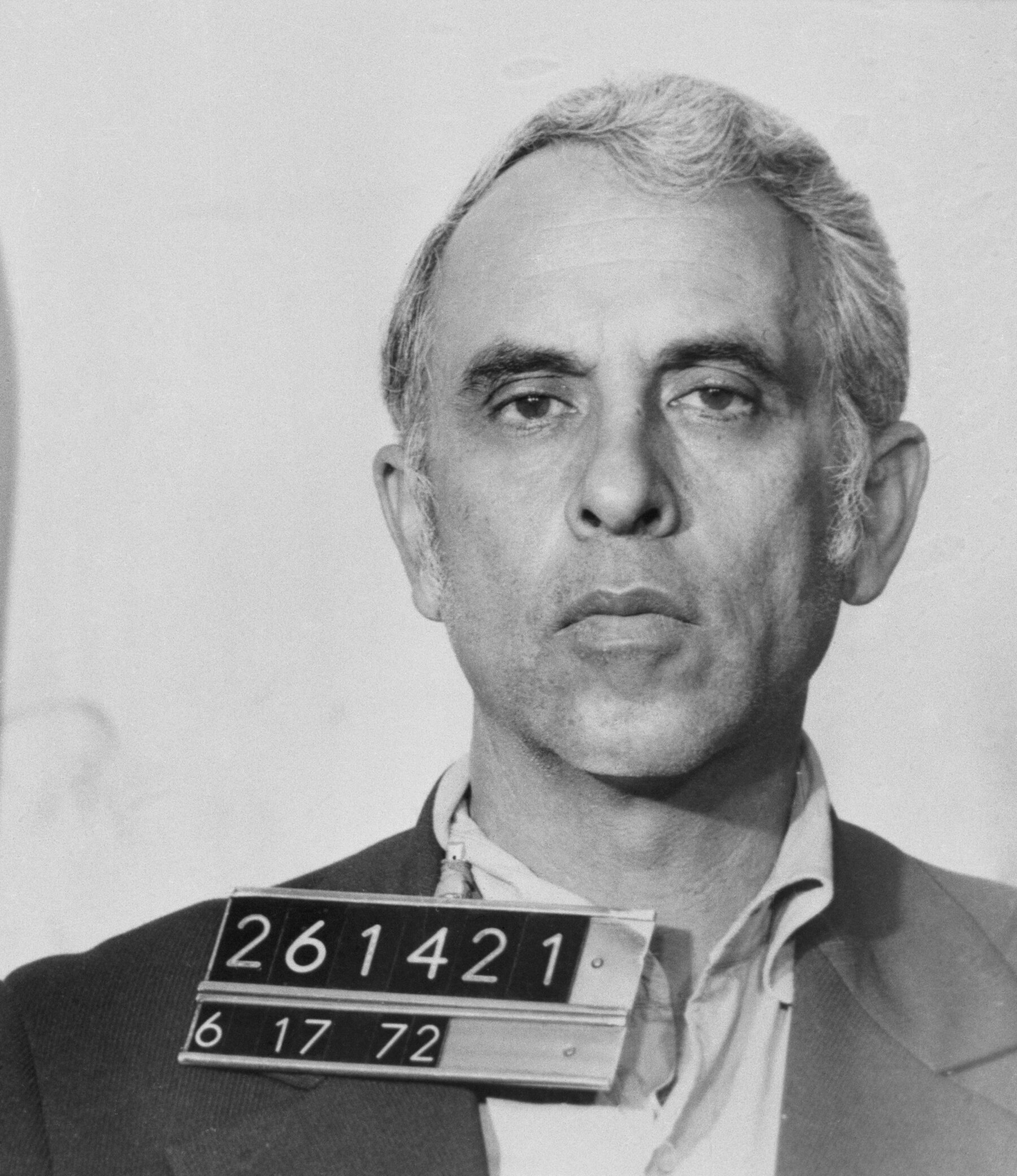
- Martínez's mugshot after his arrest, 1972
- Born: Eugenio Rolando Martínez Careaga; July 8, 1922; Pinar del Río, Republic of Cuba
- Died: January 30, 2021 (aged 98); Minneola, Florida, US
- Other name: Eugenio Musculito
- Occupation: Real estate agent
- Known for: Participation in the Watergate Scandal
- Children: 1

Eugenio Rolando Martínez Careaga (alias Musculito, July 8, 1922 – January 30, 2021) was a member of the anti-Castro movement in the early 1960s, and later was one of the five men recruited by G. Gordon Liddy and E. Howard Hunt in 1972 for the Memorial Day weekend Watergate burglary at the Democratic National Committee (DNC) headquarters in Washington, D.C. He later worked as a real estate agent.

Weeks after the initial break-in, on June 17, 1972, the men were arrested by District of Columbia Police inside DNC headquarters during what they said was a second entry into the building to correct problems with the first break-in. Martinez and the others were convicted in the ensuing Watergate scandal. The others were Frank Sturgis, Virgilio Gonzalez, Bernard Barker and James McCord. After completing his 15 month prison term, Martinez was pardoned by President Ronald Reagan in 1983. Martínez was the only person aside from Nixon to receive a pardon for his role in the scandal.

On August 31, 2016, the conservative watchdog group Judicial Watch obtained CIA internal documents, through a FOIA request, that stated Martinez was a paid asset of the Agency at the time of the break-in. Although his connection to the Agency was acknowledged, until this release the CIA had maintained that his service had ended and he no longer had an association with the Agency for at least two years prior to the incident at the Watergate Hotel. He died on January 30, 2021, at his daughter's home in Minneola, Florida at the age of 98. He was the last living person of the original Watergate Seven that burglarized the Democratic National Committee.

== In popular culture ==
Martinez was portrayed in All the President's Men, the 1976 film retelling the events of the Watergate scandal, by Dominic Chianese. Additionally, he has been portrayed by Puerto Rican actor Kamar de los Reyes in Oliver Stone's 1995 biographical film Nixon, and in the 2023 TV mini-series White House Plumbers, he was played by Tony Plana.

The 2012 novel The Cassandra Project (ISBN 978-1-937008-71-0) by Jack McDevitt and Mike Resnick, set in 2019 and correctly predicting that Martinez would be the last surviving Watergate burglar at that time, has him divulge to a character that the true purpose of the Watergate burglary was to obtain the notebook of another character (supposedly a close friend of both John Ehrlichman and Larry O'Brien) relating to discoveries made by a secret moon landing, and the DNC wiretaps were a diversion.

Martinez is a minor character in Harlot's Ghost, a novel by Norman Mailer.
