= Robert Mardian =

American politician (1923–2006)

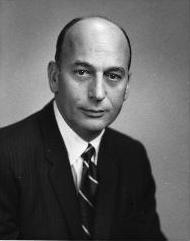

Personal details
- Born: Robert Charles Mardian; October 23, 1923 Pasadena, California, U.S.
- Died: July 17, 2006 (aged 82) San Clemente, California, U.S.
- Party: Republican
- Spouse: Dorothy Denniss
- Education: Minot State University; University of California, Santa Barbara (BA); Columbia University (MA); University of Southern California (JD)

Robert Charles Mardian (October 23, 1923 – July 17, 2006) was a United States Republican party official who served in the administration of Richard Nixon, and was embroiled in the Watergate scandal as one of the Watergate Seven who were indicted by a grand jury for campaign violations. His conviction for conspiracy was overturned because of procedural unfairness and he was not subsequently retried.

== Family and early life ==
Mardian's father, Samuel, was from the Armenian town of Hadjin in the Vilayet of Adana in the Ottoman Empire (present day Saimbeyli in Mediterranean Turkey). He was born Samuel Zeligian into a Christian family and was a member of Second Congregational Church in Hadjin. Following the massacre of 35,000 Armenians in Adana in 1909 and the siege of Christian Hadjin Samuel escaped with his family and was in the United States by 1912. Samuel settled in California and supported progressive politicians such as Hiram Johnson and Franklin D. Roosevelt.

Samuel Mardian's four sons, however, adopted free-market politics. Robert Mardian's brother, Daniel Mardian Sr. founded Mardian Construction Company, a multi-million dollar concern, which contributed to Arizona's prominence and Samuel Mardian Jr. joined him as the vice president. Samuel Mardian also served as mayor of Phoenix, Arizona from 1960 to 1964, and was a leading supporter of Barry Goldwater.

Robert Mardian went to public school in Pasadena, California followed by Columbia University, North Dakota State Teachers College, and the University of California, Santa Barbara. While serving in the United States Navy he met and married Dorothy Denniss in 1946. They had three sons. Mardian was awarded a law degree from the University of Southern California in 1949. After leaving law school he went into private practice as a corporate lawyer.

== Politics ==
In 1956, Mardian, already active in the Republican Party, was appointed to a vacant seat on the Pasadena School Board. He was elected in 1957 but resigned shortly afterwards through pressure of work. From 1962, Mardian left his law practice to become vice president and chief legal officer of a savings and loan association. In the 1964 presidential election he managed the Goldwater campaign in four western states; although Goldwater was unsuccessful, his campaigning ability impressed Richard Nixon and he was appointed to the same position in Nixon's 1968 campaign. This time, of the four western states, the Republicans carried all but Washington. In the intervening years, he served as chairman of Ronald Reagan's state advisory committee during his 1966 gubernatorial campaign in California.

== Nixon official ==
His work on the 1968 campaign led to Mardian becoming close to campaign managerJohn N. Mitchell. Mardian was appointed general counsel to the Department of Health, Education and Welfare in the Nixon administration. He supported Mitchell's 'Southern strategy' and advised the Department on ways of slowing the pace of school integration. His success in this post led to a promotion to Assistant Attorney General under Mitchell.

Mardian was in charge of the Internal Security Division, which headed up the fight against the radical left, prosecuting draft dodgers. He was entrusted to transfer to the White House the wiretap logs which had been discovered among J. Edgar Hoover's possessions in the Federal Bureau of Investigation after his death.

== Watergate ==
Mardian became involved in the Nixon administration's unorthodox campaigns early when he headed the federal prosecution of Pentagon Papers leaker Daniel Ellsberg in 1971. Although passed over for the appointment as deputy manager of CRP, Mardian was appointed as a 'political coordinator' with an uncertain role, as well as counsel for the committee.

The offense for which Mardian was convicted, but later cleared, occurred on June 17, 1972. Mardian was with other campaign officials in California preparing for a fundraising dinner. Having learned of the arrest of the five men in the Watergate complex, Jeb Stuart Magruder testified that at John N. Mitchell's suggestion Mardian telephoned G. Gordon Liddy and told Liddy to contact Attorney General Kleindienst, with an order that James W. McCord, Jr. should be released before his identity was discovered. Liddy insisted that the call had come from Magruder. Mardian always insisted on his innocence and since the trial has said that John Dean had the idea of calling Kleindienst. Mardian stated that he could have played no role in getting the burglars released, given his location and the difference in time zones.

On June 20, Mardian and Fred LaRue met with Liddy in LaRue's apartment in the Watergate complex, where Liddy told him the full story of 'the plumbers' activities. Mardian suggested to Liddy that he was likely to be traced and ought to give himself up; he also said that Mitchell was unlikely to let CRP funds be used to bail the Cuban burglars, but the Cuban community in Florida might help.

== Indictment and trial ==
When Jeb Stuart Magruder decided to cooperate with the prosecution on April 10, 1973, it became certain that Mardian would be indicted, although he had first to go before the Ervin Senate committee (July 19–20, 1973). Before the Senators, Mardian was an effective witness in defense of his actions. The grand jury nonetheless indicted him on March 1, 1974.

In January 1975, Mardian was convicted on one count of conspiracy to hinder the investigation. He was sentenced to 10 months to 3 years on February 21, 1975, but on appeal in 1976 the conviction was quashed. The United States Court of Appeals for the District of Columbia Circuit held that Mardian ought to have been tried separately because his lawyer, David Bress, fell ill two weeks into the trial, and because of Mardian's limited alleged role. The special prosecutor declined to retry him; in 1997 his appeal lawyer Arnold Rochvarg wrote a book outlining the legal history of the case and arguing that Mardian was innocent.

== Later years ==
After leaving his campaign position, Mardian moved to Phoenix, Arizona to join the family construction business. He retired in 2002 and remained in Phoenix, with a summer home in California.

Before the May 2005 revelation that W. Mark Felt was the mysterious Watergate source known as "Deep Throat," some believed that Mardian had been the informant. When Felt was revealed to have been the source, Mardian told the Arizona Republic that Felt "betrayed his position" by leaking to The Washington Post.

Mardian died of complications from lung cancer on July 17, 2006, at his vacation home in San Clemente, California.
