= Alfred C. Baldwin III =

American FBI agent (1936–2020)

- Born: Alfred Carleton Baldwin III; June 23, 1936; New Haven, Connecticut, U.S.
- Died: January 15, 2020 (aged 83); New Paltz, New York, U.S.
- Education: Fairfield University (BBA); University of Connecticut (LLB)
- Known for: Role in the Watergate scandal
- Relatives: Raymond E. Baldwin (great-uncle)
- Military career
- Branch: United States Marine Corps
- Service years: 1957–1960
- Conflicts: Vietnam War

Alfred Carleton Baldwin (June 23, 1936 – January 15, 2020) was an American FBI agent known as the so-called "shadow man" in the Watergate break-in and the ensuing Watergate scandal. Baldwin had been hired by James McCord for a variety of purposes, one of which became to monitor electronic bugs purportedly planted by McCord in the headquarters of the Democratic National Committee (DNC) at the Watergate.

== Early life and education ==
Alfred Baldwin was born in New Haven, Connecticut. His great-uncle, Raymond E. Baldwin, served twice as governor of Connecticut and later as a member of the United States Senate. He earned a Bachelor of Business Administration from Fairfield University and a Bachelor of Laws from the University of Connecticut School of Law. He served in the United States Marine Corps.

== Career ==
Baldwin joined the Federal Bureau of Investigation in 1963 and was assigned to offices in Tampa, Memphis, and Sarasota. He resigned from the FBI in 1966 and joined a trucking company as director of security. He later worked to establish a program for law enforcement personnel at the University of New Haven. Baldwin was recruited to work for the Committee for the Re-Election of the President in 1972 and was first assigned as a bodyguard for Martha Mitchell.

=== Watergate scandal and investigation ===
Baldwin testified during congressional investigations that he had typed "almost verbatim" transcripts of phone conversations coming from the DNC headquarters, but G. Gordon Liddy testified in deposition that what he had been getting from Baldwin had only been logs that were "useless." Liddy says that he then dictated logs, "editing" as he went, and that he had his secretary, Sally Harmony, type up his dictations on stationery with "GEMSTONE" printed across the top.

Liddy said in his autobiography and in sworn deposition that he only met Baldwin once, and then only briefly, on May 31, 1972, in the dark "listening post" that had been set up by James McCord in room 723 of the Howard Johnson's motel across the street from the Watergate.

Alfred Baldwin said under oath in his congressional testimony that five days earlier than that, on the afternoon of May 26, 1972, he had been introduced by McCord to both Liddy and E. Howard Hunt in the first room McCord had rented, Room 419 of the Howard Johnson's. Baldwin also testified that later on that same night of May 26, about 1:00 or 2:00 a.m., he rode around in a car with McCord and Liddy for "over half an hour" near George McGovern's headquarters, discussing prospects for breaking in there, but that Liddy had finally said: "We'll abort the mission."

According to a 2012 article, Baldwin was distracted watching the film Attack of the Puppet People on TV and did not observe the arrival of a police car in front of the Watergate building, nor did he see the plainclothes officers investigating the DNC's sixth floor suite of 29 offices. By the time Baldwin finally noticed unusual activity on the sixth floor and radioed the burglars, it was already too late.

Liddy's co-commander of the Watergate ops, retired CIA agent E. Howard Hunt, only refers in his autobiography to Alfred Baldwin as an anonymous "monitor" hired by McCord who Hunt purportedly never was introduced to. Yet Hunt relied heavily on the unknown "monitor" for walkie-talkie reports during the Watergate activities. On the morning of June 17, 1972, several hours after McCord and the other burglars had been apprehended in the Watergate building, Hunt said he went up to Room 723 in the Howard Johnson's Hotel and knocked on the door, which was "opened a crack" where he saw an unknown "man with a crew cut indistinctly against the dark background." According to Hunt, he had a brief, terse exchange with this unknown man — Baldwin — and entrusted him with the crucial task of disposing of all the electronic receiving equipment McCord and Baldwin purportedly had installed in Room 723, telling Baldwin, "I don't care if you drive the van into the river; just get the stuff out of here." Baldwin did remove the vehicle with all its gear from the crime scene.

Hunt testified before the United States Senate Watergate Committee on September 25, 1973, that he suspected Baldwin of being a double agent with Democratic ties who betrayed the Watergate operation.

Baldwin was given immunity from prosecution by the government as the star witness and never charged or convicted in relation to the Watergate scandal. He gave a long exclusive interview to Jack Nelson of the Los Angeles Times, which was published in October, 1972. This material set off a string of other investigative articles which, combined with Congressional hearings and law enforcement investigations, eventually broke open the scandal, over the next two years.

=== Later career and death ===
In September 1974, Baldwin became a science teacher at Sheridan Middle School in New Haven, Connecticut. He later served as a prosecutor for the Connecticut Superior Court from 1986 until his retirement in 1996. Baldwin died of cancer on January 15, 2020, at the age of 83, though his death was not widely reported until May 2022.

In the 2023 TV mini-series White House Plumbers, he was played by Zak Orth.
