= Robert Mullen Company =

Former public relations company

- Founded: 1952
- Founder: Robert R. Mullen
- Defunct: 1974
- Headquarters: Washington D.C.
- Key people: Robert Foster Bennett

Robert Mullen Company was a public relations company in Washington, D.C. The firm was founded in 1952 by Robert R. Mullen, who was a campaign press secretary for Dwight D. Eisenhower and information director for the Marshall Plan. The Watergate committee report revealed that the company had in at least two instances been a front for CIA operations abroad, in addition for former CIA intelligence case officer and head of the White House plumbers E. Howard Hunt.

In 1971 the Robert Mullen Company was purchased by future U.S. Senator Robert Foster Bennett, son of U.S. Senator Wallace Foster Bennett. He closed it down in 1974.

== History ==
=== Watergate ===
In 1972 the company received public attention in relation to the Watergate scandal when staff writer E. Howard Hunt, a former CIA intelligence case officer and Mullen employee, was revealed to have been running a group of Nixon Administration "plumbers" responsible for the break-in. He was subsequently convicted of conspiracy and served time in prison.

=== CIA relationship ===
Howard Baker, the Republican vice-chairman for the Watergate committee wrote in a report:

The Mullen Company has maintained a relationship with the Central Intelligence Agency since its incorporation in 1959. It provided cover for an agent in Europe and an agent in the Far East at the time of the Watergate break-in.

=== Demise ===
Bennett's principal client at the time of the Watergate was the CIA-aligned Summa Corporation, the holding company of billionaire Howard Hughes. In 1974, after his CIA ties and those of the Mullen Company had been revealed by the Watergate investigation, (Note: Cited as appearing in "Strange Bedfellows", Howard Kohn, Rolling Stone, May 6, 1976) he closed the Company and joined Summa full-time as the public relations director for the parent firm and Vice President for Public Affairs for Hughes Airwest.

== Notable clients ==
- American Bar Association
- The Church of Jesus Christ of Latter-day Saints
- American Automobile Association
- General Foods
- United States Department of Health, Education, and Welfare
- Central Intelligence Agency
