= QKENCHANT =

CIA project to provide clearances

QKENCHANT was a Central Intelligence Agency project used to provide security approvals on non-Agency personnel and facilities.

== The project ==
In a memorandum to Assassination Records Review Board, dated 18 September 1998, Central Intelligence Agency states the following:

QKENCHANT was the name of a [Central Intelligence] Agency project used to provide security approvals on non-Agency personnel and facilities.

In a memorandum for "JFK Declassification Project of CIA, dated 27 February 1998, the [redacted] sender entity states:

QKENCHANT was a project for obtaining clearances, that is, Provisional Covert Security Approvals (PCSA) and Covert Security Approvals (CSA), with the office of security in connection with the acquisition of Directorate of Operations guidelines require that a PCSA/CSA be obtained in most instances before a <redacted> entity can be used as a <redacted>.

== E. Howard Hunt ==
Intelligence officer E. Howard Hunt was associated with QKENCHANT. Hunt, with G. Gordon Liddy and others, was one of the White House's "plumbers"—a secret team of operatives charged with fixing "leaks".

== See also ==
- CIA cryptonym
- Assassination of John F. Kennedy
- JFK Records Act
