= Frank Sturgis =

American Watergate burglar (1924–1993)

Frank Anthony Sturgis
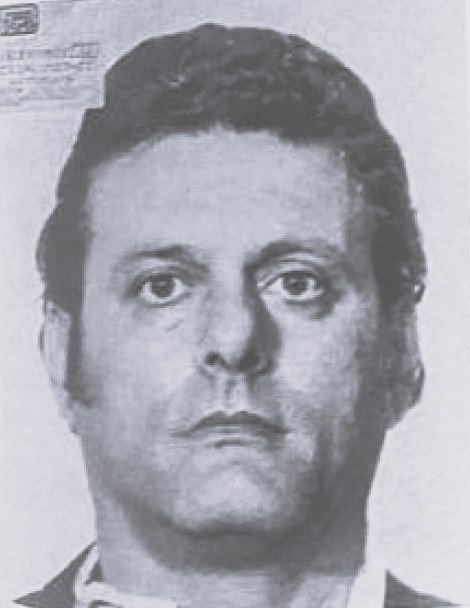
- Mug shot, 1972
- Born: Frank Angelo Fiorini; December 9, 1924; Norfolk, Virginia, U.S.
- Died: December 4, 1993 (aged 68); Miami, Florida, U.S.
- Known for: Watergate Seven

Frank Anthony Sturgis (December 9, 1924 – December 4, 1993), born Frank Angelo Fiorini, was an American CIA agent who was one of the five Watergate burglars whose capture led to the end of the presidency of Richard Nixon.

Sturgis served in several branches of the United States military and, in the Cuban Revolution of 1958, worked as an undercover operative for the Central Intelligence Agency, and is alleged by conspiracy theorists to have been involved in the assassination of John F. Kennedy.

== Early life and military service ==
When still a child, his family, which was of Italian heritage, moved to Philadelphia, Pennsylvania. On October 5, 1942, in his senior year of high school, 17-year-old Frank Angelo Fiorini joined the United States Marine Corps and served under Colonel "Red Mike" Merritt A. Edson in the First Marine Raider Battalion in the Pacific Theater during the Second World War.

"On April 14, 1942, William Donovan, as Coordinator of Information (forerunner of the Office of Strategic Services), activated units charged with gathering intelligence, harassing the Japanese through guerrilla actions, identifying targets for the Army Air Force to bomb, and rescuing downed Allied airmen." This was what led to Stilwell's Chinese forces, Wingate's Raiders, and Merrill's Marauders involvement in the war, and Frank got trained in guerrilla tactics and gathering intelligence, which became useful in his later events.

Honorably discharged as a corporal in 1945, he enrolled at Virginia Polytechnic Institute but left college after only one year and joined the Norfolk Police Department on June 5, 1946. He soon discovered a corrupt payoff system and brought it to the attention of his superiors, who told him to overlook the illegal activities. On October 5, 1946, he had a confrontation with his sergeant and resigned the same day. For the next 18 months, he managed the Havana-Madrid tavern in Norfolk, a bar that catered to sailors from the many foreign ships that visit the port to load and unload cargo.

On November 9, 1947, Fiorini joined the United States Naval Reserve at the Norfolk Naval Air Station and learned to fly while still working at the tavern. He was honorably discharged on August 30, 1948, and joined the United States Army the next day. He was sent immediately to West Berlin, where the USSR had closed the land routes during the Berlin Blockade, and he became a member of General Lucius Clay's honor guard. Two weeks after the USSR reopened the land routes on May 11, 1949, Fiorini was honorably discharged. As a Marine Raider during WWII, Fiorini had worked behind enemy lines gathering intelligence, and during his Army tenure in Berlin and Heidelberg, he had a top secret clearance and worked in an intelligence unit whose primary target was the Soviet Union. Fiorini started to believe Russia was a threat, and he became a lifelong anti-communist militant. Returning to Norfolk in 1952, he took a job managing the Cafe Society tavern, then partnered with its owner, Milton Bass, to co-purchase and manage The Top Hat Nightclub in Virginia Beach.

On September 23, 1952, Frank Fiorini filed a petition in the Circuit Court of the City of Norfolk, Virginia, to change his name to Frank Anthony Sturgis, adopting the surname of his stepfather Ralph Sturgis, whom his mother had married in 1937. His new name closely resembled that of Hank Sturgis, the fictional hero of E. Howard Hunt's 1949 novel, Bimini Run, whose life parallels Frank Sturgis's life from 1942 to 1949 in certain salient respects.

== Cuban Revolution ==
In 1956, Sturgis moved to Cuba, and went to Mexico, Venezuela, Costa Rica, Guatemala, Panama and Honduras. Sturgis moved to Miami in 1957, where the Cuban wife of his uncle Angelo Vona introduced him to former Cuban president Carlos Prío, who joined with other Cubans opposing dictator Fulgencio Batista to plot their return to power. Now Frank had gotten together with an old friend, Richard Sanderlin who was also a Norfolk, Virginia native. Once they had relocated to Miami, Florida, they began an arms and munition smuggling operation into Cuba, bound for the rebels of Fidel Castro. They were sending money to Mexico to support Fidel Castro, whose July 26 Movement had arranged a meeting between CIA Inspector General Lyman Kirkpatrick and their representatives in 1957 by Pepín Bosch, an executive of the Bacardi Corporation. Prio asked Sturgis to go to Cuba to join up with Castro and to report back to the exiled powers in Miami, so he went down and met with Castro. While Richard Sanderlin traveled to the Sierra Maestra Mountains in Oriente Province Cuba, where he began training the Castro rebels, in military strategy, tactics, weapon handling, and hand to hand fighting.

In 1958, Frank made contact with the Central Intelligence Agency (CIA) in Cuba at the US Consulate in Santiago. He worked as an informer for the agency with his control officer Sam Jenis. Sturgis also became involved running guns to Cuba, along with mobster Santo Trafficante, and not surprisingly was arrested for illegal possession of arms, but released without charge. In 1959, Sturgis had contact with casinos in Cuba and some say met Lewis McWillie, mobster Traficante's man in Cuba, and the manager of the Tropicana Casino who by his own testimony was a known acquaintance of Jack Ruby.

Sturgis met up with Castro and his 400 rebels in the Sierra Maestra mountains. Sturgis offered to train Castro's troops in guerrilla warfare. Castro accepted the offer, but he also had an immediate need for guns and ammunition, so Sturgis became a gunrunner. Using money from anti-Batista Cuban exiles in Miami and some suspect the CIA, Sturgis purchased boatloads of weapons and ammunition from CIA weapons expert Samuel Cummings' International Armament Corporation in Alexandria, Virginia. Sturgis explained later that he chose to throw in with Castro rather than Prío because Fidel was a soldier, a man of action, whereas Prío was a politician, more a man of words.

In March 1958, Sturgis opened a training camp in the Sierra Maestra mountains, where he taught Che Guevara and other 26th of July Movement rebel soldiers guerrilla warfare. When Castro seized power, a rebel firing squad on San Juan Hill executed 71 of their opponents on January 11, 1959, into an awaiting 40-foot (12.2 m) ditch that had been opened with a bulldozer. Although Sturgis did not take part in the execution, he was photographed afterwards holding a rifle on top of the covered mass grave.

Sturgis, with a July 26 Movement armband, stands on a mass grave of 71 Batista supporters at San Juan Hill on January 11, 1959.

His friend Richard Sanderlin, completed the training of Raul Castros Second Front, and led a guerrilla band into combat operations against the Cuban army of Batista.

Castro then appointed Sturgis gambling czar and director of security and intelligence for the air force, in addition to his position as a captain in July 26 Movement. Sturgis went to Miami on June 2, 1959, with Alan McDonald while "supervising the investigation of several American gamblers with criminal records that operate casinos in Havana." They requested from Metropolitan Criminal Intelligence Supervisor Frank Kappel information on "Meyer and Jake Lansky, Joe Silesi aka Joe Rivers and Santos Trafficante," that was provided to them six days later after the Cuban government sent an official written request. He was introduced to two men that were transported to Cuba from Venezuela to assist in the organization of the revolution and Frank saw they were clearly communist. He began to sound out those that he knew were anti-communist including Camilo Cienfuegos, as he knew leaders like Raúl Castro and Che Guevara were communist, but he was unsure about Fidel Castro. Sturgis defected the following month with Revolutionary Air Force chief Commandant Pedro Luis Díaz Lanz and they joined the anti-Castro exile opposition.

Sturgis participated with him a few months later in an anti-Castro leaflet-dropping raid over Cuba. Sturgis formed the Anti-Communist Brigade which Hans Tanner in his book "Counter-Revolutionary Agent", says the organization was "being financed by dispossessed hotel and gambling owners" from Cuba. The Border Patrol in Miami reported that Sturgis was involved in a CIA operation being financed by Sergio Rojas (former Cuban Ambassador to Great Britain) to overthrow Castro. It has been claimed, with little in the way of evidence, that Sturgis was involved in helping the CIA organize the Bay of Pigs Invasion, for whose ultimate failure he blamed President Kennedy. Sturgis recruited 19 year old Marita Lorenz, who was close to Fidel Castro, and she took CIA pills, which she hid in her face cream, to poison Castro, but the plot failed. According to Lorenz, she met Sturgis again before the Kennedy assassination in 1963 with others planning a big event. Lorenz stated that she joined Sturgis traveling to Dallas after the meeting. Lorenz later testified about this Kennedy assassination plot before the House Select Committee on Assassinations (HSCA).

In 1975 Sturgis testified under oath that he was approached by an associate of mobster Meyer Lansky with an offer of $1 million to assassinate Castro. Sturgis said that he was willing to accept the offer but that he did not receive "the go-ahead from his contacts in the American embassy".

Sturgis was claimed to be a member of Operation 40, a CIA-sponsored counterintelligence group composed of Cuban exiles. The group was formed to seize control of the Cuban government after the Bay of Pigs Invasion. The operation was concentrating on Cuba and were operating out of Mexico.

Despite his claimed involvement in numerous CIA sponsored operations including the Bay of Pigs invasion, the 1975 Rockefeller Commission succinctly states that "Frank Sturgis was not an employee or agent of the CIA either in 1963 or at any other time."

== International Anti-Communist Brigade ==
Shortly after abandoning the Cuban Revolution, Sturgis organized the International Anti-Communist Brigade, a mercenary group intended to operate in the Caribbean and Central America. The group was connected to a plot to assassinate Guatemalan President Kjell Eugenio Laugerud Garcia through Gerry Patrick Hemming, head of a sub-group in the Brigade known as the Intercontinental Penetration Force. Members of the Brigade, including Sturgis, Hemming, and Loran Eugene Hall have been connected to the assassination of President John F. Kennedy. The Intercontinental Penetration Force sub-group (particularly Loran Hall) was heavily connected to the assassination by Orleans Parish District Attorney Jim Garrison, but the suspicion was dropped when Hemming joined Garrison's investigation.

== Watergate burglary 1972 ==
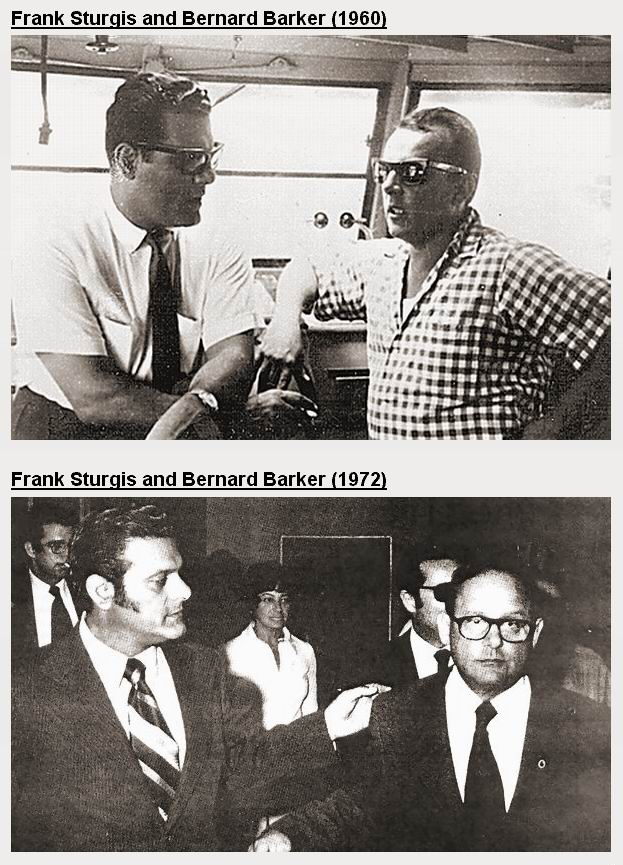
Sturgis and Bernard Barker, 1960 (top) and 1972

On June 17, 1972, Sturgis, Virgilio González, Eugenio Martínez, Bernard Barker and James W. McCord, Jr. were arrested while installing electronic listening devices in the national Democratic Party campaign offices located at the Watergate office complex in Washington. The White House office telephone number of CIA officer E. Howard Hunt was found in address books of the burglars. Reporters were able to link the break-in to the White House. The burglars had successfully entered into the same location several weeks earlier, but returned to fix a malfunctioning device and to photograph more documents. Bob Woodward, a reporter working for The Washington Post was told by a source (Deep Throat) who was employed by the government that senior aides of President Richard Nixon had paid the burglars to obtain information about his political opponents.

Sturgis was portrayed in All the President's Men, the 1976 film retelling the events of the Watergate scandal, by Ron Hale.

== Prison and later investigations ==
In January 1973, Sturgis, Hunt, Gonzalez, Martinez, Barker, G. Gordon Liddy and James W. McCord were convicted of conspiracy, burglary and wiretapping.

Sturgis was convicted in 1973 with Max Gonzalez and Jerry Buchanan in a federal court in Miami (73-597-CR-CA) of transporting cars stolen in Texas into Mexico. This prompted Drug Enforcement Administration (DEA) Acting Regional Director David W. Costa to send a letter to Judge C. Clyde Atkins on March 10, 1975, indicating that Sturgis had been covertly cooperating with the DEA. Sturgis served 14 months in the minimum security federal prison in Eglin, Florida.

Sturgis leaves the Miami federal courthouse building in handcuffs after being convicted in 1973 of taking cars stolen in Texas to Mexico.

After leaving prison, Sturgis served as a Miami police informant and continued providing intelligence on the anti-Castro activities of Dr. Orlando Bosch.

St. George's article was published in True magazine in August 1974. Sturgis claims that the Watergate burglars had been instructed to find a particular document in the Democratic Party offices. This was a "secret memorandum from the Castro government" that included details of CIA covert actions. Sturgis said "that the Castro government suspected the CIA did not tell the whole truth about these operations even to American political leaders". In response to Sturgis' repeated braggadocio to the news media, the CIA issued a public statement on May 30, 1975, indicating that he had never been connected with them "in any way."

In an interview with New York Daily News reporter Paul Meskil on June 20, 1975, Sturgis stated, "I was a spy. I was involved in assassination plots and conspiracies to overthrow several foreign governments including Cuba, Panama, Guatemala, the Dominican Republic, and Haiti. I smuggled arms and men into Cuba for Castro and against Castro. I broke into intelligence files. I stole and photographed secret documents. That's what spies do."

Sturgis was denied a pardon by President Jimmy Carter.

== John F. Kennedy assassination allegations ==
Sturgis has been the subject of various allegations regarding the assassination of President John F. Kennedy. He also made claims that other individuals were involved in the assassination of Kennedy.

Sturgis was interviewed for the 1988 Jack Anderson documentary American Expose: Who Killed JFK?.

=== Early allegations: Sturgis as one of the "three tramps" ===
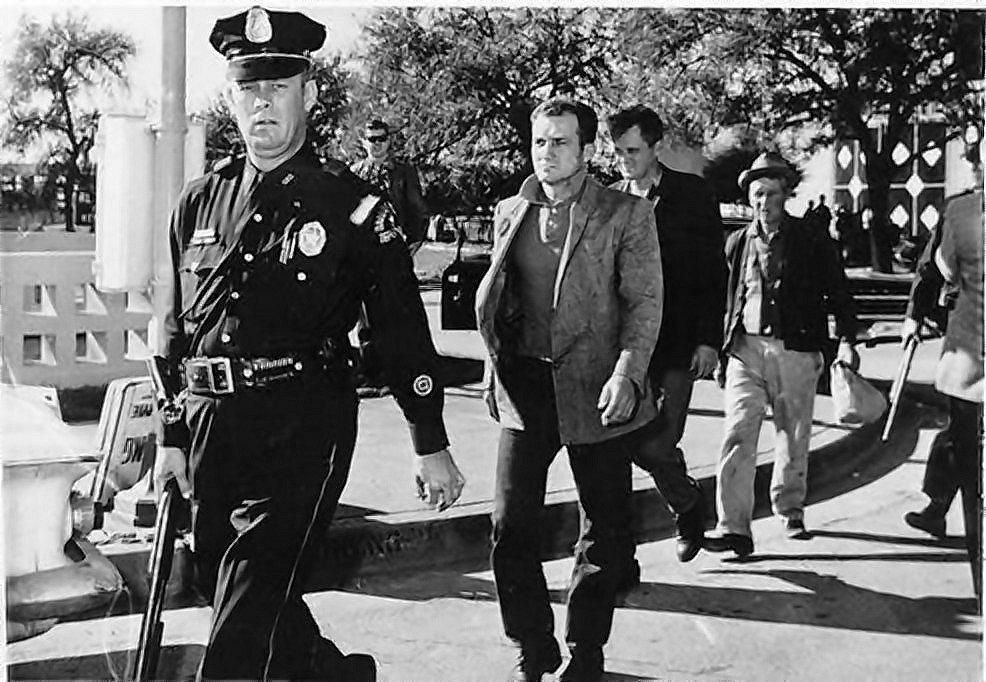
The Three Tramps, Sturgis allegedly the one in the middle

The Dallas Morning News, the Dallas Times Herald, and the Fort Worth Star-Telegram photographed three transients under police escort near the Texas School Book Depository shortly after the assassination of Kennedy. The men later became known as the "three tramps". According to Vincent Bugliosi, allegations that these men were involved in a conspiracy originated from theorist Richard E. Sprague who compiled the photographs in 1966 and 1967, and subsequently turned them over to Jim Garrison during his investigation of Clay Shaw. Appearing before a nationwide audience on the December 31, 1968, episode of The Tonight Show, Garrison held up a photo of the three and suggested they were involved in the assassination. Later, in 1974, assassination researchers Alan J. Weberman and Michael Canfield compared photographs of the men to people they believed to be suspects involved in a conspiracy and said that two of the men were Watergate burglars Hunt and Sturgis. Comedian and civil rights activist Dick Gregory helped bring national media attention to the allegations against Hunt and Sturgis in 1975 after obtaining the comparison photographs from Weberman and Canfield. Immediately after obtaining the photographs, Gregory held a press conference that received considerable coverage and his charges were reported in Rolling Stone and Newsweek.

The Rockefeller Commission reported in 1975 that they investigated the allegation that Hunt and Sturgis, on behalf of the CIA, participated in the assassination of Kennedy. The final report of that commission stated that witnesses who testified that the "derelicts" bore a resemblance to Hunt or Sturgis "were not shown to have any qualification in photo identification beyond that possessed by an average layman". Their report also stated that FBI Agent Lyndal L. Shaneyfelt, "a nationally-recognized expert in photoidentification and photoanalysis" with the FBI photographic laboratory, had concluded from photo comparison that none of the men were Hunt or Sturgis. In 1979, the House Select Committee on Assassinations reported that forensic anthropologists had again analyzed and compared the photographs of the "tramps" with those of Hunt and Sturgis, as well as with photographs of Thomas Vallee, Daniel Carswell, and Fred Crisman. According to the committee, only Chrisman resembled any of the tramps but determined that he was not to be in Dealey Plaza on the day of the assassination. In 1992, journalist Mary La Fontaine discovered the November 22, 1963, arrest records that the Dallas Police Department had released in 1989, which named the three men as Gus W. Abrams, Harold Doyle, and John F. Gedney. According to the arrest reports, the three men were "taken off a boxcar in the railroad yards right after President Kennedy was shot", detained as "investigative prisoners", described as unemployed and passing through Dallas, then released four days later.

=== Sturgis makes his own allegations ===
In 1976, Sturgis claimed that he was assigned to investigate any possible role that Cuban exiles may have played in the assassination of Kennedy. He stated that his investigation revealed that ten weeks prior to the assassination, Jack Ruby met with Fidel Castro in Havana, Cuba to discuss "the removal of the President" in order to neutralize the threat of invasion by the United States. According to Sturgis, others at the meeting included Raúl Castro, Che Guevara, Ramiro Valdés and "an Argentine woman who is believed to have been a Russian KGB agent". He said that Ruby had also made several trips to Havana in the months before the assassination in order to arrange deals in which arms would be sold to Cuba and in which illegal drugs from Cuba would be smuggled into the United States. Sturgis also claimed that Lee Harvey Oswald was involved in the conspiracy, and that other governments either were involved in the conspiracy or knew of the conspiracy. He said that his investigation did not reveal that Cuban exiles were involved in the assassination.

Sturgis declined to specifically identify the sources of his information, but noted he said that they included members of the "anti-Castro Cuban underground." He further claimed that associates of his involved in intelligence had independently confirmed his report. According to Sturgis, his report was made in early 1964 and that it was given to "certain American intelligence agencies, including the Senate Internal Security Committee." He said that he did not know if it had been forwarded to the Warren Commission. Similarly, Sturgis said that information about the 1964 reports had been provided to the Rockefeller Commission as well as the Church Committee's intelligence subcommittee chaired by Richard Schweiker, but that he did not know if they received the actual reports.

Sturgis stated he was revealing that he made the reports in order to refute "the leftist element in the country" who claimed the CIA was involved in the assassination of Kennedy. Jack Ruby's brother, Earl, responded to the allegations as "outlandish," "ridiculous," and "absolutely false".

In a 1977 television interview conducted by Bill O'Reilly, Sturgis indicated that Alexander Butterfield had notable "associations" with CIA officials, associating himself with the position taken by L. Fletcher Prouty who had made headlines nationwide with his allegation that Butterfield was operating on behalf of the CIA.

=== Marita Lorenz: Sturgis with Oswald ===
In September 1977, Marita Lorenz told Paul Meskil of the New York Daily News that she met Oswald in the fall of 1963 at an Operation 40 safe house in the Little Havana section of Miami. According to Lorenz, she met him again before the Kennedy assassination in 1963 in the house of Orlando Bosch, with Sturgis, Pedro Luis Díaz Lanz, and two other Cubans present. She said the men studied Dallas street maps and that she suspected that they were planning on raiding an arsenal. Lorenz stated that she joined the men traveling to Dallas in two cars and carrying "rifles and scopes", but flew back to Miami the day after they arrived. In response to her allegations, Sturgis said he did not recall ever meeting Oswald and reiterated his previous denials of being involved in a conspiracy to kill Kennedy.

On October 31, 1977, Sturgis was arrested in Lorenz's apartment after Lorenz told police that Sturgis threatened her in an attempt to force her to change her testimony to federal investigators. In an interview with Steve Dunleavy of the New York Post shortly after he posted bail, Sturgis said that he believed communist agents had pressured Lorenz into making the accusations against him. Later that week in Manhattan Criminal Court, charges against Sturgis were dropped after the prosecutor told the judge that his office found no evidence of coercion or harassment. Recapping the series of events, Timothy Crouse of The Village Voice described Sturgis and Lorenz as "two of the most notoriously unreliable sources in America".

=== Posthumous allegations: Hunt's "deathbed confession" ===
After the death of Hunt in 2007, John Hunt and David Hunt revealed that their father had recorded several claims about himself and others being involved in a conspiracy to assassinate John F. Kennedy. In the April 5, 2007, issue of Rolling Stone, John Hunt detailed a number of individuals implicated by his father including Sturgis, as well as Cord Meyer, David Sánchez Morales, David Atlee Phillips, William Harvey and an assassin he termed "French gunman grassy knoll" who many presume was Lucien Sarti. The two sons alleged that their father cut the information from his memoirs, American Spy: My Secret History in the CIA, Watergate and Beyond, to avoid possible perjury charges. According to Hunt's widow and other children, the two sons took advantage of Hunt's loss of lucidity by coaching and exploiting him for financial gain. The Los Angeles Times said they examined the materials offered by the sons to support the story and found them to be "inconclusive".

== Portugal, 1980: Camarate Affair ==
Sturgis is also linked to the assassination, on December 4, 1980, of Portuguese prime minister Francisco de Sá Carneiro and 6 other people aboard a Cessna aircraft, in what became known as the Camarate affair. He was named by two of his alleged accomplices, Fernando Farinha Simões and José Esteves, in a written confession, as the person who pressed the button of the detonator to activate the bomb on the plane.

== Later life ==
In 1979, Sturgis traveled to Angola to help rebels fighting the communist government, which was supported by Cuba and the Soviet Union, and to teach guerrilla warfare. In 1981 he went to Honduras to train the U.S.-backed Contras who were fighting Nicaragua's Sandinista government, which was supported by Cuba and the Soviet Union; the Army of El Salvador; and the Honduras death squads. He made a second trip to Angola and trained rebels in the Angolan bush for Holden Roberto. He interacted with Venezuelan terrorist Carlos the Jackal. In 1989 he visited Yassir Arafat in Tunis. Arafat shared elements of his peace plan, and Sturgis was debriefed by the CIA on his return.

In an obituary published December 5, 1993, The New York Times quoted Sturgis' lawyer, Ellis Rubin, as saying that Sturgis died of cancer a week after he was admitted to a veterans' hospital in Miami, five days shy of his 69th birthday. It was reported that doctors diagnosed lung cancer that had spread to his kidneys, and that he was survived by a wife, Jan, and a daughter named Autumn.

He is portrayed by actor Robert Beltran in Oliver Stone's 1995 biographical film Nixon. Later he was played by Kim Coates in the 2023 miniseries, White House Plumbers.

== Notes ==
=== Bibliography ===
- Escalante, Fabián (1995). The Secret War: CIA Covert Operations Against Cuba, 1959–62. Melbourne: Ocean Press. ISBN 1875284869. Translated by Maxine Shaw. Edited by Mirta Muñez.
- Hunt, Jim, and Bob Risch (2012). Warrior: Frank Sturgis—The CIA's #1 Assassin-Spy, Who Nearly Killed Castro But Was Ambushed by Watergate . Macmillan. ISBN 978-0765328649.
- Othen, Christopher (2022). The Men from Miami: American Rebels on Both Sides of Fidel Castro's Revolution. Biteback Publishing. ISBN 978-1785906862.
- Schlesinger, Arthur M. (Jr.) (1978). Robert Kennedy and His Times. Boston: Houghton Mifflin. ISBN 978-0233970851.
