= David Young (Watergate) =

American lawyer, businessman and academic (1936–2025)

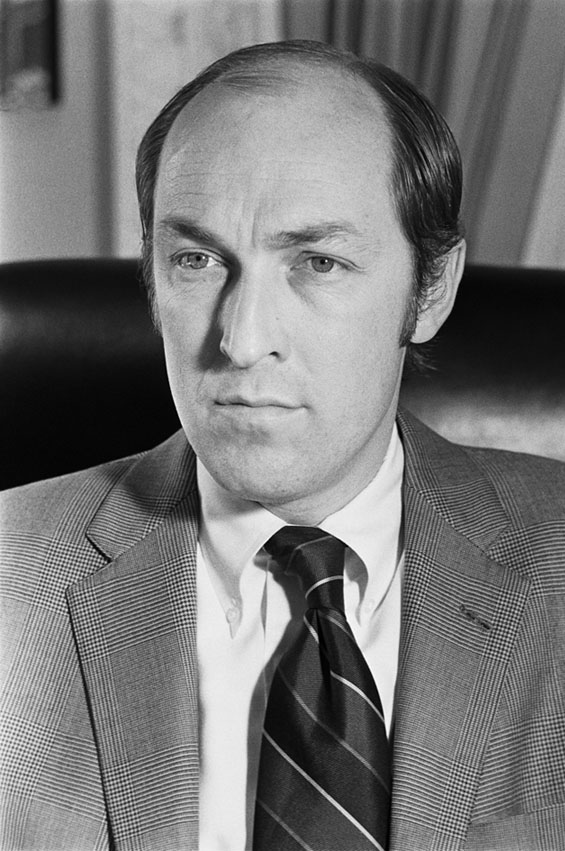

Personal details
- Born: November 11, 1936 Jersey City, New Jersey, U.S.
- Died: December 24, 2025 (aged 89) Oxford, England
- Party: Republican
- Education: Wheaton College, Illinois (BS); Queen's College, Oxford (BA); Cornell University (JD)

David Reginald Young (November 10, 1936 – December 24, 2025) was an American lawyer, businessman and academic. He served as a Special Assistant at the National Security Council in the Nixon administration and an Administrative Assistant to Henry Kissinger. He lived in the United Kingdom from the mid-1970s.

== Early life, education and early career ==
Young was born in Jersey City, New Jersey. He received degrees from Wheaton College, Illinois, and Queen's College, Oxford, as well as a Juris Doctor degree from the Law School at Cornell University, New York. In 1965, he was employed with law offices of Millbank, Tweed, Hadley and McCloy, New York.

== Joins Nixon White House ==
Young began his work for the Nixon administration in 1969 as Henry Kissinger's Administrative Assistant. In 1970 he was appointed Special Assistant to the National Security Council. In 1971, Young worked with Egil Krogh, deputy to John D. Ehrlichman. This assignment was concerned with domestic and external security.

In this role, Young investigated information leaks within the Nixon administration, ultimately being jointly responsible with Egil Krogh for the founding of the White House Special Investigations Unit, subsequently known as "The Plumbers" ("We stop leaks"). It is said that Young's grandfather was a plumber and that this was his inspiration for the name.

== Watergate involvement ==
E. Howard Hunt and G. Gordon Liddy, of the Plumbers unit, participated in clandestine (later established to be illegal) activities, the most notorious being the attempted 1971 burglary of the offices of Daniel Ellsberg's former psychiatrist and the attempted 1972 burglary of the Democratic National Committee offices at the Watergate complex.

During the investigation of these attempted burglaries, Young was granted limited immunity on the motion of the Senate Select Committee on Presidential Campaign Activities (the "Senate Watergate Investigation Committee") and the approval of United States District Judge John J. Sirica, on July 5, 1973.

Young had nothing to do with the DNC break-in. However, in return for immunity, Young testified for the prosecution in the trial of Ehrlichman and The Plumbers team that broke into the office of Ellsberg's psychiatrist. Young admitted under oath that he had deleted and removed incriminating evidence from some copies of White House files in December 1972, although he retained a complete copy of the modified file at issue and later provided that file for the prosecution.

== Move to England ==
Young subsequently returned to Queen's College, Oxford, where he completed a doctorate. He founded Oxford Analytica, a politics and economics consulting firm, from which he retired in 2015. The basis of the format for its briefings was the "Presidential Daily Brief" which he helped Henry Kissinger prepare for Nixon.

From 1975, Young also served as Lecturer in Politics at Queen's College, University of Oxford. He was a Senior Associate Member of St Antony's College, a Dominus Fellow of St Catherine's College, and Senior Common Room Member of University College. He has served as an Associate Member of the Royal Institute of International Affairs and the International Institute of Strategic Studies since 1980.

== Personal life and death ==
Young was married to Suzy, and they had five children: Bradden, Catherine, Christina, Davy and Cameron.

Young died from heart failure at his home in Oxford, on December 24, 2025, at the age of 89.

In the 2023 HBO Max miniseries White House Plumbers, Young is portrayed by Joel Van Liew.
