= William Bittman =

American trial lawyer and federal prosecutor

- Born: William Omar Bittman; August 6, 1931; Milwaukee, Wisconsin, U.S.
- Died: March 1, 2001 (aged 69); Potomac, Maryland, U.S.
- Education: Marquette University; DePaul University (JD)
- Spouse: Carole Bittman (m. 1957)
- Children: 7

William Omar Bittman (August 6, 1931 – March 1, 2001) was an American trial lawyer and federal prosecutor. He is best known for prosecuting Teamsters President Jimmy Hoffa. Bittman is also mentioned in Carl Bernstein and Bob Woodward's 1974 book, All the President's Men, which details the reporting and investigation of the Watergate scandal which led to President Nixon's resignation.

== Early life and education ==
William Bittman was born in 1931 in Milwaukee, Wisconsin. He served in the United States Navy for two years during the Korean War. Later he attended Marquette University and was the school's football captain before graduating in 1956. Three years later, in 1959, Bittman graduated from the DePaul University College of Law with honors.

== Career ==
Bittman began his legal career at the United States Attorney's Office in Chicago. He gained notoriety for the successful prosecution of Jimmy Hoffa in 1964, which set Bittman up to rise to the top ranks of Washington lawyers.

During his career as a federal prosecutor, Bittman also represented the United States against Lyndon B. Johnson's advisor and secretary of the Democratic Party Robert G. "Bobby" Baker on theft, conspiracy and tax evasion charges in 1963. Following the defense's closing arguments by Edward Bennet Williams which were lauded as "the most spellbinding arguments ever delivered to a Washington jury," Bittman began his closing saying: "You have just heard the greatest argument by the country's greatest lawyer. All I have is the facts." Baker was convicted and served 16 months in federal prison.

Following the Baker case, Bittman left prosecution and was hired by Hogan & Hartson as a defense counsel where he represented conspirator E. Howard Hunt during the Watergate scandal and later former Labor Secretary, Raymond J. Donovan, during the Reagan Administration.

== Death ==
William Bittman died at his home in Potomac, Maryland on March 1, 2001, from esophageal cancer.

In the 2023 HBO Max miniseries White House Plumbers, Bittman is portrayed by David Krumholtz.
