= Kenneth Parkinson =

American lawyer (1927–2016)

- Born: September 13, 1927; Washington D.C., U.S.
- Died: October 5, 2016 (aged 89); Tubac, Arizona, U.S.
- Occupation: Attorney-at-law
- Spouse: Pamela
- Children: Anthony, Jeffrey, Philip
- Parent(s): Kenneth and Martha

Kenneth Wells Parkinson (September 13, 1927 – October 5, 2016) was an American lawyer. He was counsel to the Committee to Re-elect the President that supported Richard Nixon in 1972. He was a member of the Watergate Seven, who were indicted by a federal grand jury on March 1, 1974. Parkinson was acquitted on January 1, 1975.
