= Virgilio Gonzalez =

Cuban-born American political activist (1926–2014)

Virgilio R. González
- Gonzalez following his arrest
- Born: May 18, 1926; Cuba
- Died: July 16, 2014 (aged 88); Miami, Florida, U.S.
- Occupation: Locksmith
- Known for: Participation in the Watergate Scandal

Virgilio "Villo" R. González (May 18, 1926 – July 16, 2014) was a Cuban-born political activist, locksmith, and one of the five men arrested at the Democratic National Committee headquarters at the Watergate complex on June 17, 1972. The break-in led to the Watergate scandal and the eventual resignation of United States President Richard Nixon two years later.

== Life before activism ==
González was originally from Cuba. He was reported to have been a house painter and barber, and to have fled Cuba after Fidel Castro took over the country in 1959. González was a personal driver for Cuban naval officer Felipe Vidal Santiago.

== Anti-government work ==
After arriving in Miami, González became involved with the anti-Castro movement in the United States and continued to work as a locksmith. His skills were greatly desired so he was recruited by an organization that did dirty work for the Nixon White House. This organization was run by E. Howard Hunt, referenced by his old CIA code name "Eduardo". Hunt was well known among the group of burglars due to his involvement in the Bay of Pigs Invasion according to Euginio Martínez.

=== Watergate involvement ===
Due to his skills as a locksmith and his connection to Eugenio Martínez, González was recruited to the crew of Watergate burglars. The first attempt at the break-in was at 12 o'clock at night. This failed when González did not have the right tools to get into the Democratic Party office. Because of this, Hunt had González go back to his shop in Miami to gather the correct tools for the door. They returned and attempted the break-in once again. This time González was successful in picking the locks and they were able to place bugs in three of the phones in the headquarters.

The group was required to break in once again, to take 1,440 photos of Democratic Party papers, and to retrieve the bugs planted before. González had no problems with the lock this time having cracked it before. The group noticed that one of the three bug tapes placed before had gone missing. The group instead of taking the warning decided to continue taking pictures of the documents. Shortly afterward the group was discovered and arrested. He pleaded guilty and spent a 13-month stint in prison for his crimes.

González was portrayed in All the President's Men, the 1976 film retelling the events of the Watergate scandal, by Nate Esformes. In the 2023 TV mini-series White House Plumbers, he was played by Nelson Ascencio.

== Post scandal ==
After serving his sentence in prison for the burglary, González reportedly disliked talking to reporters about the Watergate scandal. In 2012, it was reported that he was living in Miami with his second wife. González left the lock picking business and later ran a mechanic shop, and when asked if he was happy, responded "Of course, I am living again". He died in Miami on July 16, 2014, at the age of 88.

== See also ==
- Watergate Seven
