= Harlot's Ghost =

1991 book by Norman Mailer

- First edition
- Author: Norman Mailer
- Language: English
- Publisher: Random House
- Publication date: October 1991
- Publication place: United States
- Media type: Print (hardcover and paperback)
- Pages: 1,310 (hardcover)
- ISBN: 978-0394588322
- Dewey Decimal: 813/.54
- LC Class: PS3525.A4152 H37 1991

Harlot's Ghost is a novel by Norman Mailer, published by Random House in 1991. The book is a fictional chronicle of the Central Intelligence Agency. The characters are a mixture of real people and fictional figures. At over 1,300 pages, the book is Mailer's longest.

== Summary ==
At first it appears to be the autobiography of Harry Hubbard, which is made up of anecdotes of his life and actions with the CIA, covert operations in Uruguay, the aftermath of the Cuban Revolution, the Bay of Pigs Invasion, the Mafia in the 60s and the assassination of JFK. The very beginning of the book starts with Harry being told by a friend that his mentor Hugh Montague (a top level CIA officer) has either been assassinated or committed suicide on his boat. He then is told by his wife, Kittredge (a CIA member), that she has been unfaithful and is in love with another high level CIA intelligence officer. Under perceived threat of his own assassination by the CIA he escapes to Moscow. It is there that he rereads in a hotel room the dense manuscript of his life at the CIA which he has documented and kept secret over his career. At that point, the book really begins. It details the life of a CIA intelligence officer who has connections to the highest levels of the CIA. It raises basic questions about the fight against Communism and goes into the Cuban Revolution and the Cuban Missile Crisis and, perhaps most importantly, raises questions about the assassination of JFK and who was ultimately responsible.

Mailer had planned to write a sequel – Harlot's Grave – but other projects intervened and the sequel was never written. Harlot's Ghost ends with the words "To be continued".
