= Fred LaRue =

American presidential aide (1928–2004)

- Born: October 11, 1928; Athens, Texas, US
- Died: July 24, 2004 (aged 75); Biloxi, Mississippi, US
- Spouse: Joyce Burlson LaRue

Frederick Cheney LaRue Sr. (October 11, 1928 – July 24, 2004) was an aide in the administration of U.S. President Richard Nixon. He served a short prison sentence for his role in the Watergate break-in and the subsequent Watergate scandal and cover-up.

Oddly, LaRue had no rank, title, salary, or even listing in the White House directory. LaRue was present at an early meeting with his friend, United States Attorney General John N. Mitchell, at which the Watergate burglary was planned. Afterwards, LaRue assisted the cover-up, supervising the shredding of documents and the destruction of financial records.

== Biography ==
In 1957, LaRue accidentally shot and killed his father while hunting with friends in Canada.

With his newfound wealth, LaRue invested in many failed business ventures including casinos in Havana, Cuba, prior to the communist revolution, and in Las Vegas, Nevada. He also used his wealth to become a political financier and served as a member of the Republican National Committee from 1963 until 1968.

He was a heavy financial contributor to Barry Goldwater's presidential campaign in 1964. He was also a longtime friend of the Mississippi Democratic U.S. Senator James Eastland.

After Goldwater lost the election, LaRue began getting involved with Nixon's career. LaRue was one of the principal planners of Nixon's so-called "Southern strategy" for winning the election. He coordinated with the campaign office of Strom Thurmond, the veteran U.S. Senator from South Carolina.

=== Nixon supporter, advisor to Attorney General John Mitchell ===
LaRue also recommended the use of a "special ballad-type song in the current country-and-western music style, by which nationally famous artists will sing the message via the radio and TV." The song was called "Bring Our Country Back" and included "alternate" lyrics with the couplet: "Dick Nixon is a decent man/Who can bring our country back." LaRue proposed broadcasting the song by local radio and television programs throughout the South. However, he had difficulty finding artists to perform the song; most that he contacted either sympathized with George Wallace, the former governor of Alabama, or did not want to help Nixon. Eventually, LaRue managed to convince Roy Acuff and Tex Ritter, who were unsuccessful Republican candidates themselves for governor and U.S. senator, respectively, in the state of Tennessee, to perform versions of the song.

LaRue coordinated with Eastland to obtain the confirmation of Nixon's judicial nominees. He has been described as a special assistant in an "advisory capacity" to then Attorney General Mitchell.

On March 30, 1972, LaRue attended a meeting in Key Biscayne, Florida, with Mitchell and Jeb Magruder. Mitchell, having announced his resignation as attorney general on February 15, assumed his new duties as head of the Committee to Re-elect the President, effective on March 1. The March 30 meeting has been the subject of great dispute among its three participants. According to Magruder, the three men approved the so-called Operation Gemstone and other aspects of a "dirty tricks" campaign against the Democratic Party. LaRue and Mitchell, to their deaths, always denied this vehemently. In 2003, Magruder stated, for the first time, that it was at this meeting that President Nixon, speaking to Mitchell by telephone, voiced specific approval for the Watergate burglary. Mitchell and Nixon had both been dead for years, and Fred LaRue denied Magruder's claim publicly.

==== "Bagman" for Watergate burglary pay-off ====
LaRue was known as the "bagman" because he delivered more than $300,000 in cash ("hush money") to the conspirators and their attorneys to keep participants of the Watergate burglary quiet. LaRue was the first Administration official to plead guilty to crimes related to his involvement with the Watergate burglary and the cover-up.

He pleaded guilty to obstruction of justice on June 27, 1973 and served four and a half months in custody at the Maxwell Air Force Base near Montgomery, Alabama. LaRue's fellow Watergate-convicts John Mitchell and Charles Colson also served their prison time at Maxwell AFB.

=== Life after prison ===
LaRue refused to testify against Nixon or any other Watergate figure. One of Nixon's first public appearances after his resignation as president came three years later in 1977 at a "Salute to the Military" in Biloxi, directed by LaRue.

LaRue died in Biloxi, Mississippi on July 24, 2004.
