= White House Plumbers =

1971 covert U.S. government group

The White House Plumbers, sometimes simply called the Plumbers, the Room 16 Project, ODESSA or more officially, the White House Special Investigations Unit, was a covert White House Special Investigations Unit, established within a week of the publication of the Pentagon Papers in June 1971, during the presidency of Richard Nixon. Its task was to stop and/or respond to the leaking of classified information, such as the Pentagon Papers, to the news media. The work of the unit "tapered off" after the bungled "Ellsberg break-in" but some of its former operatives branched into illegal activities while still employed at the White House together with managers of the Committee for the Re-Election of the President, including the Watergate break-in and the ensuing Watergate scandal. The group has been described as Nixon's "fixers".

== Name ==
On Thanksgiving 1971, David Young arrived home from his planning at the Special Investigative Unit, when his grandmother asked him, "What do you do at the White House?", he replied, "I am helping the president stop some leaks", purposely playing off on information leak versus water leak. She exclaimed, "Oh, you're a plumber!" Young, E. Howard Hunt, and G. Gordon Liddy then put up a sign on their office with the title "The Plumbers", but it was taken down as their operations were intended to be top secret. Still, the name stuck for the group.

== Members ==
The Plumbers came to include several Watergate figures including Frank Sturgis. Hunt was recommended by Charles Colson, and Liddy was recommended by Egil Krogh. Liddy coined his own sensitivity indicator for the group in the form of "ODESSA". ODESSA stood for "Organisation der ehemaligen SS-Angehörigen," Liddy termed the unit's mission as "directed to eliminate subversion of the secrets of the administration." He marked the Plumbers' official papers with the moniker.

Central Intelligence Agency officer John Paisley worked with the Plumbers through the CIA's Office of Security, of which Nixon campaign security coordinator and Watergate burglar James McCord was once a member. On August 9, 1971, Young's memo indicates he met with Paisley and OS Director Howard Osborn, in which Paisley provided a list of objectives for the Special Investigations Unit.

== Operations ==
The Plumbers' first task was the burglary of the Los Angeles office of psychiatrist Lewis J. Fielding, in an effort to uncover evidence to discredit Daniel Ellsberg (a client of the psychiatrist) who had leaked the Pentagon Papers. The operation was reportedly unsuccessful in finding Ellsberg's file and was thus reported to the White House. However, Fielding himself stated the file was in his office; he found it on the floor on the morning after the burglary and quite clearly, someone had gone through it. In a September 1971 conversation, John Ehrlichman advised Nixon, "We had one little operation; it's been aborted out in Los Angeles which, I think, is better that you don't know about." Eventually, the case against Ellsberg was dismissed due to government misconduct.

Aside from the Fielding burglary, there are few other activities the Plumbers were known to have been engaged in. Hunt reportedly looked into the Ted Kennedy-Chappaquiddick incident; and Liddy reported the alleged involvement of the Kennedy administration in the assassination of South Vietnamese president Ngo Dinh Diem.

After the California break-in, Liddy—who was general counsel, a member of the finance committee of the Committee to Re-elect the President (CRP) and promoted from aide to Krogh and Young—worked with Campaign political-intelligence operations. Ehrlichman, the Assistant to the President for Domestic Affairs and Special Investigations Unit, knew about Liddy's goal to perform an intelligence-gathering operation for the CRP. Liddy involved Hunt in the operations which would later include the Watergate burglary.
