= E. Howard Hunt =

American intelligence officer and author (1918–2007)

Howard Hunt
- Hunt in September 1973
- Born: Everette Howard Hunt Jr. October 9, 1918; Hamburg, New York, U.S.
- Died: January 23, 2007 (aged 88); Miami, Florida, U.S.
- Education: Brown University (BA)
- Criminal charges: Conspiracy, burglary, illegal wiretapping
- Criminal penalty: 2.5 to 8 years Paroled after 33 months
- Spouse(s): Dorothy Wetzel (died 1972); Laura Martin
- Children: 4 (with Wetzel); 2 (with Martin)
- Espionage activity
- Allegiance: United States
- Service branch: United States Navy; United States Army Air Forces; Office of Strategic Services; Central Intelligence Agency; White House Plumbers
- Service years: 1940–1945 (Army); 1949–1970 (CIA)
- Codename: Robert Dietrich; Gordon Davis; David St. John; Edward Warren; Edward J. Hamilton; Hugh W. Newstead; Eduardo
- Operations: 1954 Guatemalan coup d'état Brigade 2506; Watergate scandal

Everette Howard Hunt Jr. (October 9, 1918 – January 23, 2007) was an American intelligence officer and author. From 1949 to 1970, Hunt served as an officer in the Central Intelligence Agency (CIA), where he was a central figure in U.S. regime change in Latin America including the 1954 Guatemalan coup d'état and the attempted 1961 Bay of Pigs Invasion in Cuba. Along with G. Gordon Liddy, Frank Sturgis, and others, Hunt was one of the Nixon administration's so-called White House Plumbers, a team of operatives charged with identifying government leaks to outside parties.

Hunt and Liddy plotted the Watergate burglaries and other clandestine operations for the Nixon administration. In the Watergate scandal, Hunt was convicted of burglary, conspiracy, and wiretapping, and was sentenced to 33 months in prison. After his release, Hunt lived in Mexico and then Miami until his death in January 2007. Hunt was the subject of pervasive conspiracy theories regarding the assassination of John F. Kennedy, with his sons taping a disputed deathbed confession.

== Early life and education ==
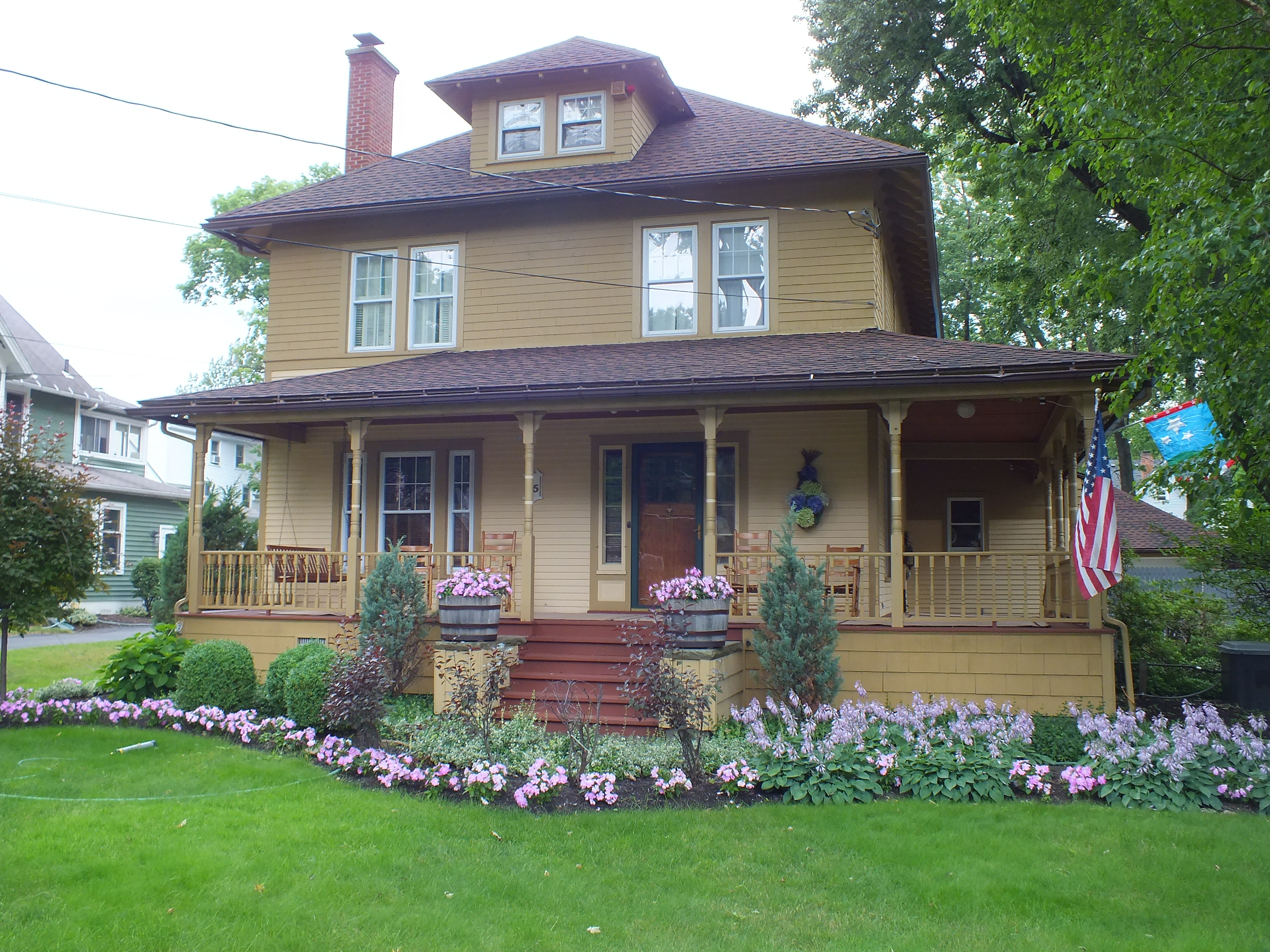
Hunt's birthplace in Hamburg, New York

Hunt was born in Hamburg, New York, the son of Ethel Jean (Totterdale) and Everette Howard Hunt Sr., an attorney and Republican Party official.

He attended Hamburg High School in Hamburg, N.Y., where he graduated in 1936 along with classmate Howard J. Osborn. He then attended Brown University, an Ivy League university in Providence, Rhode Island, where he graduated in 1940.

== Career ==
=== U.S. military and OSS ===
During World War II, Hunt served in the U.S. Navy on the destroyer USS Mayo and the U.S. Army Air Corps. He also served in China with the Office of Strategic Services (OSS), the precursor to the Central Intelligence Agency.

=== Author ===
Hunt was a prolific author, publishing 73 books during his lifetime. During and after World War II, he wrote several novels under his own name, including East of Farewell (1942), Limit of Darkness (1944), Stranger in Town (1947), Maelstrom (1949), Bimini Run (1949), and The Violent Ones (1950). He also wrote spy and hardboiled novels under an array of pseudonyms, including Robert Dietrich, Gordon Davis, David St. John, and P. S. Donoghue.

Some parallels exist between Hunt's writings and his experiences during the Watergate scandal and espionage. He continued his writing career after he was released from prison, publishing nearly twenty spy thrillers between 1980 and 2000.

In 1946, Hunt was awarded a Guggenheim Fellowship for his writing.

=== Economic Cooperation Administration ===
Prior to 1949, Hunt served as an officer in the Information Division of the Economic Cooperation Administration, a predecessor of the Mutual Security Agency.

=== Central Intelligence Agency ===
Shortly following the end of World War II, the OSS was disbanded. In 1947, with the Cold War emerging and intensifying, the absence of a central intelligence organization was seen as a national security deficiency, and the Central Intelligence Agency (CIA) was formed. In October 1949, just as Warner Bros. acquired the rights to Hunt's novel Bimini Run, Hunt joined the CIA's Office of Policy Coordination (OPC). He was assigned as a covert action officer specializing in political action and influence in what later came to be the CIA's Special Activities Center.

==== Mexico City ====
In 1950, Hunt was appointed OPC Station Chief in Mexico City, where he recruited and supervised William F. Buckley Jr., who worked under Hunt in his OPC Station in Mexico from 1951 to 1952. Buckley and Hunt remained lifelong friends, and Buckley became godfather to Hunt's first three children.

In Mexico, Hunt helped lay the framework for Operation PBFortune, later renamed Operation PBSuccess, the successful covert operation to overthrow Jacobo Árbenz, the democratically elected president of Guatemala. Hunt would later say, "What we wanted to do was to have a terror campaign, to terrify Arbenz particularly, to terrify his troops, much as the German Stuka bombers terrified the population of Holland, Belgium and Poland."

Hunt was then assigned as Chief of Covert Action in Japan, and later as Chief of Station in Uruguay, where he was noted by American diplomatic contemporary Samuel F. Hart for controversial working methods.

==== Bay of Pigs invasion ====
Hunt was subsequently assigned responsibility for organizing Cuban exile leaders in the United States into a suitably representative government-in-exile that would, after the Bay of Pigs Invasion, form a pro-American government that could replace Fidel Castro.

Planning for the Bay of Pigs invasion began during the Eisenhower administration, but Hunt was later bitter about what he perceived as President John F. Kennedy's lack of commitment to the operation, which was designed to attack and overthrow the Castro government. In his semi-fictional autobiography, Give Us This Day, Hunt wrote, "The Kennedy administration yielded Castro all the excuse he needed to gain a tighter grip on the island of José Martí, then moved shamefacedly into the shadows and hoped the Cuban issue would simply melt away."

In 1959, Hunt helped CIA Director Allen W. Dulles write The Craft of Intelligence. The following year, in 1960, Hunt established Brigade 2506, a CIA-sponsored group of Cuban exiles formed to attempt the military overthrow of the Castro's government in Cuba. The Bay of Pigs invasion commenced on April 17, 1961, but was quickly aborted and viewed as a fiasco. Hunt was then reassigned as executive assistant to Dulles. In 1961, President Kennedy fired Dulles for the failed Bay of Pigs invasion.

Hunt then served from 1962 to 1964 as the first Chief of Covert Action for the CIA's Domestic Operations Division (DODS).

In 1974, Hunt told The New York Times that he worked for DODS for approximately four years, beginning in 1962, shortly after the agency's establishment by the Kennedy administration over the objection of Richard Helms and Thomas H. Karamessines. Hunt said that the division was assembled shortly after the Bay of Pigs operation, and that "many men connected with that failure were shunted into the new domestic unit." He said that some of his projects from 1962 to 1966 dealt largely with subsidizing and manipulating news and publishing organizations in the United States, which he said "did seem to violate the intent of the agency's charter."

In 1964, John A. McCone, then deputy chief of intelligence at the CIA, directed Hunt to take a special assignment as a Non-official cover officer in Madrid, Spain, tasked with creating an American answer to Ian Fleming's British MI-6 James Bond novel series. While in Spain, Hunt was covered as a recently retired U.S. State Department Foreign Service Officer who moved his family to Spain in order to write the first installment of the nine-novel Peter Ward series, On Hazardous Duty, published in 1965.

After a year and a half in Spain, Hunt returned to his assignment at DODS. Following a brief tenure on the Special Activities Staff of the Western European Division, he became Chief of Covert Action for the region in July 1968, and was based in the Washington metropolitan area. Hunt was lauded for his "sagacity, balance and imagination", and received the second-highest rating of Strong signifying "performance ... characterized by exceptional proficiency" in a performance review from the Division's Chief of Operations in April 1969. However, this was downgraded to the third-highest rating of "Adequate" in an amended review from the Division's Deputy Chief, who recognized Hunt's "broad experience" but opined that "a series of personal and taxing problems" had "tended to dull his cutting edge."

Hunt later said that he "had been stigmatized by the Bay of Pigs", and had come to terms with the fact that he "would not get promoted too much higher."

In his final years with the CIA, Hunt began to cultivate new contacts in society and the business world. While serving as vice president of Brown University's club in Washington, D.C., he befriended and commenced a strong association with the organization's president, former congressional aide Charles Colson, who was working on Richard Nixon's presidential campaign.

=== CIA retirement ===
Hunt retired from the CIA at the pay grade of GS-15, Step 8 on April 30, 1970.

After retiring from the CIA, Hunt neglected to elect survivorship benefits for his wife. In April 1971, he requested to retroactively amend his election but was rebuffed by the agency. In a May 5, 1972, letter to CIA General Counsel Lawrence Houston, Hunt raised the possibility of returning to active duty for a short period of time in exchange for activating the benefits upon his proposed second retirement. Houston advised Hunt in his May 16, 1972, response that this "would be in violation of the spirit of the CIA Retirement Act".

=== Robert R. Mullen Company ===
Immediately following his retirement, Hunt went to work for the Robert R. Mullen Company, which cooperated with the CIA; H. R. Haldeman, White House Chief of Staff to President Nixon, wrote in 1978 that the Mullen Company was in fact a CIA front company, a fact that was apparently unknown to Haldeman while he worked in the White House. Through CIA's Project QKENCHANT, Hunt obtained a Covert Security Approval to handle the firm's affairs during Mullen's absence from Washington.

=== White House ===
In 1971, Colson, who was then director of Nixon's Office of Public Liaison, hired Hunt, where he joined the White House Special Investigations Unit, specializing in political sabotage.

Hunt's first assignment for the White House was a covert operation to break into the Los Angeles office of Daniel Ellsberg's psychiatrist, Lewis J. Fielding. In July 1971, Fielding refused a request from the Federal Bureau of Investigation for psychiatric data on Ellsberg. Hunt and Liddy cased the building in late August. The burglary, on September 3, 1971, was not detected, but no Ellsberg files were found.

In the summer of 1971, Colson authorized Hunt to travel to New England to seek potentially scandalous information on Senator Edward Kennedy related to the Chappaquiddick incident and Kennedy's possible extramarital affairs. Hunt sought and used CIA disguises and other equipment for the project. The mission eventually proved unsuccessful, with little useful information uncovered by Hunt.

Hunt's White House duties included assassination-related disinformation. In September 1971, Hunt forged top-secret U.S. State Department cables designed to prove that President Kennedy had personally and specifically ordered the assassination of South Vietnam President Ngo Dinh Diem and his brother, Ngô Đình Nhu, during the 1963 South Vietnamese coup. He offered the forged documents to a Life magazine reporter. Hunt later told the Senate Watergate Committee in 1973 that he fabricated the cables to show a link between President Kennedy and the assassination of Diem, a Catholic, to estrange Catholic voters from the Democratic Party, after Colson suggested he "might be able to improve upon the record."

In 1972, on Colson's orders, Hunt and G. Gordon Liddy were part of an assassination plot targeting journalist Jack Anderson. Nixon disliked Anderson because Anderson published a 1960 election-eve story about a secret loan from Howard Hughes to Nixon's brother, which Nixon believed was a factor in his election defeat to John F. Kennedy. Hunt and Liddy met with a CIA operative and discussed methods of assassinating Anderson, which included covering Anderson's car steering wheel with LSD to drug him and cause a fatal accident, poisoning his aspirin bottle, and staging a fatal robbery. The assassination plot never materialized because Hunt and Liddy were arrested for their involvement in the Watergate scandal later that year.

==== Watergate scandal ====
Seymour Hersh reported in The New Yorker that the Nixon White House tapes show that, following the assassination attempt on George Wallace on May 15, 1972, Nixon and Colson agreed to send Hunt to the Milwaukee home of the gunman, Arthur Bremer, to place McGovern presidential campaign material there. The intention was to link Bremer with the Democrats. Hersh wrote that, in a taped conversation:

Nixon is energized and excited by what seems to be the ultimate political dirty trick: the FBI and the Milwaukee police will be convinced, and will tell the world, that the attempted assassination of Wallace had its roots in left-wing Democratic politics.

Hunt did not make the trip, however, because the FBI moved quickly to seal Bremer's apartment and place it under police guard.

In his memoir Hunt reports that the day after the assassination attempt he received a call from Chuck Colson, asking him to break into Bremer's apartment and plant "leftist literature to connect him to the Democrats". Hunt recalls that he was highly sceptical of the plan due to the apartment being guarded by the FBI but investigated the feasibility of it anyway due to Colson's insistence.

Later that year, Hunt organized the bugging of the Democratic National Committee at the Watergate complex office building. On June 18, 1972, five burglars were arrested by police at the Watergate. Hunt and Liddy were indicted on federal charges three months later.

Hunt put pressure on the White House and the Committee for the Re-Election of the President for cash payments to cover legal fees, family support, and expenses, for himself and his fellow burglars. Key Nixon figures, including Haldeman, Charles Colson, Herbert W. Kalmbach, John Mitchell, Fred LaRue, and John Dean eventually became entangled in the payoff schemes. Large sums of money were passed to Hunt and his accomplices in an attempt to secure their silence at the trial, by pleading guilty to avoid prosecutors' questions, and afterwards.

The Washington Post and The New York Times later reported on the payoff scheme, publishing many articles that proved to be the beginning of the end for the cover-up since prosecutors felt obligated to follow up on the media reports. Hunt also pressured Colson, Dean, and John Ehrlichman to ask Nixon for clemency in sentencing, and eventual presidential pardons for himself and his Watergate break-in partners, which eventually helped implicate and snare those higher up.

Hunt was sentenced to 30 months to eight years in prison for his role in the Watergate scandal, and spent 33 months in prison at Federal Correctional Complex, Allenwood, and the low-security Federal Prison Camp at Eglin Air Force Base, Florida, on a conspiracy charge; he arrived at the Eglin Air Force Base prison on April 25, 1975. While at Allenwood, Hunt suffered a mild stroke.

== JFK conspiracy allegations ==
Hunt supported the Warren Commission's conclusion that Lee Harvey Oswald acted alone in the assassination of John F. Kennedy.

=== Three tramps ===
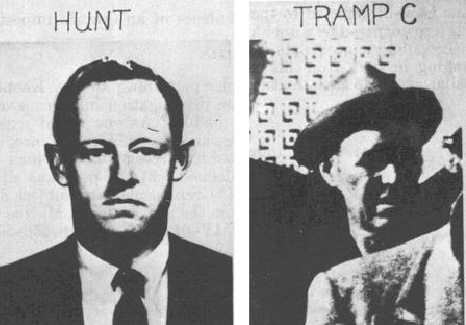
E. Howard Hunt and one of the three tramps arrested after the assassination of President Kennedy

Shortly after the assassination of John F. Kennedy in Dallas, The Dallas Morning News, the Dallas Times Herald, and the Fort Worth Star-Telegram photographed three transients under police escort near the Texas School Book Depository. The men were later known as the three tramps.

According to Vincent Bugliosi, allegations that these men were involved in a conspiracy originated from theorist Richard E. Sprague who compiled the photographs in 1966 and 1967, and subsequently turned them over to Jim Garrison during his investigation of Clay Shaw. Appearing before a nationwide audience on the January 31, 1968, episode of The Tonight Show, Garrison held up a photo of the three and suggested they were involved in the assassination.

Several years later, in 1974, assassination researchers Alan J. Weberman and Michael Canfield compared photographs of the men to people they believed to be suspects involved in a conspiracy and said that two of the men were Hunt and fellow Watergate conspirator Frank Sturgis. In 1975, comedian and civil rights activist Dick Gregory helped bring national media attention to the allegations against Hunt and Sturgis after obtaining the comparison photographs from Weberman and Canfield. Immediately after obtaining the photographs, Gregory held a press conference that received considerable coverage, including in Rolling Stone and Newsweek.

In 1975, the U.S. President's Commission on CIA Activities within the United States, also known as the Rockefeller Commission, investigated the allegation that Hunt and Sturgis, on behalf of the CIA, participated in Kennedy's assassination. The commission's final report stated that witnesses testified that the derelicts bore a resemblance to Hunt or Sturgis "were not shown to have any qualifications in photo identification beyond that possessed by an average layman". Their report also stated that FBI Agent Lyndal L. Shaneyfelt, "a nationally-recognized expert in photo-identification and photoanalysis" with the FBI photographic laboratory, had concluded from photo comparison that none of the men was Hunt or Sturgis.

In 1979, the U.S. House Select Committee on Assassinations reported that forensic anthropologists had again analyzed and compared the photographs of the tramps with those of Hunt and Sturgis and also with photographs of Thomas Vallee, Daniel Carswell, and Fred Crisman. According to the committee, only Crisman resembled any of the tramps, but determined that he was not in Dealey Plaza on the day of Kennedy's assassination.

In 1992, journalist Mary La Fontaine discovered the November 22, 1963, arrest records that the Dallas Police Department had released in 1989, which named the three men as Gus W. Abrams, Harold Doyle, and John F. Gedney. According to the arrest reports, the three men were "taken off a boxcar in the railroad yards right after President Kennedy was shot", detained as "investigative prisoners", described as unemployed and passing through Dallas, then released four days later.

=== Compulsive Spy ===
In 1973, Viking Press published Compulsive Spy, a book about Hunt's career, by Tad Szulc, a former correspondent for The New York Times. Szulc wrote that unnamed CIA sources told him that Hunt, working with Rolando Cubela Secades, had a role in coordinating the assassination of Castro during an aborted second invasion of Cuba after the failed Bay of Pigs invasion. Szulc wrote that Hunt was the acting chief of the CIA station in Mexico City in 1963 while Lee Harvey Oswald was also in Mexico City. (Note: Szulc wrote: "As I mentioned above, Hunt spent August and September 1963 in Mexico City in charge of the CIA station there.")

In June 1975, the Rockefeller Commission investigated allegations that the CIA, including Hunt, may have had contact with Oswald or Jack Ruby, concluding that one "witness testified that E. Howard Hunt was Acting Chief of a CIA Station in Mexico City in 1963, implying that he could have had contact with Oswald when Oswald visited Mexico City in September 1963." The report concluded, however, that there was "no credible evidence" of CIA involvement in the assassination, reporting that, "At no time was [Hunt] ever the Chief, or Acting Chief, of a CIA Station in Mexico City.

Released in the Fall of 1975 after the Rockefeller Commission's report, Weberman and Canfield's book Coup d'Etat in America reiterated Szulc's allegation. (Note: Weberman and Canfield wrote: "According to former Times reporter Tad Szulc, Howard Hunt just happened to be CIA station chief in Mexico City in August–September 1963.") In July 1976, Hunt filed a $2.5 million libel suit against the authors and the book's publishers and editor. According to Ellis Rubin, Hunt's attorney who filed the suit in a Miami federal court, the book said that Hunt took part in the assassination of Kennedy and Martin Luther King Jr.

As part of his suit, Hunt filed a legal action in the United States District Court for the Eastern District of Virginia in September 1978 requesting that Szulc be cited for contempt if he refused to divulge his sources. Three months earlier, Szulc stated in a deposition that he refused to name his sources due to "the professional confidentiality of sources" and "journalistic privilege". Rubin said that knowing the source of the allegation that Hunt was in Mexico City in 1963 was important because Szulc's passage "is what everybody uses as an authority ... he's cited in everything written on E. Howard Hunt". He added that rumors that Hunt was involved in the Kennedy assassination might be put to end if Szulc's source was revealed. Stating that Hunt had not provided a sufficient reason to override Szulc's First Amendment rights to protect the confidentiality of his sources, Albert Vickers Bryan Jr., the U.S. District Court judge, ruled in favor of Szulc. In 1982, six years after first filing the libel suit, Hunt dropped the suit.

=== Libel suit: Liberty Lobby and The Spotlight ===
On November 3, 1978, Hunt gave a security-classified deposition for the House Select Committee on Assassinations (HSCA). He denied knowledge of any conspiracy to kill Kennedy. The Assassination Records Review Board (ARRB) released the deposition in February 1996. Two newspaper articles published a few months before the deposition stated that a 1966 CIA memo linking Hunt to the assassination of President Kennedy had recently been provided to the HSCA. The first article, by Victor Marchetti – author of the book The CIA and the Cult of Intelligence (1974) – appeared in the Liberty Lobby newspaper The Spotlight on August 14, 1978.

According to Marchetti, the memo said in essence, "Some day we will have to explain Hunt's presence in Dallas on November 22, 1963." He also wrote that Hunt, Frank Sturgis and Gerry Patrick Hemming would soon be implicated in a conspiracy to kill John F. Kennedy.

The second article, by Joseph J. Trento and Jacquie Powers, appeared six days later in the Sunday edition of The News Journal, Wilmington, Delaware. It alleged that the purported memo was initialed by Richard Helms and James Angleton and showed that, shortly after Helms and Angleton were elevated to their highest positions in the CIA, they discussed the fact that Hunt had been in Dallas on the day of the Kennedy assassination and that his presence there had to be kept secret. However, nobody has been able to produce this supposed memo, and the United States President's Commission on CIA Activities within the United States determined that Hunt had been in Washington, D.C., on the day of the assassination.

Hunt sued Liberty Lobby – but not the Sunday News Journal – for libel. Liberty Lobby stipulated, in this first trial, that the question of Hunt's alleged involvement in the assassination would not be contested. Hunt prevailed and was awarded $650,000 in damages. In 1983, however, the case was overturned on appeal because of error in jury instructions.

In a second trial, held in 1985, Mark Lane made an issue of Hunt's location on the day of the Kennedy assassination. Lane successfully defended Liberty Lobby by producing evidence suggesting that Hunt had been in Dallas. He used depositions from David Atlee Phillips, Richard Helms, Liddy, Stansfield Turner and Marita Lorenz, plus a cross-examination of Hunt. On retrial, the jury rendered a verdict for Liberty Lobby.

Lane claimed he convinced the jury that Hunt was a JFK assassination conspirator. The foreperson of the jury, Leslie Armstrong, told the media that the CIA killed Kennedy and that Hunt was involved, although some of the other jurors who were interviewed by the media said they disregarded the conspiracy theory and judged the case (according to the judge's jury instructions) on whether the article was published with "reckless disregard for the truth." Lane outlined his theory about Hunt's and the CIA's role in Kennedy's murder in a 1991 book, Plausible Denial.

=== Mitrokhin Archive ===
Former KGB archivist Vasili Mitrokhin indicated in 1999 that Hunt was made part of a fabricated conspiracy theory disseminated by a Soviet "active measures" program designed to discredit the CIA and the United States. According to Mitrokhin, the KGB created a forged letter from Oswald to Hunt implying that the two were linked as conspirators, then forwarded copies of it to "three of the most active conspiracy buffs" in 1975. Mitrokhin indicated that the photocopies were accompanied by a fake cover letter from an anonymous source alleging that the original had been given to FBI Director Clarence M. Kelley and was apparently being suppressed.

=== Kerry Thornley's memoir ===
According to Kerry Thornley, who served with Oswald in the Marine Corps and wrote the biographical book The Idle Warriors about him before the assassination of the president (the manuscript was seized during the investigation and was kept as physical evidence for a long time).

Thornley regularly met with a man in New Orleans known to him as Gary Kirstein, with whom they discussed the assassination of John F. Kennedy. Also, according to Thornley, Kirstein in those years wanted to organize the assassination of Martin Luther King Jr. and planned to "frame a jailbird for it." In "Confession to Conspiracy to Assassinate JFK by Kerry Thornley as told to Sondra London" he said that after Watergate, when photos of Howard Hunt appeared in the media, he found that he was very similar to his acquaintance Kirstein, along with whom they discussed organizing the assassination of the president.

=== Deathbed confession of involvement in Kennedy assassination ===
After Hunt's death, Howard St. John Hunt and David Hunt stated that their father had recorded several claims about himself and others being involved in a conspiracy to assassinate John F. Kennedy. Notes and audio recordings were made.

In the April 5, 2007, issue of Rolling Stone, St. John Hunt detailed a number of individuals purported to be implicated by his father, including Lyndon B. Johnson, Cord Meyer, David Atlee Phillips, Frank Sturgis, David Morales, Antonio Veciana, William Harvey, and an assassin he termed "French gunman-grassy knoll" who many presume is Lucien Sarti. The two sons alleged that their father cut the information from his memoirs to avoid possible perjury charges. According to Hunt's widow and other children, the two sons took advantage of Hunt's loss of lucidity by coaching and exploiting him for financial gain and furthermore falsified accounts of Hunt's supposed confession. The Los Angeles Times said they examined the materials offered by the sons to support the story and found them to be "inconclusive".

== Memoirs ==
=== American Spy: My Secret History in the CIA, Watergate, and Beyond ===
Hunt's memoir, American Spy: My Secret History in the CIA, Watergate, and Beyond, was ghostwritten by Greg Aunapu and published by John Wiley & Sons in March 2007.

According to the Hunt Literary Estate, Hunt had intended to write an update to his 1974 autobiography Undercover and supplement this edition with post-9/11 reflections, but by the time he had embarked on the project, he was too ill to continue. This prompted John Wiley & Sons to search for and hire a ghost writer to write the book in its entirety. According to St. John Hunt, it was he who suggested to his father the idea of a memoir to reveal what he knew about the Kennedy assassination, but the Hunt Literary Estate disputes this as scurrilous.

The foreword to American Spy was written by William F. Buckley Jr. According to Buckley, he was asked through an intermediary to write the introduction but declined after he found that the manuscript contained material "that suggested transgressions of the highest order, including a hint that LBJ might have had a hand in the plot to assassinate President Kennedy." He stated that the work "was clearly ghostwritten", and eventually agreed to write an introduction focusing on his early friendship with Hunt after he received a revised manuscript "with the loony grassy-knoll bits chiseled out".

Publishers Weekly called American Spy a "breezy, unrepentant memoir" and described it as a "nostalgic memoir [that] breaks scant new ground in an already crowded field". Tim Rutten of the Los Angeles Times said it was "a bitter and self-pitying memoir" and "offers a rather standard account of how men of his generation became involved in intelligence work".

Referencing the book's title, Tim Weiner of The New York Times wrote: "American Spy is presented as a 'secret history,' a double-barreled misrepresentation. There are no real secrets in this book. As history it is bunk." Weiner said that the author's examination of the Kennedy assassination was the low-point of the book, indicating that Hunt pretended to take various conspiracy theories, including the involvement of former President Johnson, seriously. He concluded his review describing it as a work "in a long tradition of arrant nonsense" and "a book to shun". Joseph C. Goulden of The Washington Times described it as a "true mess of a book" and dismissed Hunt's allegations against Johnson as "fantasy". Goulden summarized his review: "I wish now that I had not read this pathetic book. Avoid it."

Writing for The Christian Science Monitor, Daniel Schorr said "Hunt tells most of his Watergate venture fairly straight". Contrasting this opinion, Politico's James Rosen described the chapters regarding Watergate as the "[m]ost problematic" and wrote: "There are numerous factual errors – misspelled names, wrong dates, phantom participants in meetings, fictitious orders given – and the authors never substantively address, only pause occasionally to demean, the vast scholarly literature that has arisen in the last two decades to explain the central mystery of Watergate."

Rosen's review was not entirely negative and he indicated that the book "succeeds in taking readers beyond the caricatures and conspiracy theories to preserve the valuable memory of Hunt as he really was: passionate patriot; committed Cold Warrior; a lover of fine food, wine and women; incurable intriguer, wicked wit and superb storyteller." Dennis Lythgoe of Deseret News said "[t]he writing style is awkward and often embarrassing", but that "the book as a whole is a fascinating look into the mind of one of the major Watergate figures". In National Review, Mark Riebling praised American Spy as "the only autobiography I know of that convincingly conveys what it was like to be an American spy."

The Boston Globe writer Martin Nolan called it "admirable and important" and said that Hunt "presents a livelier, tabloid version of the 1970s". According to Nolan: "It is the best moment-by-moment depiction of the June 17, 1972, burglary of Democratic National Committee headquarters I have ever read."

=== Interviews ===
Canadian journalist David Giammarco interviewed Hunt for the December 2000 issue of Cigar Aficionado magazine. Hunt later wrote the foreword to Giammarco's book For Your Eyes Only: Behind the Scenes of the James Bond Films (ECW Press, 2002).

== Personal life ==
=== Marriage to Dorothy Wetzel ===
Hunt's first wife, Dorothy Louise (née Wetzel) Day Goutiere, was born on April 1, 1920, in Dayton, Ohio. Wetzel was a CIA employee in Shanghai, and later served as secretary to W. Averell Harriman in Paris during the Marshall Plan. Hunt and Wetzel had four children, including two daughters, Lisa and Kevan, and two sons, Howard St. John and David.

Dorothy Hunt was killed in the December 8, 1972, crash of United Airlines Flight 553 in Chicago. Congress, the FBI and the National Transportation Safety Board (NTSB) investigated the crash, and concluded that the crash was caused by accidental crew error.

Some sources have suggested and stated that "much more than" $10,000 in cash was found in Dorothy Hunt's handbag in the wreckage.

=== Marriage to Laura Martin ===
Hunt later married teacher Laura Martin, with whom he raised two more children, Austin and Hollis. Following his release from prison, he and Laura moved to Guadalajara, Mexico, where they lived for five years before returning to the United States, where they settled in Miami.

== In media ==
Hunt's involvement in Watergate was featured in the acclaimed 1976 film All the President's Men. Hunt was portrayed by Ed Harris in the 1995 biopic Nixon. In the 2019 film The Irishman, Hunt is portrayed by stage actor Daniel Jenkins. In the 2022 series Gaslit, Hunt is portrayed by J. C. MacKenzie. In the 2023 HBO miniseries White House Plumbers, Hunt is played by Woody Harrelson.

Hunt was interviewed for the 1988 Jack Anderson documentary American Expose: Who Killed JFK?. A fictionalized account of Hunt's role in the Bay of Pigs operation appears in Norman Mailer's 1991 novel Harlot's Ghost.

On the television series The X-Files, the antagonist known as Cigarette Smoking Man (portrayed by William B. Davis) was a shadowy intelligence operative partly modeled on Hunt. The episode "Musings of a Cigarette Smoking Man", fleshed out the character's backstory as unsuccessful author of mystery/suspense fiction in his spare time. When meeting Lee Harvey Oswald, prior to the JFK assassination, he goes by the alias 'Mr. Hunt.'

== Death ==
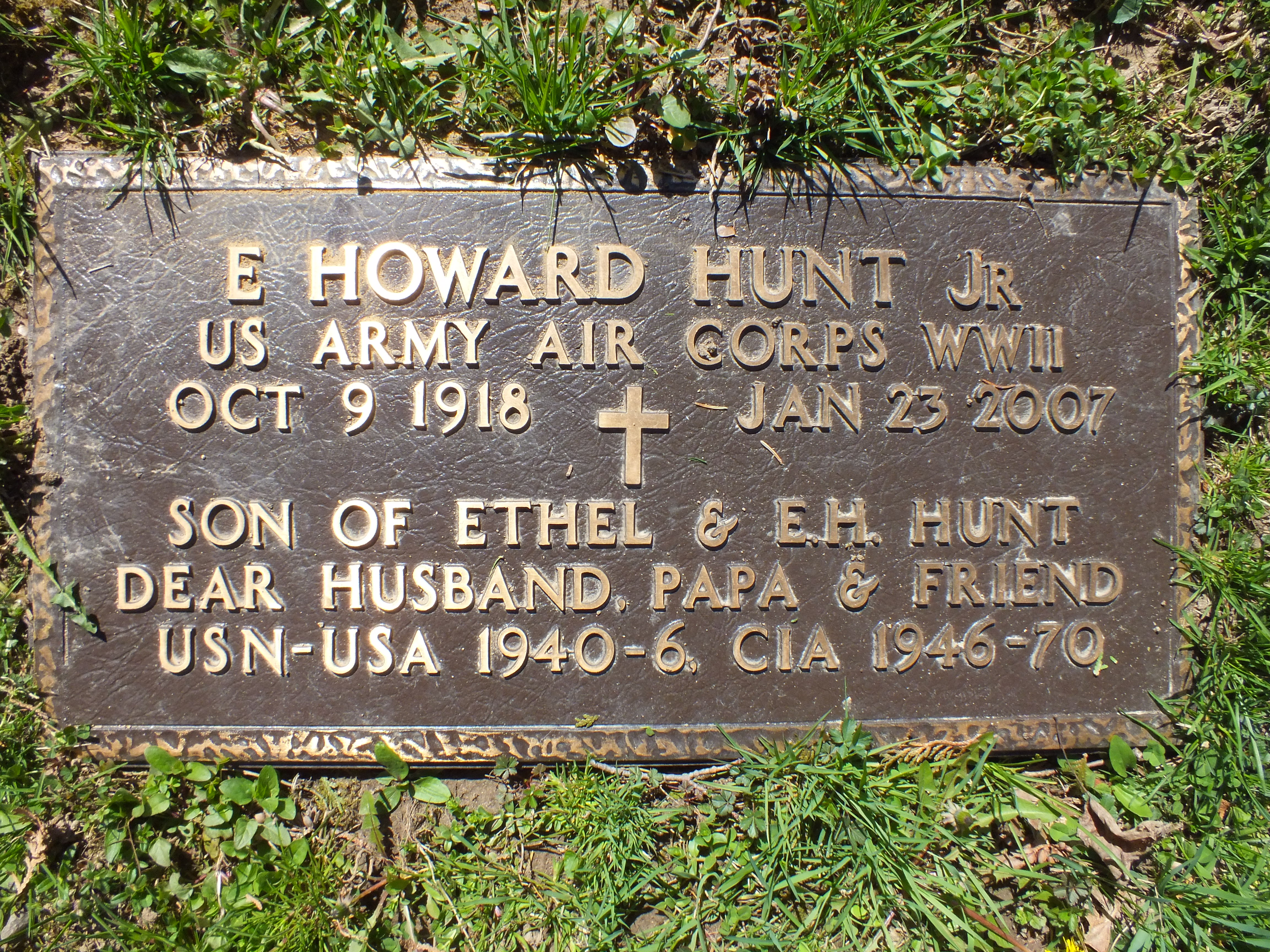
Hunt's grave marker in Hamburg, New York

On January 23, 2007, Hunt died of pneumonia in Miami, at age 88. He is buried in Prospect Lawn Cemetery in his hometown of Hamburg, New York.

== Books ==
=== Nonfiction ===
- Give Us This Day: The Inside Story of the CIA and the Bay of Pigs Invasion, by One of Its Key Organizers. New Rochelle: Arlington House (1973)
- Undercover: Memoirs of an American Secret Agent (1974). New York: Berkeley Publishing Corporation
- American Spy: My Secret History in the CIA, Watergate, and Beyond (2007), with Greg Aunapu. Foreword by William F. Buckley, Jr. Hoboken, N.J.: John Wiley & Sons

=== Book contributions ===
- Foreword to For Your Eyes Only: Behind the Scenes of the James Bond Films, by David Giammarco (2002)

=== Novels as Howard Hunt or E. Howard Hunt ===
- East of Farewell (1942)
- Limit of Darkness (1944)
- Stranger in Town (1947)
- Calculated Risk: A Play / Howard Hunt (1948)
- Maelstrom / Howard Hunt. (1948)
- Bimini Run (1949)
- The Violent Ones (1950)
- The Berlin Ending: A Novel of Discovery (1973)
- Hargrave Deception / E. Howard Hunt (1980)
- Gaza Intercept / E. Howard Hunt (1981)
- Cozumel / E. Howard Hunt (1985)
- Kremlin Conspiracy / E. Howard Hunt (1985)
- Guadalajara / E. Howard Hunt (1990)
- Murder in State / E. Howard Hunt (1990)
- Body Count / E. Howard Hunt (1992)
- Chinese Red / E. Howard Hunt (1992)
- Mazatlán / E. Howard Hunt (1993) (lists former pseudonym P. S. Donoghue on cover)
- Ixtapa / E. Howard Hunt (1994)
- Islamorada / E. Howard Hunt (1995)
- Paris Edge / E. Howard Hunt (1995)
- Izmir / E. Howard Hunt (1996)
- Dragon Teeth: A Novel / E. Howard Hunt (1997)
- Guilty Knowledge / E. Howard Hunt (1999)
- Sonora / E. Howard Hunt (2000)

=== As Robert Dietrich ===
- Cheat (1954)
- One for the Road (1954)
- Be My Victim (1956)
- Murder on the rocks: an original novel (1957)
- House on Q Street (1959)
- Murder on Her Mind (1960)
- End of a Stripper (1960)
- Mistress to Murder (1960)
- Calypso Caper (1961)
- Angel Eyes (1961)
- Curtains for a Lover (1962)
- My Body (1962)

=== As P. S. Donoghue ===
- Dublin Affair (1988)
- Sarkov Confession: a novel (1989)
- Evil Time (1992)

=== As David St. John ===
- Festival for Spies
- The Towers of Silence
- Return from Vorkuta (1965)
- The Venus Probe (1966)
- On Hazardous Duty (1966)
- One of Our Agents is Missing (1967)
- Mongol Mask (1968)
- Sorcerers (1969)
- Diabolus (1971)
- Coven (1972)

=== As Gordon Davis ===
- I Came to Kill (1953)
- House Dick (1961)
- Counterfeit Kill (1963)
- Ring Around Rosy (1964)
- Where Murder Waits (1965)

=== As John Baxter ===
- A Foreign Affair. New York: Avon (1954)
- Unfaithful. New York: Avon (1955)

== See also ==
- G. Gordon Liddy
- James W. McCord
- All the President's Men by Carl Bernstein and Bob Woodward
