= James W. McCord Jr. =

American CIA officer (1924–2017)

James McCord
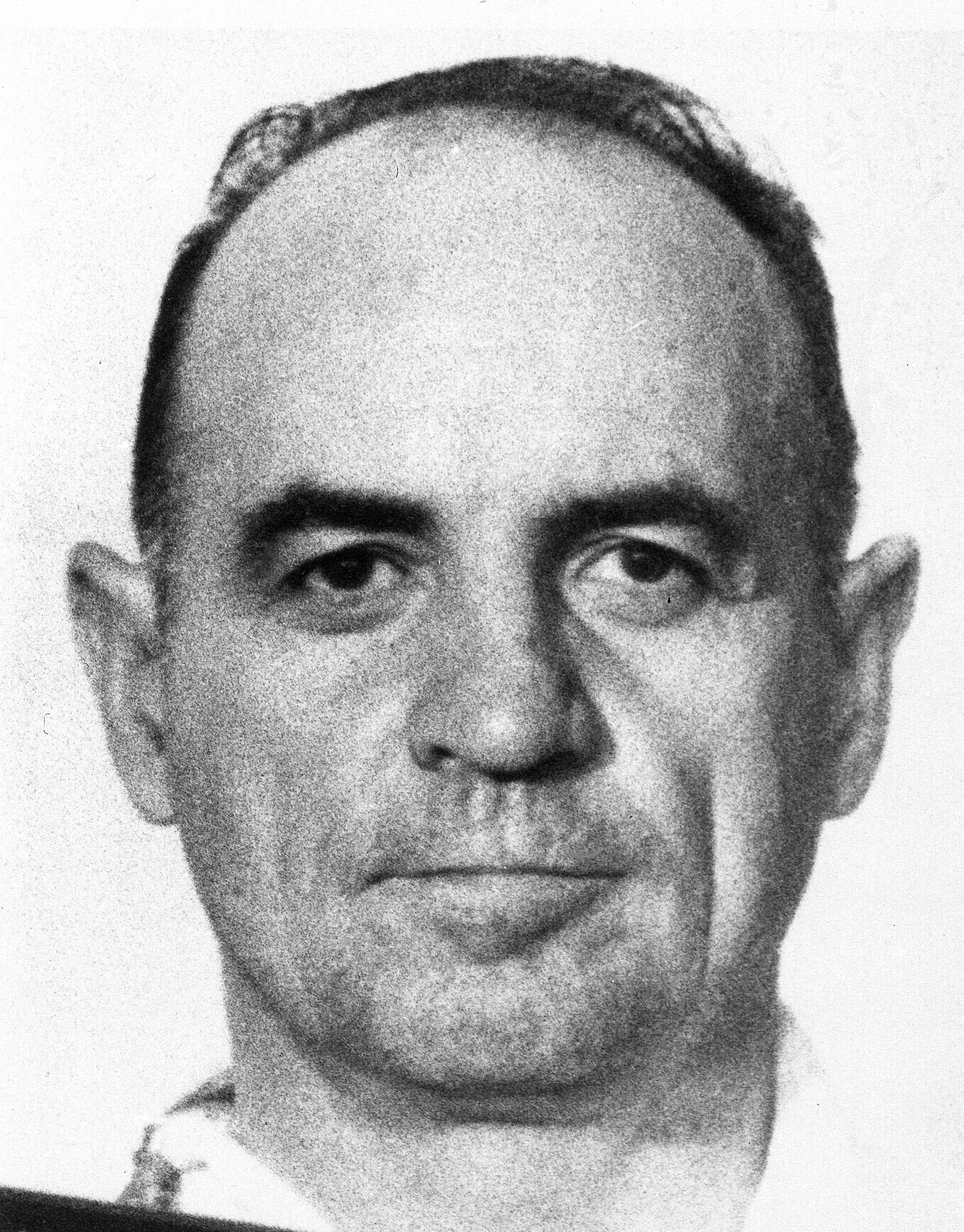
- McCord's mugshot after his arrest, 1972
- Born: James Walter McCord Jr. January 26, 1924; Waurika, Oklahoma, U.S.
- Died: June 15, 2017 (aged 93); Douglassville, Pennsylvania, U.S.
- Other name: Ed Martin
- Education: University of Texas, Austin (BBA); George Washington University (MS)
- Occupations: CIA officer and electronics expert
- Known for: Participation in the Watergate Scandal
- Military career
- Allegiance: United States
- Branch: United States Air Force (1949–1972)
- Rank: Lieutenant Colonel
- Units: United States Air Force Reserve

James Walter McCord Jr. (January 26, 1924 – June 15, 2017) was an American CIA officer, later head of security for President Richard Nixon's 1972 reelection campaign. He was involved as an electronics expert in the burglaries which precipitated the Watergate scandal.

== Career ==
McCord was born in Waurika, Oklahoma. He served as a bombardier with the rank of second lieutenant in the Army Air Forces during World War II. He briefly attended Baylor University before receiving a B.B.A. from the University of Texas at Austin in 1949. In 1965, he received an M.S. in international affairs from George Washington University. After beginning his career at the Federal Bureau of Investigation (FBI), McCord worked for the Central Intelligence Agency (CIA) from August 1951 until a round of layoffs in August 1970, ultimately ascending to a GS-15 role as chief of the Physical Security Division in the Agency's Office of Security in October 1968. As part of his purview, McCord oversaw security operations at the Agency's Langley headquarters.

L. Fletcher Prouty, a former colonel in the United States Air Force, claimed then-Director of Central Intelligence Allen Dulles introduced McCord to him as "my top man."

While he was ensconced as deputy chief of the Office of Security's Security Research Staff (characterized by Jim Hougan as a "tabernacle within the inner sanctum" of the Agency due to the Office reporting directly [by virtue of its counterintelligence-oriented remit] to the Director of Central Intelligence and the Staff's ensuing outsized roles in the MKUltra and Operation CHAOS programs, among others) under then-chief Paul F. Gaynor from 1957 to 1962, a McCord-directed counterintelligence program was launched against the Fair Play for Cuba Committee in 1961, although he was assigned to Frankfurt, West Germany as chief of the Office's Regional Security Support Staff for Europe (1962–64) amid the November 22, 1963 assassination of John F. Kennedy. He also held the rank of lieutenant colonel in the United States Air Force Reserve; in this capacity, he attended the Air War College during the 1964–65 academic year. According to J. Anthony Lukas, he was likely involved in some capacity in the CIA's organization of the 1961 Bay of Pigs invasion in Cuba.

Upon his retirement from the CIA, he was awarded the Distinguished Service Award.

John M. Newman says in his 2022 book, Uncovering Popov's Mole, that Bruce Solie and McCord were probably KGB "moles" in the CIA's Office of Security, and that McCord very likely protected Solie and another "mole," Pyotr Semyonovich Popov's honey-trapped and recruited-by-KGB dead drop arranger, Edward Ellis Smith, from being uncovered by U.S. Intelligence.

His neighbor once noted, "He often seemed as though he had some very important secret on his mind."

== Watergate scandal ==
Shortly after resigning from the CIA, McCord was interviewed and then hired by Jack Caulfield in January 1972 "for strict, solely defensive security work at the Republican National Committee (RNC) and the Committee to Re-Elect the President (CRP)." McCord and four other accomplices were arrested during the second break-in to the Democratic National Committee's headquarters at the Watergate complex on June 17, 1972. The arrests led to the Watergate scandal and Nixon's resignation.

McCord asserted that the White House knew of and approved the break ins, and proceeded to cover up the incident. Because of McCord's statements, the Watergate investigators pursued many more leads.

McCord was one of the first men convicted in the Watergate criminal trial; on eight counts of conspiracy, burglary and wiretapping. On March 21, 1973, three days before sentencing, McCord, after speaking to a probation officer and thus surmising that he might be facing a lengthy prison sentence, submitted a letter to the judge in the case, John Sirica, in which he claimed that he and the other defendants had committed perjury in their trial and that there was pressure from higher up for them to have done so. On March 23, the day of the sentencing, Sirica sentenced the other defendants provisionally, citing a statute that allowed for maximum sentences of several decades as a means to "research" more information needed for the final sentencing. This was a means to pressure the defendants into revealing more information about the burglary. McCord's sentencing was postponed until June and then postponed again. Finally, in November 1973, McCord was sentenced to one to five years and began serving his sentence in March 1975, but was released after only four months because of his cooperation in the Watergate investigation.

== Post-Watergate ==
After serving four months in prison, McCord continued with McCord Associates, which was his own security firm located in Rockville, retiring later to Pennsylvania.

McCord died at the age of 93 from pancreatic cancer on June 15, 2017, at his home in Douglassville, Pennsylvania. His death was not reported in local or national news outlets until 2019.

== Personal life ==
McCord was married for decades to Sarah Ruth McCord (née Berry) (1927-2014); they had three children: Michael, Carol Anne, and Nancy.

== In popular culture ==
McCord was portrayed in All the President's Men, the 1976 film retelling the events of the Watergate scandal, by Richard Herd.

McCord was portrayed in Gaslit, the 2022 television adaptation of the podcast Slow Burn by Chris Bauer. In the TV-series White House Plumbers he was portrayed by Toby Huss.

== See also ==
- G. Gordon Liddy
- E. Howard Hunt
- All the President's Men by Carl Bernstein and Bob Woodward
- Tennent H. Bagley
