= All the President's Men =

1974 book by Carl Bernstein and Bob Woodward

- The cover of the 1974 first edition
- Author: Carl Bernstein and Bob Woodward
- Language: English
- Genre: True crime
- Publisher: Simon & Schuster
- Publication date: June 15, 1974
- Publication place: United States
- Media type: Hardback
- Pages: 349
- ISBN: 978-0-671-21781-5 (first edition)
- OCLC: 892340
- Dewey Decimal: 364.1/32/0973
- LC Class: E860 .B47
- Followed by: The Final Days

All the President's Men is a 1974 non-fiction book by Carl Bernstein and Bob Woodward, two Washington Post journalists who investigated the June 1972 break-in at the Watergate Office Building and the resultant political scandal. The book chronicles the investigative reporting of Woodward and Bernstein from Woodward's initial report on the Watergate break-in through the resignations of Nixon Administration officials H. R. Haldeman and John Ehrlichman in April 1973, and the revelation of the Oval Office Watergate tapes by Alexander Butterfield three months later. It relates the events behind the major stories the duo wrote for the Post, naming some sources who had previously refused to be identified for their initial articles, notably Hugh Sloan. It also gives detailed accounts of Woodward's secret meetings with his source Deep Throat, whose identity was kept hidden for over 30 years. Gene Roberts, the former executive editor of The Philadelphia Inquirer and former managing editor of The New York Times, has called the work of Woodward and Bernstein "maybe the single greatest reporting effort of all time."

A film adaptation, starring Robert Redford and Dustin Hoffman as Woodward and Bernstein, respectively, was released in 1976. The same year, a sequel to the book, The Final Days, was published, which chronicled the last months of Richard Nixon's presidency, starting around the time their previous book ended.

== Background ==
Woodward and Bernstein had considered the idea of writing a book about Watergate, but did not commit until actor Robert Redford expressed interest in purchasing the film rights. In Telling the Truth About Lies: The Making of "All the President's Men", Woodward noted that Redford played an important role in changing the book's narrative from a story about the Watergate events to one about their investigations and reportage of the story and was thus successful in transferring the content from one medium and one genre to another (see: media adequacy).

The name of the book alludes to the nursery rhyme about Humpty Dumpty ("All the king's horses and all the king's men / Couldn't put Humpty together again"). An allusion similar to that was made more explicitly a quarter-century earlier in Robert Penn Warren's 1946 novel All the King's Men, which describes the career of a fictional corrupt governor, loosely based on Huey Long.

== Important individuals ==
=== The President ===
- Richard Nixon

=== The President's men ===
They are listed with their 1972 positions in either the president's executive staff or in his re-election committee, where applicable.

==== White House ====
- Alexander Butterfield, Deputy Assistant to the President
- Dwight Chapin, Deputy Assistant to the President
- Ken W. Clawson, Deputy Director of Communications for the President
- Charles Colson, Special Counsel to the President
- John Dean, White House Counsel
- John Ehrlichman, Counsel and Assistant to the President for Domestic Affairs
- H. R. Haldeman, White House Chief of Staff
- E. Howard Hunt Jr., President's Special Investigations Unit ("White House Plumbers")
- Henry Kissinger, National Security Advisor
- Egil Krogh, head of the President's Special Investigations Unit ("White House Plumbers")
- Gerald Warren, White House Press Secretary, succeeding Ziegler
- David R. Young, special assistant at the National Security Council
- Ron Ziegler, White House Press Secretary

==== Committee to Re-elect the President (CRP) ====
- Kenneth H. Dahlberg, CRP's Midwest finance chairman
- Herbert W. Kalmbach, personal attorney to President Richard Nixon and Deputy Finance Chairman of CRP
- G. Gordon Liddy, CRP employee
- Clark MacGregor, CRP Chairman
- Jeb Stuart Magruder, Deputy Director, and assistant to the Director of CRP
- Robert Mardian, CRP political coordinator
- John N. Mitchell, Attorney General, and CRP campaign director
- Robert Odle, Director of Administration ("office manager") for CRP
- Kenneth Parkinson, CRP counsel
- Herbert Porter, CRP organizer and former White House aide
- Donald Segretti, political operative for CRP
- Hugh W. Sloan Jr., CRP treasurer
- Judy Hoback Miller, CRP bookkeeper
- Maurice Stans, CRP finance chairman
- Gordon C. Strachan, staff assistant to Herbert G. Klein but was assigned to be H. R. Haldeman's liaison to CRP

==== Rest of the President's men ====
- Alfred C. Baldwin III
- Jack Caulfield
- L. Patrick Gray, acting Director of the Federal Bureau of Investigation
- Richard Kleindienst, Attorney General (succeeding John Mitchell)
- Fred LaRue, no rank, title, salary, or even listing in the White House directory
- Powell A. Moore
- Kenneth Rietz
- DeVan L. Shumway

=== The burglars ===
- Bernard L. Barker
- Virgilio R. Gonzalez
- Eugenio R. Martinez
- James W. McCord, Jr.
- Frank A. Sturgis

=== The prosecutors ===
- Henry E. Petersen, United States Assistant Attorney General
- Earl J. Silbert, United States Attorney for the District of Columbia
- Donald E. Campbell, Assistant U.S. Attorney
- Seymour Glanzer, Assistant United States Attorney for the District of Columbia

=== The judge ===
- John J. Sirica, District Judge for the United States District Court for the District of Columbia

=== The Washington Post ===
- Carl Bernstein, Reporter
- Bob Woodward, Reporter
- Benjamin C. Bradlee, Executive Editor
- Katharine Graham, Publisher
- Harry M. Rosenfeld, Metropolitan Editor
- Howard Simons, Managing Editor
- Barry Sussman, City Desk Editor
- Brett Gurganious, Local News Reporter

=== The senator ===
- Sam Ervin (D–NC), chair of the Senate Watergate Committee

=== The informant ===
- Deep Throat (revealed in 2005 to be Mark Felt)

== Publication ==
Dick Snyder of Simon & Schuster purchased the right to publish the book through the agent David Obst. The authors received an advance of $55,000. In his memoir, Michael Korda said of the book's publication that it "transformed book publishing into a red-hot part of media" and books became "news" instead of history.

Because the book was embargoed until publication day, there were no advance copies for reviewers. Simon & Schuster became known as the "Watergate" publisher by following up All the President's Men with books by John Dean, Maureen Dean, John Ehrlichman and John Mitchell.

== See also ==
- All the Prime Minister's Men, 2021 documentary
- The Final Days, 1976 book
