= Timeline of the Watergate scandal =

Key events in 1970s Nixon administration Watergate scandal

The Watergate scandal refers to the burglary and illegal wiretapping of the headquarters of the Democratic National Committee, in the Watergate complex by members of President Richard Nixon's re-election campaign, and the subsequent cover-up of the break-in resulting in Nixon's resignation on August 9, 1974, as well as other abuses of power by the Nixon White House that were discovered during the course of the scandal.

== 1960s ==
- November 5, 1968: Richard Nixon elected President.
- January 20, 1969: Richard Nixon is inaugurated as the 37th President of the United States.

== 1970s ==
- July 1, 1971: David Young and Egil "Bud" Krogh write a memo suggesting the formation of what later became the "White House Plumbers" in response to the leak of the Pentagon Papers by Daniel Ellsberg, after The New York Times began publishing excerpts on June 13, 1971.
- August 21, 1971: Nixon's Enemies List is started by White House aides (though Nixon himself may not have been aware of it); to "use the available federal machinery to screw our political enemies."
- September 3, 1971: "White House Plumbers" E. Howard Hunt, G. Gordon Liddy, and others break into the offices of Daniel Ellsberg's psychiatrist Lewis Fielding looking for material that might discredit Ellsberg, under the direction of John Ehrlichman or his staff within the White House. This was the Plumbers' first major operation.
- By early 1972, the Plumbers, at this stage assigned to the Committee to Re-Elect the President (abbreviated CRP, but often mocked by the acronym CREEP), had become frustrated at the lack of additional assignments they were being asked to perform, and that any plans and proposals they suggested were being rejected by CRP. Liddy and Hunt took their complaints to the White House – most likely to Charles Colson – and requested that the White House start putting pressure on CRP to assign them new operations. It is likely that both Colson and White House Chief of Staff H. R. Haldeman did so, starting the chain of events that led to the Watergate break-ins a few months later. This narrative was confirmed in the famous "Cancer on the Presidency" conversation between Nixon and White House Counsel John Dean on March 21, 1973.
- May 2, 1972: J. Edgar Hoover dies; L. Patrick Gray is appointed acting FBI director. Associate Director Mark Felt (Deep Throat) is passed over.
- May 28, 1972: Liddy's team breaks into DNC Headquarters at the Watergate complex for the first time, bugging the telephones of staffers.
- June 17, 1972: The plumbers are arrested at 2:30 a.m. in the process of burgling and planting surveillance bugs in the Democratic National Committee offices at the Watergate Building Complex.
- June 19, 1972: Despite efforts by Steve King, Martha Mitchell acquires a copy of the Los Angeles Times, and recognizes the name of one of the Watergate burglars, James W. McCord Jr., security director of the CRP.
- June 20, 1972: Reportedly based on a tip from Deep Throat (associate director of the FBI Mark Felt), Bob Woodward reports in The Washington Post that one of the burglars had E. Howard Hunt in his address book and possessed checks signed by Hunt, and that Hunt was connected to Charles Colson. On the same day, Nixon and Haldeman have a conversation that is recorded by the White House taping system. Eighteen and a half minutes of this conversation will later be erased.
- June 23, 1972: In the Oval Office, H. R. Haldeman recommends to President Nixon that they shut down the FBI investigation of the Watergate break-in, by having CIA Director Richard Helms and Deputy Director Vernon A. Walters tell acting FBI Director L. Patrick Gray to, "Stay the hell out of this". Haldeman expects Gray will then seek and take advice from Deputy FBI Director Mark Felt, and Felt will obey direction from the White House out of ambition. Nixon agrees and gives the order. The conversation is recorded.
- September 15, 1972: Hunt, Liddy, and the Watergate burglars are indicted by a federal grand jury.
- November 7, 1972: Nixon re-elected, defeating George McGovern with the largest plurality of votes in American history.
- January 8, 1973: Five defendants plead guilty as the burglary trial begins. Liddy and James W. McCord Jr. are convicted in the trial.
- January 20, 1973: Nixon is inaugurated for his second term.
- February 28, 1973: Confirmation hearings begin for L. Patrick Gray as permanent Director of the FBI. During these hearings, Gray reveals that he had complied with an order from John Dean to provide daily updates on the Watergate investigation, and also that Dean had "probably lied" to FBI investigators.
- March 17, 1973: Watergate burglar McCord writes a letter to Judge John Sirica, asserting that some of his testimony was perjured under pressure and that the burglary was not a CIA operation, but had involved other government officials, thereby leading the investigation to the White House.
- March 21, 1973: Dean tells Nixon there is a "cancer" on the presidency.
- March 23, 1973: The McCord letter is made public by Judge Sirica in open court at McCord's sentencing hearing.
- April 6, 1973: White House counsel John Dean begins cooperating with federal Watergate prosecutors.
- April 27, 1973: L. Patrick Gray resigns after it comes to light that he destroyed files from E. Howard Hunt's safe. William Ruckelshaus is appointed as his replacement.
- April 30, 1973: Senior White House administration officials Ehrlichman, Haldeman, and Richard Kleindienst resign, and John Dean is fired.
- May 17, 1973: The Senate Watergate Committee begins its nationally televised hearings.
- May 19, 1973: Independent special prosecutor Archibald Cox appointed to oversee investigation into possible presidential impropriety.
- June 3, 1973: John Dean tells Watergate investigators that he has discussed the cover-up with Nixon at least 35 times, a claim which was proven to be false in a call between President Nixon and Ronald Ziegler and with Charles Colson
- July 13, 1973: Alexander Butterfield, former presidential appointments secretary, reveals that all conversations and telephone calls in Nixon's office have been taped since 1971.
- July 18, 1973: Nixon orders White House taping systems disconnected.
- July 23, 1973: Nixon refuses to turn over presidential tapes to the Senate Watergate Committee or the special prosecutor.
- Vice President replaced:
  - October 10, 1973: Spiro Agnew resigns as Vice President of the United States due to corruption while he was the governor of Maryland.
  - October 12, 1973: Gerald Ford is nominated as vice president under the Twenty-fifth Amendment to the United States Constitution.
- October 20, 1973: "Saturday Night Massacre" – Nixon orders Elliot Richardson and Ruckelshaus to fire special prosecutor Cox. Each of them refuses to comply, and resigns. Robert Bork considers resignation, but carries out the order.
- November 1, 1973: Leon Jaworski is appointed new special prosecutor.
- November 17, 1973: Nixon delivers "I am not a crook" speech at a televised press conference at Disney World in Orlando, Florida.
  - November 27, 1973: the Senate votes 92 to 3 to confirm Ford as vice president.
  - December 6, 1973: the House votes 387 to 35 to confirm Ford as vice president, and he takes the oath of office an hour after the vote.
- January 28, 1974: Nixon campaign aide Herbert Porter pleads guilty to perjury.
- February 25, 1974: Nixon personal counsel Herbert Kalmbach pleads guilty to two charges of illegal campaign activities.
- March 1, 1974: In an indictment against seven former presidential aides, delivered to Judge Sirica together with a sealed briefcase intended for the House Committee on the Judiciary, Nixon is named as an unindicted co-conspirator.
- March 4, 1974: The "Watergate Seven" (Mitchell, Haldeman, Ehrlichman, Colson, Gordon C. Strachan, Robert Mardian, and Kenneth Parkinson) are formally indicted.
- March 18, 1974: Judge Sirica orders the grand jury's sealed report to be sent to the House Committee on the Judiciary.
- April 5, 1974: Dwight Chapin convicted of lying to a grand jury.
- April 7, 1974: Ed Reinecke, Republican lieutenant governor of California, indicted on three charges of perjury before the Senate committee.
- April 16, 1974: Special Prosecutor Jaworski issues a subpoena for 64 White House tapes.
- April 30, 1974: White House releases edited transcripts of the Nixon tapes, but the House Judiciary Committee insists the actual tapes must be turned over.
- May 9, 1974: Impeachment hearings begin before the House Judiciary Committee.
- June 15, 1974: Woodward and Bernstein's book All the President's Men is published by Simon & Schuster (ISBN 0-671-21781-X).
- July 8, 1974: The United States Supreme Court hears oral argument in United States v. Nixon.
- July 24, 1974: United States v. Nixon decided: in a unanimous decision, the Supreme Court orders Nixon to release his Oval Office tapes to investigators.
- Congress moves to impeach Nixon.
  - July 27 to July 30, 1974: House Judiciary Committee passes Articles of Impeachment.
  - Early August 1974: A previously unknown tape from June 23, 1972 (recorded a few days after the break-in) documenting Nixon and Haldeman formulating a plan to block investigations is released. This recording later became known as the "Smoking Gun".
  - The House Republicans who opposed impeachment in committee now say they will vote to impeach Nixon on the House floor.
- August 7, 1974: Key congressional Republicans Sen. Barry Goldwater, House Republican Leader John Jacob Rhodes and Senate Republican Leader Hugh Scott tell Nixon that there are enough votes to impeach him in the House and convict him in the Senate. That evening, Nixon finalizes decision to resign.
- August 8, 1974: Nixon delivers his resignation speech before a nationally televised audience.
- August 9, 1974: Nixon resigns from office and Ford becomes president.
- September 8, 1974: President Ford ends the investigations by granting Nixon a pardon.
- October 17, 1974: Ford testifies before Congress on the pardon, the first sitting president to testify before Congress since President Lincoln.
- November 7, 1974: 94th Congress elected: Democratic Party picks up 5 Senate seats and 49 House seats. Many of the freshman congressmen are very young; the media dubs them "Watergate Babies".
- December 31, 1974: As a result of Nixon administration abuses of privacy, Privacy Act of 1974 passes into law.
- January 1, 1975: John N. Mitchell, John Ehrlichman and H. R. Haldeman convicted of conspiracy, obstruction of justice and perjury.
- July 27, 1975: Church Committee, chaired by Frank Church, commences investigation of foreign and domestic intelligence-gathering activities.
- November 4, 1975: Ford replaces several Nixon cabinet members in the "Halloween Massacre", engineered by Ford aide Donald Rumsfeld. Richard Cheney, George H. W. Bush and Brent Scowcroft join the Ford administration; Rumsfeld becomes Secretary of Defense; Henry Kissinger remains as Secretary of State but not National Security Advisor.
- May 5, 1976: Church Committee superseded by Senate Select Committee on Intelligence.
- November 2, 1976: Ford is defeated in the United States presidential election by Jimmy Carter.
- January 20, 1977: Jimmy Carter is inaugurated as the 39th President of The United States.
- May 4, 1977: Nixon gives his first major interview about Watergate with British TV journalist David Frost.
- May 15, 1978: Nixon publishes RN: the Memoirs of Richard Nixon, giving more of his side of the Watergate saga.
- October 25, 1978: Foreign Intelligence Surveillance Act enacted, creating Foreign Intelligence Surveillance Court and limiting federal government domestic surveillance powers. Recommended by Church Committee.

== 1990s ==
- May 1990: Publication of Wars of Watergate by Stanley Kutler, often cited as the definitive history of the Watergate Scandal.
- January 1992: Publication of Silent Coup by journalists Len Colodny and Robert Gettlin, blaming Watergate burglary on John Dean who wanted to cover up involvement of his fiancée with a call-girl ring. The book was endorsed by Liddy, in his first major statement about the Watergate case; this prompted Dean to sue Liddy, Colodny and Gettlin for defamation. Dean's case was dismissed and settled out of court; DNC secretary Ida "Maxine" Wells, also implicated by Liddy in call-girl cover-up, sued for defamation but jury in that case deadlocked and the judge dismissed the case in 2001. The book, often dismissed as a revisionist, pro-Nixon apology or conspiracy theory, was also endorsed by Roger Stone.
- April 22, 1994: Richard Nixon dies aged 81, after suffering a stroke. In keeping with his own wishes, he was not given a state funeral, though his funeral service five days later was a high-profile affair, attended by all five living U.S. Presidents and a host of other VIPs.

== 2000s ==
- May 31, 2005: W. Mark Felt, former Associate Director of the FBI during the Watergate years, declares that he is Deep Throat. This declaration was later confirmed by reporters Bob Woodward and Carl Bernstein, although it was disputed by some writers.
