= Canuck letter =

1972 political sabotage case

The letter

The Canuck letter was a letter to the editor of the Manchester Union Leader, published February 24, 1972, two weeks before the New Hampshire primary of the 1972 United States presidential election. It implied that Senator Edmund Muskie, a candidate for the Democratic Party's presidential nomination, held prejudice against "Canucks", Americans of French-Canadian descent.

The letter's immediate effect was to compel the candidate to give a speech in front of the newspaper's offices, subsequently known as "the crying speech". (Note: The first reference to Muskie's address as the "crying speech" appears to date to October 1972 in an article by Carl Bernstein and Bob Woodward.) The letter's indirect effect was to contribute to the demise of Muskie's candidacy.

In October 1972, Federal Bureau of Investigation (FBI) investigators asserted that the Canuck letter was part of the dirty tricks campaign against Democrats orchestrated by the Committee for the Re-Election of the President. The letter was a successful attempt at sabotage, reportedly masterminded by Donald Segretti and written by Ken W. Clawson. Authorship of the letter is covered at length in the 1974 book All the President's Men by Bob Woodward and Carl Bernstein and its 1976 film adaptation.

== Background ==
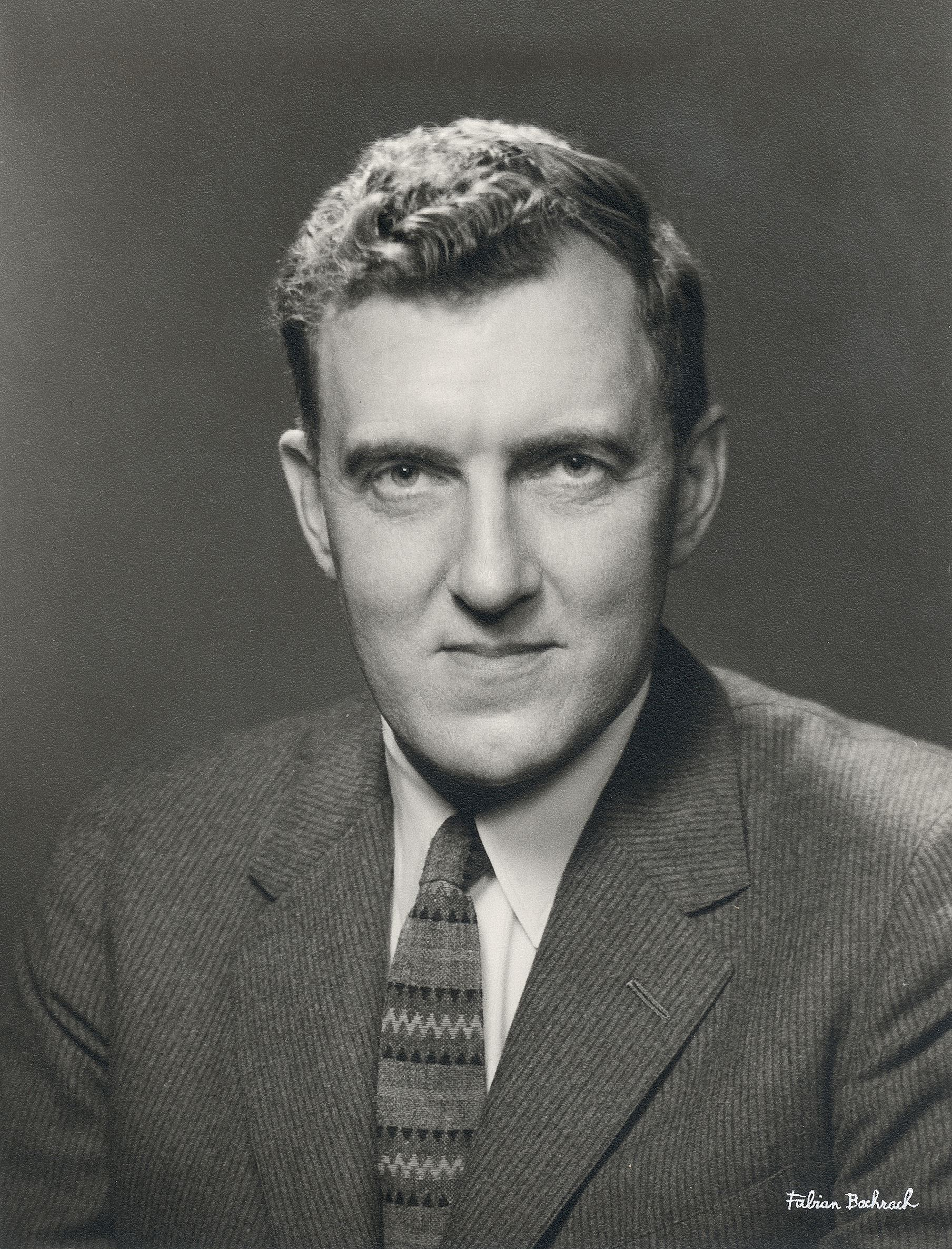
Muskie during his time as Governor of Maine

At the time, Edmund Muskie, aged 57, was a sitting United States Senator representing Maine, having been in office since January 1959. He had previously served four years as the governor of Maine. For the 1968 United States presidential election, Muskie had been the vice presidential selection of Democratic candidate Hubert Humphrey. President Richard Nixon and Vice President Spiro Agnew defeated Humphrey and Muskie in the election, the two ticket's electoral college totals being 301 and 191, respectively. Muskie was a candidate in the 1972 Democratic Party presidential primaries, seeking his party's nomination for president in the 1972 presidential election. He had accumulated the most delegates in the Democratic caucuses held through late February.

William Loeb III, aged 66, was publisher of the Manchester Union Leader, a conservative newspaper based in Manchester, New Hampshire. Loeb had previously been critical of Muskie—after the senator visited Moscow in January 1971, Loeb labeled him "Moscow Muskie" in a front-page editorial that also deemed him "a very dangerous man".

== Letter to the editor ==
On Thursday, February 24, the Union Leader published a letter to the editor about Muskie. It was accompanied by a front-page editorial by Loeb, headlined "Sen. Muskie Insults Franco-Americans", which concluded with (in all capital letters), "We have always known that Senator Muskie was a hypocrite, but we never expected to have it so clearly revealed as in this letter sent to us from Florida." The letter itself appeared in the paper on the editorial page in its entirety.

In a childish scrawl with poor spelling, the author of the letter claimed to have been present during a visit by Muskie and his staff to a drug rehabilitation center known as Seed House in Fort Lauderdale, Florida. Someone asked Muskie how he could understand the problems of African Americans when his home state of Maine had such a small black population. A member of Muskie's staff was said to have responded that the state did not have black people, but it did have "Canucks" (which the letter misspelled), and Muskie was said to have laughed at the remark. In part, the letter read:

He didn't have any in Maine a man with the Senator said. No blacks, but we have Cannocks [sic]. What did he mean? We asked —Mr. Muskie laughed and said come to New England and see.

While an affectionate term among Canadians today, "Canuck" is a term often considered derogatory when applied to Americans of French-Canadian ancestry in New England; a significant number of New Hampshire voters were of such ancestry.

== Editorial about Jane Muskie ==
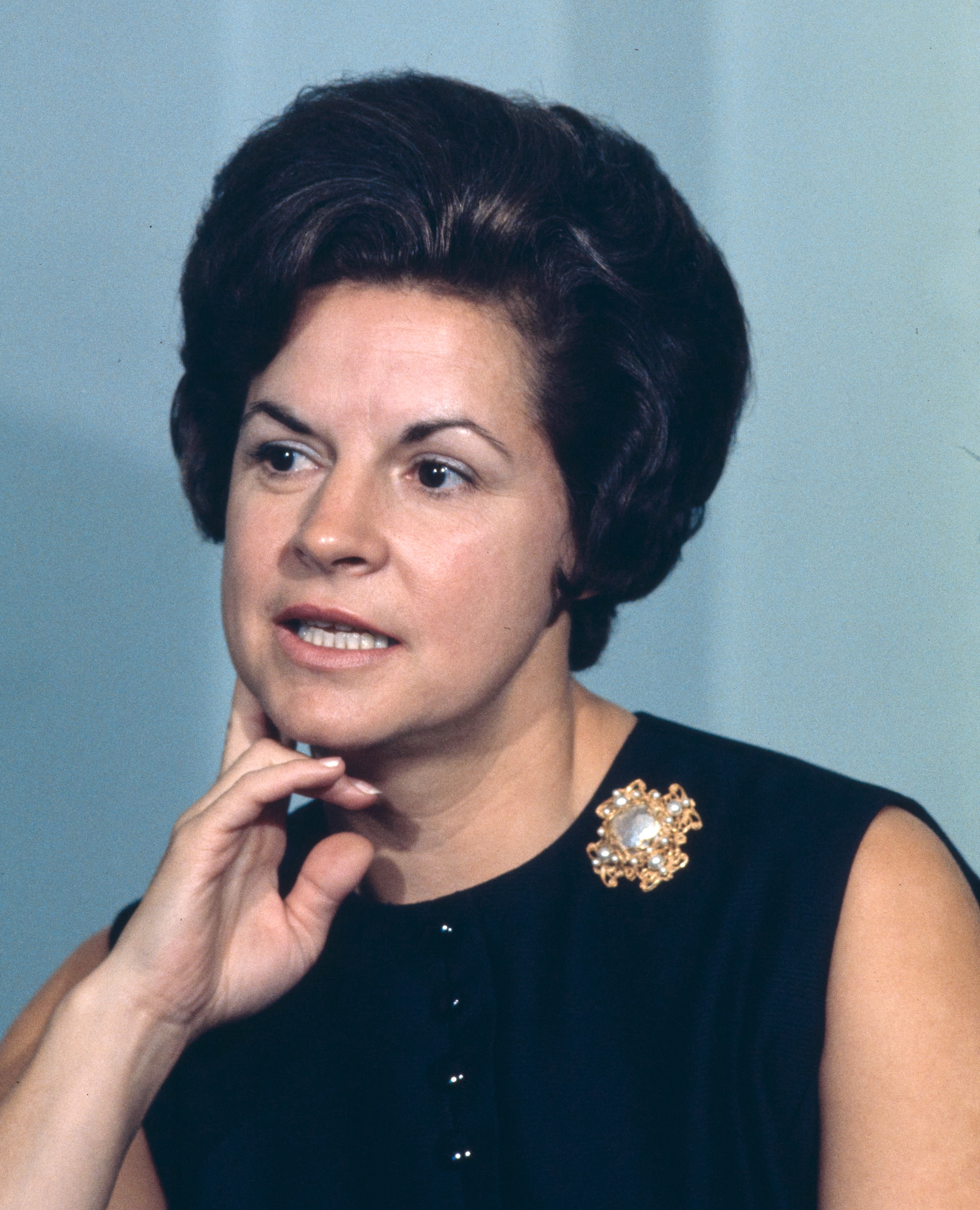
Jane Muskie in 1968

On Friday, February 25, Loeb published a "guest editorial" in the Union Leader that was critical of Muskie's wife, Jane Muskie, entitled "Big Daddy's Jane". The content came from a Newsweek editorial of December 27, 1971, which itself drew from an article written by a reporter with Women's Wear Daily who traveled on the campaign trail with Jane Muskie.

The editorial, as reproduced in the Union Leader, said the reporter "took down all the breezy quotes", which included Jane Muskie saying "Let's tell dirty jokes" to reporters and staff, along with comments about smoking cigarettes and drinking alcohol. The source article in Women's Wear Daily, which ran on December 17, 1971, began with:

BEDFORD, N.H.—"Put your notebooks way, girls, Momma's going to sing tonight." With that, Jane Gray Muskie lit another filter-tip cigarette and invited the members of her traveling press corps to cheese and drinks in her room and dinner at the Steak House in her motel.

The author of the Women's Wear Daily article, Andrea "Kandy" Stroud, felt that Newsweek had "picked up the sensational parts of the story".

== The crying speech ==
On the morning of Saturday, February 26, ten days before the 1972 New Hampshire Democratic presidential primary of Tuesday, March 7, Muskie delivered a speech in front of the offices of the Union Leader. Muskie called Loeb a liar and lambasted him for impugning the character of Jane Muskie. During his speech, Muskie said of Loeb, "By attacking me and my wife, he has proved himself to be a gutless coward."

Most significantly, newspapers reported that Muskie cried openly. David S. Broder of The Washington Post had it that Muskie "broke down three times in as many minutes". David Nyhan of The Boston Globe had Muskie "weeping silently". James M. Naughton of The New York Times wrote, "The Senator broke into tears minutes later, his speech halting", although in later discussion, Naughton said he could not confirm that Muskie cried. On television in New York City, CBS ran film that appeared to show Muskie crying, while ABC had run out of film during the speech, and NBC said they did not receive any film from the event.

Muskie maintained that if his voice cracked, it cracked from anger at Loeb. The tears, Muskie claimed, were actually snow melting on his face. White House aide Pat Buchanan later noted that "as Senator Muskie himself has stated", Muskie's emotion was primarily due to the editorial about his wife, rather than the Canuck letter.

== Effect ==
In early March, Rowland Evans and Robert Novak wrote in their syndicated political column that Muskie had, in their view, committed three errors: first, allowing state-level staff to convince him of a questionable tactical decision (verbally attacking Loeb); second, digressing into topics (the editorial about his wife) not discussed with advisors; and third, losing control of his emotions.

Whether Muskie cried or not, fear of his alleged unstable emotional condition led some New Hampshire Democrats to defect to George McGovern. Loeb was quoted in The Boston Globe stating, "if I was voting (Note: Loeb was a resident of Massachusetts, so was not eligible to vote in New Hampshire.) I wouldn't vote for a man who gets as excited as that, to put his finger on the nuclear button." Muskie's winning margin over McGovern on March 7 in the New Hampshire primary, 46% to 37%, was smaller than his campaign had predicted. The bounce and second-place finish led the McGovern campaign to contrast Muskie's weakness with McGovern's growing strength.

When Muskie finished fourth in the Florida primary of March 14, the Associated Press wrote it "cast doubt" about his status as Democratic front-runner approaching the Wisconsin primary of April 4. After McGovern finished first in seven of Wisconsin's nine congressional districts, McGovern was established as a "major contender" in the race while for Muskie it was "another smashing setback". With additional poor showings in Massachusetts and Pennsylvania on April 25, Muskie suspended his campaign on April 27.

Reflecting on the episode in 1987, David S. Broder wrote, "Muskie never recovered from that Saturday in the snow."

== Authorship of the letter ==
On October 10, 1972, FBI investigators revealed that the Canuck letter was part of a dirty tricks campaign against Democrats orchestrated by the Committee for the Re-Election of the President (CRP, later derisively nicknamed CREEP). Washington Post staff writer Marilyn Berger had reported that, on September 25, White House staffer Ken W. Clawson had bragged to her about authoring the letter. Clawson denied Berger's account. Union Leader publisher Loeb maintained that the letter was not a fabrication, while admitting to having some doubt after receiving another letter claiming that someone had been paid $1,000 to write the Canuck letter. The founder of the drug rehabilitation center in Fort Lauderdale, site of the supposed event described in the letter, said he was present throughout Muskie's visit and, "What Mr. Loeb printed in his newspaper never happened." The purported author of the Canuck letter, a "Paul Morrison" of Deerfield Beach, Florida, was never found.

== See also ==
- Killian documents controversy
- the Ku Klux Klan in Maine
- Zinoviev letter
