= Ratfucking =

American slang term for political sabotage, especially relating to elections

Ratfucking is an American slang term for behind the scenes (covert) political sabotage or dirty tricks, particularly pertaining to elections. It was brought to public attention by Bob Woodward and Carl Bernstein in All the President's Men (1974), the book that chronicled their investigative reporting of the Watergate scandal.

== History ==
=== Origins ===
As a term, ratfucking was commonplace in Southern California and possibly other college slang from the late 1950s to at least the early 1960s, meaning a prank. The lead story in the January 6, 1961, California Tech, Caltech's student newspaper, was headlined, "Tech Scores First Televised RF". The article chronicled the Great Rose Bowl Hoax, which had just taken place involving the University of Southern California (USC). A political context was irrelevant to such usage. At the end of the article, an editor's note both explained and bowdlerized: "RF (for Royal Flush) is a contemporary college colloquialism for a clever prank." In the mid-1960s, Tony Auth was the cartoonist for the Daily Bruin. One of his cartoons showed a large, inebriated rat suggesting to another rat, "Let's go PF-ing tonight!", a play on ratfucking or "RF-ing" with "P" for "people".

The political use of the term was brought to public attention by Bob Woodward and Carl Bernstein in All the President's Men (1974), the book that chronicled their investigative reporting of the Watergate scandal. At USC, future Watergate participants Dwight Chapin, Ron Ziegler, Tim Elbourne, Donald Segretti, Gordon Strachan, and Herbert Porter had been members of Trojans for Representative Government and participated in highly competitive student elections at the school. United Press International reporter Karlyn Barker sent Woodward and Bernstein a memo, "Notes On the USC Crowd", which outlined the connection. USC fraternities, sororities, and underground fraternal coordinating organizations like Trojans for Representative Government engaged in creative tricks and underhanded tactics to win student elections. Officially, control over minor funding and decision-making on campus life was at stake; the positions also gave bragging rights and prestige. The young operators called these practices ratfucking. The tactics were either promoted by or garnered the interest of major political figures on the USC board of trustees, such as Dean Rusk and John A. McCone.

=== Usage ===
The term received media attention in Australia after it was reported that Prime Minister Kevin Rudd used the term in a speech at the 2009 Copenhagen Climate Change Summit.

During the 2016 Republican Party presidential primaries, candidate Ted Cruz said that "Trump may be a rat, but I have no desire to copulate with him", a euphemized reference to the term. That same year, Rolling Stone magazine wrote about the term and Roger Stone.

In August 2017, journalist Marcy Wheeler received the disapproval of the Federal Communications Commission (FCC) when she used the term in a radio broadcast. Wheeler maintained that the word has become a term of art in political science and is thus not an obscenity; FCC officials disagreed.

On May 23, 2019, scholar Svetlana Lokhova filed a claim in the United States District Court for the Eastern District of Virginia against Stefan Halper, claiming that "Stefan Halper is a ratfucker and a spy" with a footnote that "ratfucking" is a well-known political term.

After the results of the 2020 United States presidential election were called for Joe Biden and there were attempts to overturn the 2020 United States presidential election as Trump refused to concede, John Oliver, host of Last Week Tonight with John Oliver, said on one of his shows following the set up of the Trump voter fraud hotline that "a political term for election shenanigans is rat[s fucking]. So if you, say, happen to have any access to images of Pennsylvania-based rats fucking, it's frankly your patriotic duty to send them to the Trump campaign straight away." While saying this, Oliver displayed an image of rats engaged in sexual intercourse titled Stay Up Late and the online link to the voter fraud hotline's website.

In October 2026, during the 2026 United States Senate election in Michigan, a reporter at a campaign rally asked Democratic nominee Abdul El-Sayed whether Representative Haley Stevens, whom he had narrowly defeated in the party's primary, was trying to ratfuck his campaign. El-Sayed laughed and replied, "That is not a question for me!" The exchange followed a public dispute between the two Democrats, after which Stevens had been asked to stay away from El-Sayed's campaign rallies.

== In popular culture ==
The term has also appeared in contemporary television. In the HBO series Succession, the Roy family employs a political fixer known as "Ratfucker Sam", whose primary role is conducting background checks and digging up compromising information on rivals. The character is mentioned in the Season 2 episode 3 "Hunting", when Greg asks Tom about him. The nickname implies a ruthless and meticulous approach to opposition research, reflecting the modern understanding of the term as a label for professionals engaged in covert political and reputational sabotage.

== See also ==
- Innuendo
- Smear campaign
