= Hugh W. Sloan Jr. =

American political advisor

- Born: November 1, 1940 (age 85); Princeton, New Jersey, U.S.
- Education: Princeton University (BA)
- Occupation: Treasurer for the Committee to Re-elect the President (CRP)
- Spouse: Deborah Murray (m. 1971)

Hugh W. Sloan Jr. (born November 1, 1940) is a Republican former treasurer of the Committee to Re-elect the President, Richard Nixon's 1972 campaign committee. Previously, he was an aide to White House Chief of Staff H.R. Haldeman.

He resigned from the Committee to Re-elect over ethics concerns related to actions behind the Watergate scandal. Bob Woodward and Carl Bernstein, in their book All the President's Men, portrayed Sloan as one of the few honest men they interviewed.

== Life and career ==
External videos
- 1973 Watergate Hearings; 1973-06-06; Part 1 of 5, 1:06:29, Library of Congress, American Archive of Public Broadcasting (WGBH and the Library of Congress), Boston, MA and Washington, DC

Sloan was born in Princeton, New Jersey, United States. He attended Hotchkiss and spent his last year of preparatory school at the Aldenham School in Elstree, Hertfordshire, England. He graduated with a B.A. (Honors) from Princeton University in 1963, and then served in the U.S. Navy until 1965.

In 1965, he worked as a fundraiser for the Republican Congressional Campaign Committee, then for the Republican National Finance Committee until 1968.

In 1968, Sloan served as assistant finance director on the Nixon–Agnew Finance Committee, then after the election, served as a personal aide to Nixon on the Presidential Transition Committee until early 1969, when he joined the White House Staff as an assistant to Dwight Chapin on January 20. Under the direction of Chapin, Sloan supervised the mail operation in the appointments office, which included handling all invitations to the president. He was also responsible for staffing and planning White House social functions until early March 1971.

That same year he married Deborah Murray and served as a finance/campaign expert for what was originally the Citizens Committee to Re-Elect the President, then headed by acting director Jeb Magruder, (who became deputy campaign director when John Mitchell resigned from the Justice Department to take up his political duties full-time in 1972). The organization was renamed the Committee for Re-Election of the President (CRP), with Sloan as its treasurer.

Bob Woodward and Carl Bernstein said that Mark Felt told them that Sloan knew nothing about the Watergate burglary or how the money he disbursed was actually used. Sloan resigned when he found out what the White House Plumbers were up to and became a source for Woodward and Bernstein. Sloan was not identified by name in their Washington Post stories about the Watergate scandal, but was in their book about their reporting of it, All the President's Men, in which he was portrayed as one of the few honest men they interviewed.

Sloan subsequently became a trustee of Princeton University. Since 1985, he has been a director of the Manulife Financial Corporation, a Canadian-based financial services group. From 1998 to 2008, he was deputy chairman of Woodbridge Foam, a supplier of urethane technologies to the automotive industry. Sloan is also a director of Wescast Industries, an automotive supplier whose stock trades on the Toronto Stock Exchange.

== Portrayal in film ==
Stephen Collins portrayed Sloan in Alan J. Pakula's 1976 film All the President's Men.
