= Silbert =

Silbert is a surname. Notable people with the surname include:

- Adolphe Silbert, French chess master
- Andrea Silbert, American nonprofit executive
- Earl J. Silbert (1936–2022), American lawyer
- Harvey Silbert (1912–2002), American entertainment lawyer, casino executive and philanthropist
- Leslie Silbert, American novelist
- Maria Silbert (1866–1936), Austrian spiritualist medium
- Mimi Silbert (born 1942), American philanthropist
- Ryan Silbert, filmmaker
