= Harry M. Rosenfeld =

American newspaper editor (1929–2021)

- Born: Hirsch Moritz Rosenfeld; August 12, 1929; Berlin, Weimar Republic
- Died: July 16, 2021 (aged 91); Slingerlands, New York, U.S.
- Education: Syracuse University (BA); Columbia University; New York University
- Occupation: Newspaper Editor
- Spouse: Anne Hahn (m. 1953)
- Website: www.harryrosenfeldmemoir.com

Hirsch Moritz "Harry" Rosenfeld (August 12, 1929 – July 16, 2021) was an American newspaper editor who was the editor in charge of local news at The Washington Post during the Richard Mattingly murder case and the Watergate scandal. He oversaw the newspaper's coverage of Watergate and resisted efforts by the paper's national reporters to take over the story. Though Post executive editor Ben Bradlee gets most of the credit, managing editor Howard Simons and Rosenfeld worked most closely with reporters Bob Woodward and Carl Bernstein on developing the story. Rosenfeld published a memoir including an account of his work at the Post in 2013.

== Early life ==
Rosenfeld was born Hirsch Moritz Rosenfeld to a Jewish family in Berlin on August 12, 1929. His father worked as a furrier. His store was unscathed during Kristallnacht, when his family took refuge in the Polish Embassy in Berlin. They first applied to immigrate to the United States in 1934. After being held up due to the quota system, the application was approved five years later in March 1939, when he was ten. The family settled in The Bronx, New York City just before the Holocaust and Rosenfeld learned to speak English devoid of a German accent. After graduating from Syracuse University in 1952, he served in the U.S. Army as a military historian for two years during the Korean War, attaining the rank of corporal. He was hired as an editor at New York Herald-Tribune. When a strike halted all New York papers for several months in 1963 he was offered a job in television, although chose to return until it ceased publication circa 1966. He was then hired by the Post, initially serving night shifts as deputy foreign editor. He also did graduate work in history and poetry at Columbia University and New York University.

== Career ==
When Rosenfeld moved to the Metro desk at the Post, Bob Woodward, recently discharged from the United States Navy and with no journalism experience, applied for a job and accepted a two-week trial without pay in August 1970. When the trial was up, Woodward had written seventeen stories, not one of which was deemed publishable. Rosenfeld told Woodward to get some experience elsewhere and come back in a year. Woodward frequently scooped the Post at his new paper, the Montgomery County Sentinel, in the Washington suburbs, and kept phoning Rosenfeld for a job. Rosenfeld hired him, right after Labor Day 1971.

Rosenfeld fought to keep Woodward and Bernstein on the Watergate story at the Metro desk instead of giving it to reporters at the National Desk. As noted by Roger Ebert in the 1976 Chicago Sun-Times: "The Watergate story started as a local story, not a national one, and it was a continuing thorn in the side of the Post's prestigious national staff as Woodward and Bernstein kept it as their own."

Washington Post publisher Katharine Graham in her memoirs describes him as "an old-style, tough, picturesque editor, and another real hero of Watergate for us. From the outset, he thought of the story as a very big local one, seeing it as something on which the Post's local staff could distinguish itself. He controlled the story before it regularly made page one of the paper, keeping it going on the front page of the metro section." The Post's attention to detail and strict rules produced, in Rosenfeld's words, "the longest-running newspaper stories with the least amount of errors that I have ever experienced or will ever experience."

In their 1974 account of the Watergate investigation titled All the President's Men, Woodward and Bernstein likened Rosenfeld to a football coach. They described how "he prods his players … pleading, yelling, cajoling." In the 1976 film All the President's Men, he was played by Jack Warden.

Rosenfeld insisted on publishing a story about John F. Kennedy's extramarital affair with Ben Bradlee’s sister-in-law, Mary Pinchot Meyer, then learned he was demoted in the Washington Star.

== Later career ==
Rosenfeld left the Washington Post in 1978 and moved to Albany, New York. He became editor of the Times Union and the Knickerbocker News, which went defunct in 1988. He retired in 1996, becoming the Times Union's editor-at-large. He continued to write weekly columns for that paper throughout his later years.

Rosenfeld wrote From Kristallnacht to Watergate: Memoirs of a Newspaper Man in 2013. The memoir detailed his childhood in 1930s Berlin under Nazi rule and his career path from the New York Herald-Tribune to The Washington Post. Six years later, he authored Battling Editor: The Albany Years, a sequel that described his newspaper editorship and community participation until into his retirement.

== Personal life and death ==
Rosenfeld married Anne Hahn in 1953. They remained married for 68 years until his death. Together, they had three children: Susan, Amy, and Stefanie.

Rosenfeld died at his home in Slingerlands, New York, on July 16, 2021. He was 91, and suffered from COVID-19 related medical issues prior to his death.

== Bibliography ==
- Carl Bernstein and Bob Woodward. All the President's Men. New York: Simon & Schuster, 1974. (ISBN 0-671-21781-X)
- Adrian Havill. Deep Truth: The Lives of Bob Woodward and Carl Bernstein. New York: Birch Lane Press, 1993. ISBN 1-55972-172-3
- Katharine Graham. Personal History. New York: Alfred A. Knopf, 1997. ISBN 0-394-58585-2.
- Rosenfeld, Harry. From Kristallnacht to Watergate: Memoirs of a Newspaper Man. Albany: State University of New York Press, 2013. ISBN 9781438449173
- Rosenfeld, Harry (December 28, 2018). Battling Editor: The Albany Years. SUNY Press. ISBN 9781438473772 – via Google Books. ISBN 9781438473758
