= Donald Segretti =

American attorney

- Born: September 17, 1941 (age 85)
- Occupation: political operative

Donald Henry Segretti (born September 17, 1941, in San Marino, California) is an attorney best known for working as a political operative with then-U.S. President Richard Nixon's Committee to Re-elect the President during the early 1970s. Segretti served four and a half months in prison after investigations related to the Watergate scandal revealed his leading role in extensive political sabotage efforts ("ratfucking") against the Democrats.

== Early life ==
He holds a Bachelor of Science in finance from the University of Southern California (1963) and a Juris Doctor from UC Berkeley School of Law (1966). While at USC, he was a member of the Trojan Knights and initiated into Phi Sigma Kappa fraternity. He was also a member of Trojans for Representative Government with future Watergate scandal participants Dwight L. Chapin, Tim Elbourne, Gordon C. Strachan, Herbert Porter, and Ron Ziegler.

== Watergate ==
External videos
- 1973 Watergate Hearings; 1973-10-03; Part 1 of 5, 1:04:56, Library of Congress, American Archive of Public Broadcasting (WGBH and the Library of Congress), Boston, MA and Washington, DC

Segretti was hired by his friend Dwight L. Chapin to run a campaign of dirty tricks – which Segretti referred to as "ratfucking" – against the Democrats, with his work being paid for by Herb Kalmbach, Nixon's lawyer, from presidential campaign re-election funds gathered before an April 7, 1972 law required that contributors be identified. Segretti's actions were part of the larger Watergate scandal and were important indicators for the few members of the press investigating the Watergate burglary in the early stages that what became known as the Watergate scandal involved far more than just a burglary.

=== Overview of "dirty tricks" against Democrats ===
Segretti's involvement in the "Canuck letter" typifies the tactics Segretti and others working with him used; in this case, they forged a letter ascribed to Senator Edmund Muskie that maligned the people, language, and culture of French Canada and French Canadians, causing that Democratic presidential candidate considerable headaches by having to deny writing the letter and to continue dealing with that recurring issue. Many historians have indicated, over the years, that Muskie's subsequent withdrawal from the presidential primaries was at least partly the result of Segretti and some of the other "ratfuckers" having created so much confusion and so many false accusations that Muskie simply could not respond in any meaningful way.

Another notable example of Segretti's wrongdoing was a letter he faked, on Edmund Muskie's letterhead, falsely alleging that U.S. Senator Henry "Scoop" Jackson, a fellow Democrat, had an illegitimate child with a 17-year-old. The "Muskie letters" also accused Senator Hubert H. Humphrey of sexual misconduct.

After testimony regarding the Muskie letters emerged, Democrats in Florida noted the similarity between those sabotage incidents and others that involved stationery stolen from Humphrey's offices after Muskie dropped out of the race. For example, a false news release on Humphrey's letterhead accused Rep. Shirley Chisholm (D-N.Y.) of being "mentally unbalanced", and a mailing with an unidentified source mischaracterized Humphrey as supporting a controversial environmental measure that he actually opposed.

Segretti appeared as a witness before the Senate Watergate Committee in October 1973.

=== Imprisoned following Watergate conviction ===
In 1974, Segretti pleaded guilty to three misdemeanor counts of distributing illegal campaign literature (including the forgeries described above) and was sentenced to six months in prison. Segretti served four months.

== Later activities ==
Segretti was a lawyer who served as a prosecutor for the U.S. Army and later as a civilian. However, his license was suspended on February 27, 1976. Segretti is currently shown as an active member in good standing of the State Bar of California.

=== Unsuccessful bid for Orange County judgeship ===
In 1995, Segretti ran for a local judgeship in Orange County, California. He quickly withdrew from the race when his campaign sparked lingering anger over memories of his involvement in the Watergate scandal.

=== Orange County co-chair of McCain 2000 primary campaign ===
In 2000, Segretti served as co-chair of John McCain's presidential campaign in Orange County, California.

== In popular culture ==
In the 1976 film All the President's Men, Segretti was portrayed by Robert Walden. The character downplayed the dirty tricks he had undertaken as "Nickel-and-dime stuff. Stuff. Stuff with a little 'wit' attached to it."
