= Judy Hoback Miller =

Bookkeeper for the committee to re-elect President Nixon

- Born: Judith Graham; May 10, 1937 (age 88); Pennsylvania, U.S.
- Spouse(s): James Hoback (1938–1970; his death); Grover Miller (1984–present)

Judith Hoback Miller (born May 10, 1937) acted as an investigative source in the Watergate scandal in 1972 during the presidency of Richard Nixon. She served as the bookkeeper for the Committee for the Re-Election of the President.

== Personal life ==
Miller was born in Pennsylvania, the daughter of Lois (née Litchfield, 1899–1955) and Charles Luther Graham (1895–1951). Her father was an athletic coach at West Chester University with its swimming pool named in his honor. He had served in World War I and is buried at Arlington National Cemetery with her mother. She has a sister, Ross Graham, and a brother David Graham (d. 2013).

Miller was married and had a daughter Kelly with her first husband James Hoback (1938–1970), who died of a heart attack. In 1984, she married Grover Miller, owner of the firm H&M Marketing, for which she worked as the accountant. Miller is retired and lives in Florida with her second husband. Her daughter is a teacher.

== Watergate ==
Miller (then Hoback) was working as the bookkeeper for Richard Nixon's re-election campaign in 1972 when Bob Woodward and Carl Bernstein contacted her for information. Woodward has stated that she was just as important as Deep Throat for unveiling the Watergate Scandal because she had knowledge about where money was going and who it was coming from.

Hoback was one of the few people who talked freely with Woodward and Bernstein, allowing them to come to her home, although she has stated she was "pretty nervous and scared" and was "frustrated that the truth wasn't coming out". She had notified the FBI and felt it was not handling the investigation properly. She revealed to Woodward and Bernstein that evidence of financial misconduct had been destroyed, and some of the committee members, including G. Gordon Liddy and Jeb Stuart Magruder, were receiving payouts from a secret fund. This information advanced the investigation that led to Richard Nixon's resignation as president of the United States.

== Portrayal in media ==
In the 1976 film All the President's Men, actress Jane Alexander portrayed Hoback, who is referred to as "The Bookkeeper" in the screenplay. Alexander met with Hoback to prepare for the role, and the production rented Hoback's former home for her character's scenes with Bernstein, played by Dustin Hoffman. Some historians have criticized the film for downplaying the importance of Hoback's role in the scandal. Alexander was nominated for the Academy Award for Best Supporting Actress for her performance.

In the 2022 television miniseries Gaslit, Hoback, portrayed by actress Marin Ireland, appears more extensively through the FBI's early investigation of the break-in, starting with an interview by two agents cut short by Nixon's White House Counsel John Dean as soon as she mentions having worked for Liddy. At a subsequent midnight diner meeting alone with the agents, Hoback then recounts in detail the operation's principal criminal figures and their activities as well as one particular example of Liddy's bizarre worldviews.

Hoback first told her story on television in the CBS News 1992 special Watergate: The Secret Story, hosted by Mike Wallace and marking 20 years since the Watergate break-in.
