= George Christian (journalist) =

American journalist (1927–2002)

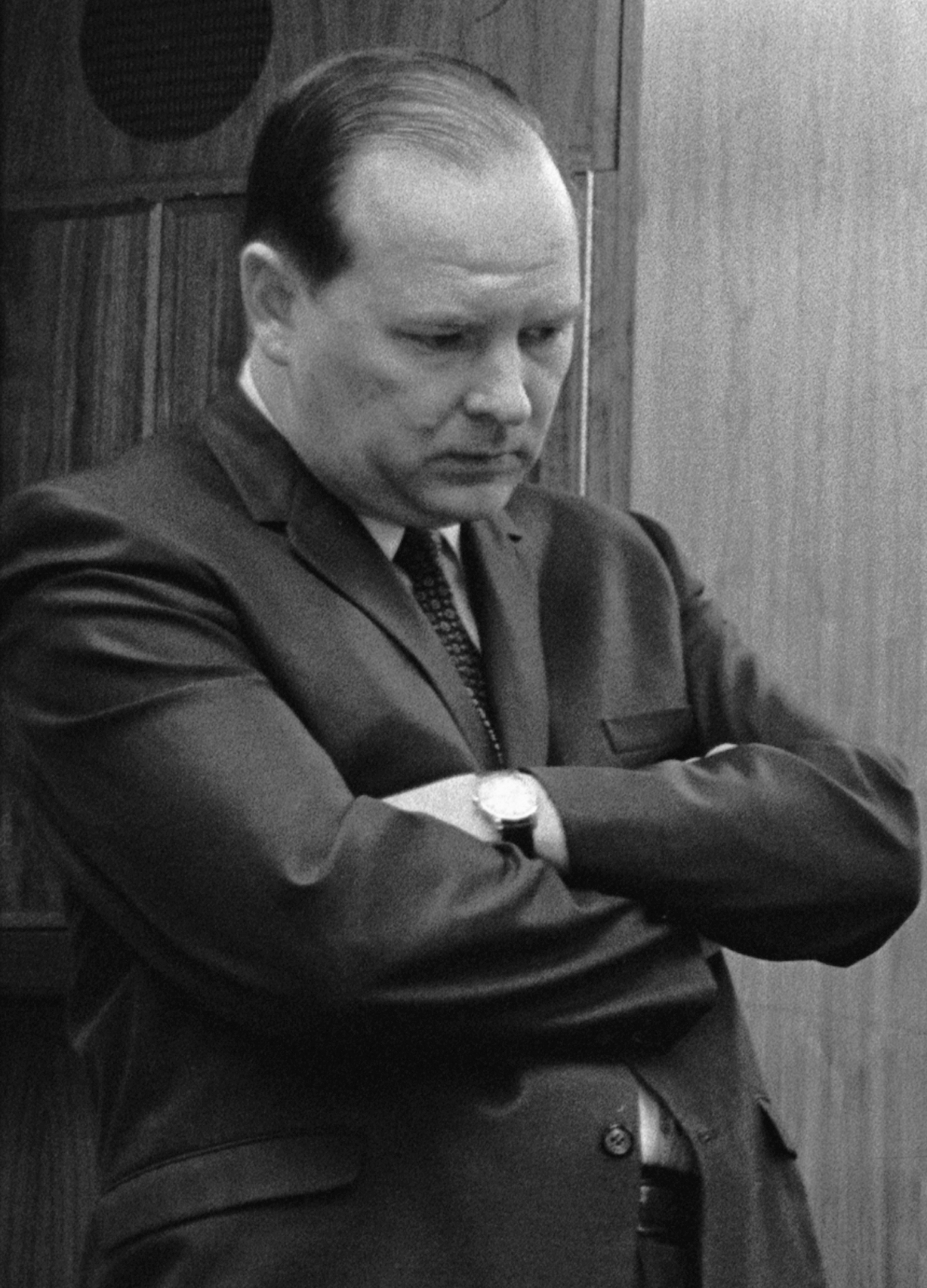
- Christian in 1968

12th White House Press Secretary
- In office February 1, 1967 – January 20, 1969
- President: Lyndon B. Johnson
- Preceded by: Bill Moyers
- Succeeded by: Ron Ziegler

Personal details
- Born: George Eastland Christian Jr. January 1, 1927 Austin, Texas, U.S.
- Died: November 27, 2002 (aged 75) Austin, Texas, U.S.
- Resting place: Texas State Cemetery
- Party: Democratic
- Spouse(s): Elizabeth Brown (d. 1957); Jo Anne Martin
- Children: 6
- Education: University of Texas, Austin (BA)

George Eastland Christian Jr. (January 1, 1927 – November 27, 2002) was an American journalist and White House staffer who served as the 12th White House press secretary from 1966 to 1969.

== Career ==
Christian was born in Austin, Texas, to George Eastland Christian Sr. (1888–1941), a district attorney and a member of the Texas Court of Criminal Appeals, and Ruby Scott (1900–1995). After graduating from Austin High School in 1944, he enlisted in the United States Marine Corps and saw duty in the Pacific theater and in Japan during the occupation.

Upon his discharge from the military, Christian returned to Austin and studied journalism at the University of Texas at Austin under the G.I. Bill of Rights. He subsequently spent seven years covering the Texas state government for the International News Service.

He left journalism for politics, serving as press secretary first for Governors Price Daniel, and then for John B. Connally Jr.

=== White House Press Secretary tenure ===
Christian relocated to Washington, D.C., to join the staff of U.S. President Lyndon B. Johnson. Christian was the White House Press Secretary from 1966 to 1969.

At the close of President Johnson's term of office, Christian returned to Austin.

After leaving government service, he revealed that no one in the White House believed that the 1967 USS Liberty incident was a case of mistaken identity: "There was considerable skepticism in the White House that the attack was accidental. An accident of this magnitude was too much to swallow."

=== Later life ===
After serving as White House Press Secretary, Christian began a career in the private sector in Austin, working in public relations, consulting, and at a lobbying firm. In 1986, Christian founded the Texas Civil Justice League, an organization dedicated to judicial reform, which he operated until his death.

Christian served as vice chairman of the Lyndon Baines Johnson Foundation, member and chairman of the Texas Historical Commission, member of the Texas State Cemetery Committee, and member of the boards of the Headliners Foundation, McDonald Observatory, Texas A&M College of Medicine, and Scott and White Memorial Hospital in Temple, Texas.

His awards include selection as a Distinguished Alumnus of The University of Texas at Austin and an Outstanding Alumnus of the UT College of Communication. He also received the Texas Award for Historical Preservation from the Texas Historical Commission and the Harvey Penick Award from Caritas of Austin. Also in 1982, a centennial professorship in journalism was established in his name at UT Austin.

== Personal life and death ==
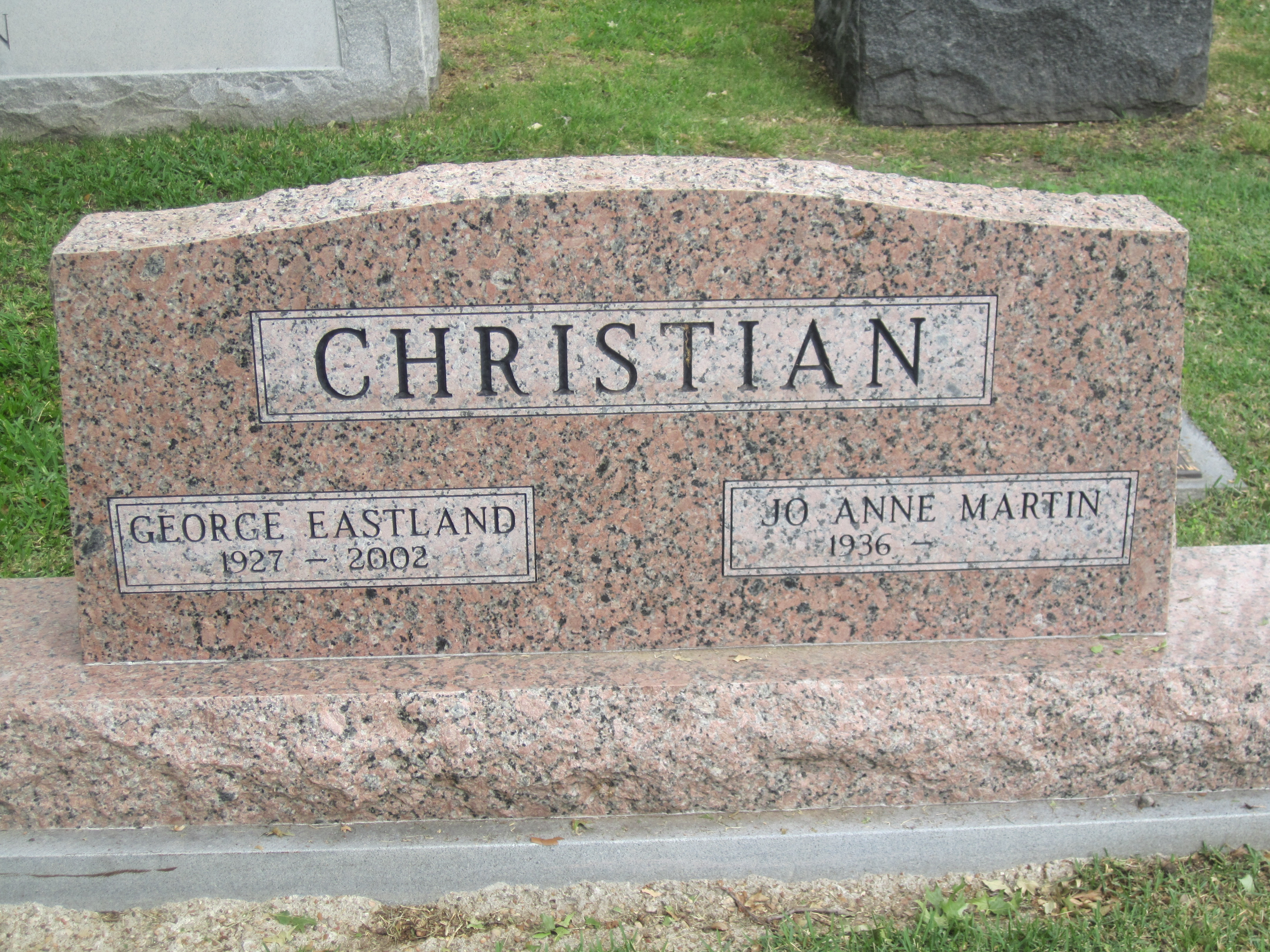
Christian's grave at Texas State Cemetery in his native Austin, Texas.

Christian was married twice, firstly to Elizabeth Brown until she died in 1957 and secondly to Jo Anne Martin (1936–2015), a lawyer and philanthropist. He had six children.

In 1978, his son John, then thirteen years of age, murdered his English teacher at Murchison Middle School, Wilbur Grayson, in front of his classmates with his father's .22 Long Rifle. Following the murder, John spent almost two years in Timberland Hospital in Dallas. John graduated from Highland Park High School in Dallas, and then attended college and law school at the University of Texas at Austin. He is currently an attorney in Austin.

Christian died on November 27, 2002, at the age of 75. Although a parishioner at All Saints Episcopal Church for 40 years, his funeral service was held at University United Methodist church. He is interred at the Texas State Cemetery in Austin, beside his father and mother and near his great-grandfather, Brigadier General Adam Rankin Johnson of the Confederate States Army.

Political offices
Preceded by Bill Moyers	White House Press Secretary; 1967–1969	Succeeded by Ron Ziegler
