= Murder of Richard Mattingly =

1970 murder of an American man

Richard Mattingly was the 63-year-old director of the Condemnation Board of the District of Columbia, the capital of the United States, who was murdered on January 8, 1970, in his home in Arlington, Virginia.

== Background ==
Hitner, Comeau, and Truax had lived in a hippie "crash pad" in an old brownstone at 18th and N in Washington, D.C., that was frequented by many radical and street youth. Hitner, a high school dropout from a working-class community in Pennsylvania, while AWOL had spent his time frequenting the hippie street culture of Georgetown and Dupont Circle, when he was not volunteering at the national offices of the anti-war movement located on Vermont Avenue. These organizations, the Vietnam Moratorium, the New Mobe and the Student Mobilization Committee to End the War in Vietnam (SMC) had just organized the largest anti-war protests and political demonstrations in American history in October and November 1969. (See Opposition to the Vietnam War). Hitner, according to press accounts and stories he had told acquaintances previously, had had extensive combat experiences in Vietnam, and had been involved in certain atrocities.

On January 5, 1970, Hitner met Debra Mattingly, a chronic runaway who had served time in juvenile institutions, at Dupont Circle. They and their milieu began taking LSD on a continuous basis. Both Comeau and Hitner testified at trial that they had aspirations to set up a chapter of the Hells Angels in the Washington, D.C., area, while Mattingly bragged about her familiarity with the rival Pagans.

== Murder ==
A group of local youths, in the company of his 14-year-old adopted daughter, Debra "Muffin" Mattingly, who had run away from home, came to the Mattingly residence to collect some of her belongings. The group included Ken Hitner, a 21-year-old AWOL Marine who had returned from service in the Vietnam War; Eugene Comeau, a 19-year-old Boston native and aspiring musician and biker; and Patricia "Pegasus" Truax, aged 15, all of whom were allegedly under the influence of LSD at the time.

When Richard Mattingly confronted them, Hitner and Comeau beat and strangled him to death with a hammer and a crowbar, the latter of which Mattingly, enraged by their presence in his house with his daughter, had initially brandished. Debra Mattingly allegedly encouraged the perpetrators, while Truax looked on. After Richard Mattingly failed to report to work, his grown son went to his father's house, where he found his body. Hitner, Comeau, Debra Mattingly, and Truax were apprehended on January 12 after fleeing in the victim's car, which was discovered outside an apartment on N Street in the District of Columbia, where the perpetrators had been staying. A search of those premises revealed the murder weapons and certain items belonging to the victim.

== Trial ==
Hitner pleaded guilty to first-degree murder, and in May 1971 was sentenced to 30 years, with five stayed based on his having testified at trial against Comeau, who was convicted and given 30 years. Debra Mattingly, for her part, was sent to a juvenile institution in Florida, after being found mentally incompetent to stand trial in adult court. She was later deprived of any interest in her father's estate as a result of a legal suit filed against her by her brother. Truax, who claimed she had been horrified by these events (notwithstanding testimony that she had talked about being a "witch" at the time and had been an accessory), escaped prosecution, after testifying at trial against Comeau. Hitner later claimed to have embraced Christianity, and attributed his behavior in a statement at sentencing to his experience as a killer in Vietnam, combined with his abuse of LSD, which had made him think he was killing a Viet Cong, as part of a mindset that had given him a depraved indifference to human life.

== Legacy ==
This case was covered in a series of articles written for The Washington Post at the time by Nancy Scannell, the Arlington bureau chief. The defunct Washington Star also covered this story extensively while a Newsweek article in January 1970 cited the case as an example of a 'copycat' Charles Manson gang, and caused some embarrassment to the anti-war organizations for whom Hitner had volunteered. A month later, the infamous Jeffrey MacDonald case emerged, in which MacDonald, who was ultimately convicted, claimed a group of "hippies" on LSD had been the perpetrators. Moreover, coming as it did in the wake of the Manson murders and the Hells Angels melee at the Altamont Free Concert, this episode was seen as further evidence of the decline of utopian hippie culture.
