= 1972 New Hampshire Democratic presidential primary =

- March 7, 1972
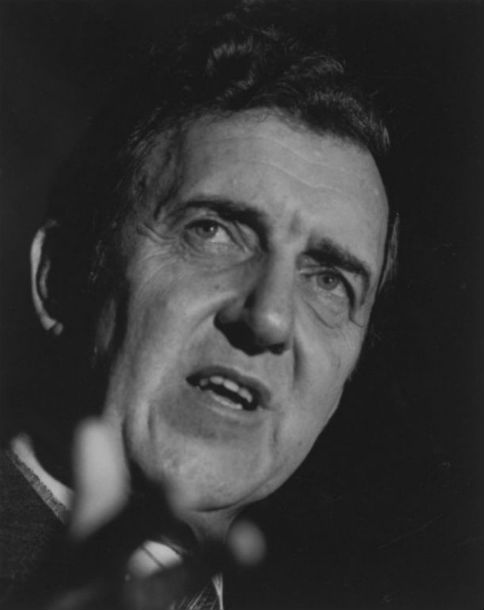

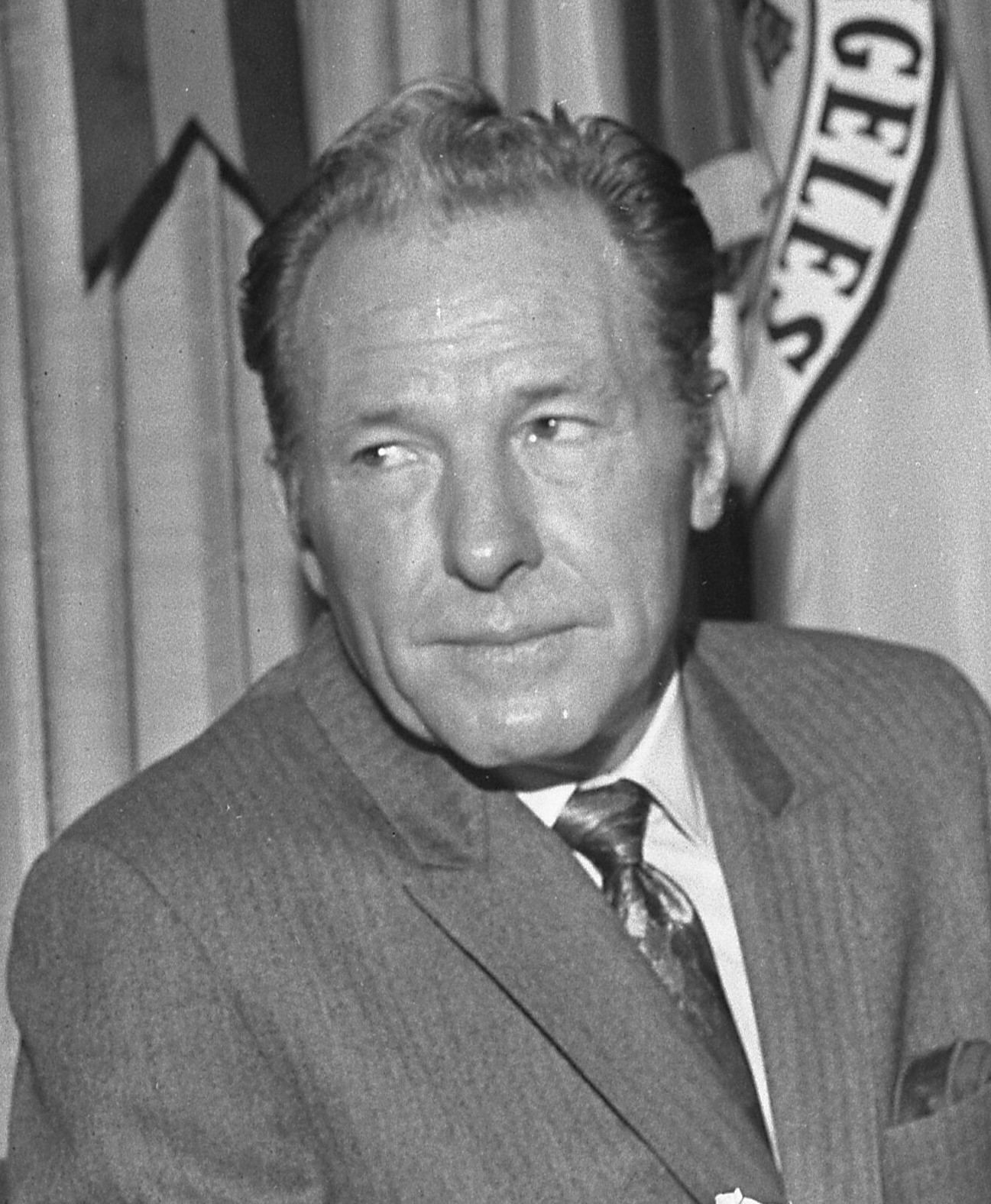
Candidate	Edmund Muskie	George McGovern	Sam Yorty
Home state	Maine	South Dakota	California
Popular vote	41,235	33,007	5,401
Percentage	46.4%	37.1%	6.0%
- County results Muskie: 40-50% 50-60% McGovern: 40-50%

The 1972 New Hampshire Democratic presidential primary was held on March 7, 1972, in New Hampshire as one of the Democratic Party's statewide nomination contests ahead of the 1972 United States presidential election.

== Details ==
The first-in-the-nation primary was won by Edmund Muskie, but by a much narrower margin than expected over his much more liberal opponent, George McGovern. Muskie's surprisingly close victory would slow his momentum to a halt, eventually leading him to drop out of the race altogether. McGovern would go on to become the 1972 Democratic nominee, but he lost to incumbent Republican President Richard Nixon in a 49-state landslide.
