= Gordon C. Strachan =

American lawyer (born 1943)

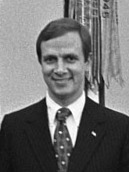
- Strachan c. 1971
- Born: Gordon Creighton Strachan; July 24, 1943 (age 82); Berkeley, California, U.S.
- Education: University of Southern California (BA); University of California, Berkeley (JD)

Gordon Creighton Strachan (born July 24, 1943) is an American attorney and political staffer who served as an aide to H. R. Haldeman, the chief of staff for President Richard Nixon and a figure in the Watergate scandal. He is the last surviving person to be part of the Watergate Seven.

== Early life and education ==
Strachan was born in Berkeley, California. At University of Southern California, he was a member of Trojans for Representative Government with future Watergate scandal participants Dwight L. Chapin, Tim Elbourne, Donald Segretti, Herbert Porter, and Ron Ziegler. In 1965, he received a Bachelor of Arts degree in international relations from the University of Southern California. In 1968, received a Juris Doctor from the UC Berkeley School of Law.

== Career ==
From 1968 until 1970 he worked for the New York City law firm of Mudge, Rose, Guthrie & Alexander, the same firm Nixon worked for before he ran again for the presidency in 1968.

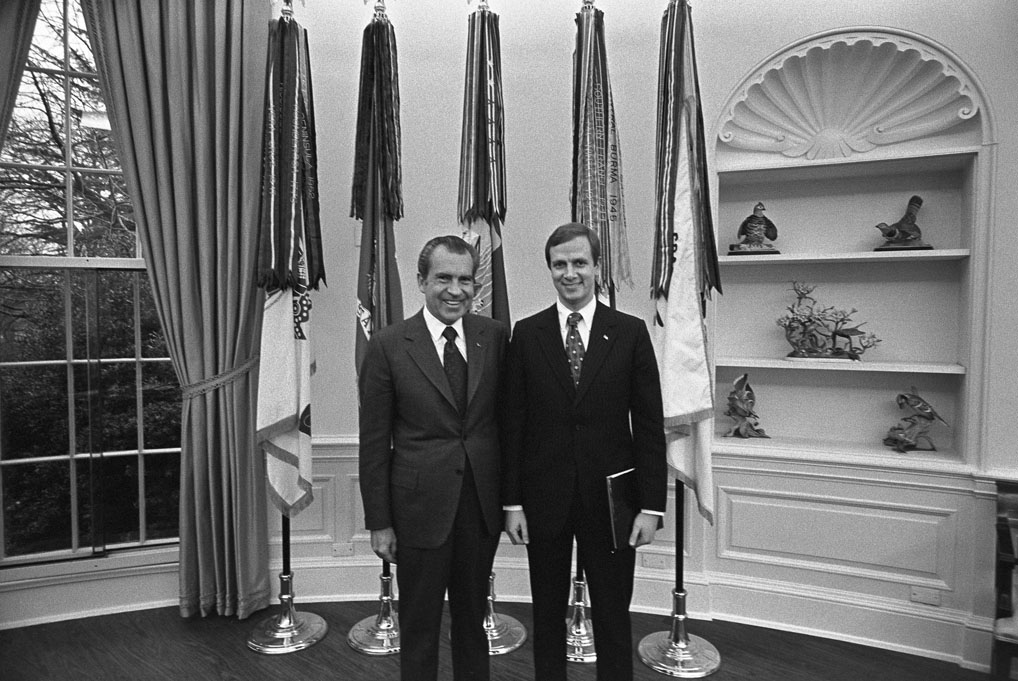
Strachan (right) and Richard Nixon (left) in the Oval Office, circa 1971 during Nixon's Presidency

Strachan, who was recruited by Dwight Chapin, joined the White House Office in 1970 and initially worked as a staff assistant to Herbert G. Klein. He was assigned to be H. R. Haldeman's liaison to the Committee for the Re-Election of the President (CRP) when it was formed in March 1971. His duties at CRP focused on areas that he had previous experience with; as an advance man during 1970 mid-term election campaigns, he oversaw political operations. He testified as such before the United States Senate Watergate Committee and stated that John Dean oversaw all political intelligence-gathering, including the Watergate break-in, at CRP.

Strachan was indicted along with other White House staffers on March 1, 1974, but all charges against him were dropped on June 10, 1975.

He moved to Utah in 1975, and served as a clerk for Berman & Giauque in Salt Lake City. In 1977 his license to practice law was restored in Utah, and he was elevated to a lawyer at the firm, until he left for a partnership at Prince, Yeates & Geldzahler. He was a principal at the law firm, Strachan Strachan & Simon P.C., in Park City, Utah, but is now retired. His practice mainly focused on antitrust, personal injury and business litigation in the recreational sports industry. He served on the Olympic Organizing Committee for the 2002 Winter Games, and is also general counsel to the United States Ski and Snowboard Association. He is the author of several articles on law.

== Sources ==
- "Special Files: Gordon C. Strachan". Nixon Presidential Materials. Archived from the original on April 14, 2005.
- "Firm History". Strachan & Strachan P.C. Archived from the original on February 7, 2005.
- John Ehrlichman: In the Eye of the Storm, Hosted by Tom Clancy (1997) Video. ISBN 0-9665154-0-4
