= Seymour Glanzer =

American lawyer

Seymour Glanzer (May 22, 1926 – April 3, 2018) was an American lawyer who served as one of the Watergate prosecutors from 1972–1973.

Born and raised in New York City, Glanzer graduated from Juilliard with a B.S. degree in 1955. He received his LL.B. from New York Law School in 1960 after attending New York University. Glanzer was admitted to the bar in New York (1961), the District of Columbia(1965) and the U.S. Supreme Court (1967).

From 1965 to early 1967, Glanzer served as Assistant U.S. Attorney, prosecuting general criminal cases. He then became Chief of the Anti-Fraud Section of the U.S. Attorney's Office in Washington, DC, a position he held starting in 1967, when that section was established. The section focused on the investigation and prosecution of major "white collar" offenses and became a model for the establishment of specialized units of this type in other U.S. Attorneys' and state prosecutors' offices nationwide. The section handled regulatory violations involving government agencies, relating to securities, banking, housing, labor, small business, healthcare, and customs, along with major corporate, business, and commercial crimes, including tax and bid-rigging violations. It also pioneered the prosecution of consumer fraud cases in federal court. Glanzer received special commendations from the Department of Justice in 1971 and 1973, and from the Attorney General in 1974, for his outstanding performance as a prosecutor.

After serving as Chief of the Anti-Fraud Section of the D.C. United States Attorney's Office and also as one of the three original Watergate prosecutors (alongside Donald E. Campbell and Earl J. Silbert), Glanzer joined Dickstein Shapiro LLP as partner in 1974. He became senior counsel at the firm in 1998, and represented clients caught up in complex commercial and business disputes, often featuring financial irregularities.

Glanzer died in April 2018 in Washington, D.C. of heart failure.
