= Herbert W. Kalmbach =

American lawyer (1921–2017)

- Born: Herbert Warren Kalmbach; October 19, 1921; Port Huron, Michigan, US
- Died: September 15, 2017 (aged 95); Newport Beach, California, US
- Education: University of Southern California (B.A., J.D.)
- Occupation: Lawyer
- Known for: Watergate figure
- Political party: Republican
- Board member of: Bank of Newport; Arizona Title Insurance Trust Company; 552 Club of Hoag Memorial Presbyterian Hospital; Balboa Bay Club; Lincoln Club; Pacific Club
- Children: 3

Herbert Warren Kalmbach (October 19, 1921 – September 15, 2017), commonly referred to as Herb Kalmbach, was an American attorney and banker. He served as the personal attorney to United States President Richard Nixon (1968–1973). He became embroiled in the Watergate scandal due to his fundraising activities in the early 1970s, some of which supported undercover operatives directed by senior White House figures under Nixon. Kalmbach was convicted and served 191 days in jail for his part in the scandal, and lost his license to practice law for a time, although he was later reinstated.

== Education, early career ==
Kalmbach was born on October 19, 1921, in Port Huron, Michigan. He earned both his undergraduate and law degrees at the University of Southern California, and was admitted to the bar in 1952. He was a real estate lawyer and founding partner of Kalmbach, DeMarco, Knapp & Chillingworth.

== Meets Nixon, political fundraiser ==
Kalmbach was introduced to Richard Nixon, then vice-president, by H. R. Haldeman in the 1950s. He raised money for Richard Nixon's candidacy in the 1960 United States presidential election and again in the 1968 United States presidential election.

== Banker, becomes Nixon's attorney ==
Kalmbach declined Nixon's offer to appoint him Under Secretary of Commerce, choosing instead to remain in California and build up his law practice, becoming the former Vice President's private lawyer. His law firm prospered during this period; it employed two lawyers in 1968, 14 in 1970, and 24 by 1973. The presidential connection drew United Airlines, Dart Industries, Marriott Corporation, and MCA Inc. as clients. During this period Kalmbach founded the Bank of Newport, in Newport Beach, California. The firm performed routine legal chores for the President.

== Arranges private polling ==
Kalmbach was involved in a secret Nixon polling operation hidden from all but his closest senior advisors. Nixon used the poll results to shape policy and campaign strategy and manipulate popular opinion. On December 21, 1971, Kalmbach set up a Delaware shell corporation with private funding, to hide Administration sponsorship of polls.

== Joins 1972 re-election campaign ==
Kalmbach was also the Deputy Finance Chairman for the Committee to Re-elect the President. In this capacity he was eventually implicated in a fund-raising scandal involving re-election campaign contributions by Associated Milk Producers, Inc. (AMPI) and two other major dairy-farm cooperatives in connection with Nixon's support of an increase in price supports for milk in 1971. Testimony by AMPI general manager George L. Mehrens in 1973 identified Kalmbach as a major solicitor of these contributions. Articles on Charles Colson's involvement in the AMPI scandal indicated that $2 million in contributions had been expected, but that the actual donations were nearer to $400,000, of which some $197,500 had been given by AMPI.

== Manages finances for undercover operations ==
Kalmbach handled a secret $500,000 fund to finance the sabotage and espionage operations of Donald Segretti.

== Convicted, imprisoned ==
Kalmbach was associate finance chairman of the 1968 Nixon for President campaign and was an unofficial fund-raiser for the Committee for the Re-election of the President, controlling several secret funds. Kalmbach served six months in jail and was fined $10,000 for operating an illegal campaign committee and for offering an ambassadorship in return for political support. He also handled a secret $500,000 fund to finance sabotage and espionage operations in the salary of Donald H. Segretti, a lawyer, whose job it was to discredit the Democrats.including $30,000 to $40,000 in 1972 alone for spying on Democrats. Segretti was paid from re-election funds gathered before the April 7, 1972, cutoff point after which a new law required full disclosure of contributors; Kalmbach told investigators in early 1973 that he had destroyed the contribution records prior to the April 7 date, violating the Federal Corrupt Practices Act, which required the records be maintained for two years and which expired only as of the new law's going into effect. Kalmbach claimed in a later FBI interview that he had not known who was supervising Segretti nor what activities he was being paid to perform. Kalmbach also raised $220,000 in "hush money" to pay off the Watergate burglars. He claimed that he was told the money was for lawyer's fees; a claim he accepted because he felt the burglars wrongly believed that they were acting on authority.

But it was his raising of $3.9 million for a secret Republican congressional campaign committee and promising an ambassador a better post in exchange for $100,000 that led to his conviction and imprisonment for 191 days and a $10,000 fine. Kalmbach pleaded guilty on February 25, 1974, on one count of violation of the Federal Corrupt Practices Act and on one count of promising federal employment as a reward for political activity and support of a candidate. He was sentenced to serve 6 to 18 months in prison for the first count and 6 months in prison on the second count. He executed both sentences concurrently and was released from prison on January 5, 1975. Kalmbach lost his license to practice law, although he was reinstated in 1977.

== Later life ==
Although he retired in the late 1980s, he remained of counsel to Baker Hostetler. He died on September 15, 2017, in Newport Beach, California.
