= Committee for the Re-Election of the President =

Richard Nixon reelection campaign group

The Committee for the Re-election of the President (or the Committee to Re-elect the President, CRP, but often mocked by the acronym CREEP) was, officially, a fundraising organization of United States president Richard Nixon's 1972 re-election campaign during the Watergate scandal. In addition to fundraising, the organization was engaged in political sabotage against Nixon's opponents, the various Democratic Party politicians running in the presidential election.

== History ==
Planning began in late 1970 and an office opened in the spring of 1971. Besides its re-election activities, CRP employed money laundering and slush funds, and was involved in the Watergate scandal. According to CRP member Donald Segretti, members actively attempted to sabotage Democratic candidates.

=== Edmund Muskie sabotage ===
In an effort to sabotage Democratic candidate Edmund Muskie, then a presidential candidate, the CRP circulated a fabricated document, called the "Canuck letter", in an effort to ruin his reputation and destroy his chances in the 1972 New Hampshire primary by framing him as biased against Americans of French-Canadian descent.

=== Failed attempt to sabotage George Wallace ===
In California, the CRP aimed to get George Wallace's American Independent Party (AIP) knocked off the ballot in the 1972 presidential election. They feared that he would split the vote in a 3-way race, and without him believed Wallace voters would go for Nixon. As part of this plan, in 1971 the CRP offered to pay Joseph Tommasi, a Californian neo-Nazi, US$5,000, equivalent to $39,749 in 2025, to help. Tommasi was told to convince AIP voters to register instead as Republican; due to California's election rules, if there were too few registered voters for a party, they would be knocked off the ballot. The goal was to get the AIP's numbers either below 11,000 or less than 1/15th of 1% of all registered voters in the state.

The AIP's voter registration actually rose during the period the plan was enacted. Tommasi's involvement was also a failure, as he only came up with 4 men for the plan instead of his promised 20. Tommasi was paid less than he was promised (US$1,200 vs US$5,000), and claimed the CRP had cheated the Nazis. In response, Tommasi leaked the story to the press. This initially resulted in only local news reports, but after the reveal of the Watergate scandal and CRP's implication in it, the story made national news, including in The New York Times. Hugh W. Sloan Jr. testified about the plan to the Watergate Commission.

Robert Walters, the high-profile right-wing activist who created the plan, initially denied any tie to the CRP and said he had come up with the idea on his own. He also said he did not remember the Nazis. Another participant in the plan disputed Walters's telling of events; reporters ultimately found checks from Walters to Tommasi, after which Walters conceded that the neo-Nazis "might have been involved". The plan was described by the Watergate Committee as a "complete failure numerically, according to all participants", though the Los Angeles Free Press noted it had perhaps worked out for Tommasi.

=== Watergate ===
The CRP used $500,000 in funds raised to re-elect President Nixon to pay legal expenses for the five Watergate burglars. This act helped turn the burglary into an explosive political scandal. The burglars, as well as G. Gordon Liddy, E. Howard Hunt, John N. Mitchell, and other Nixon administration figures (Watergate Seven), were indicted over the break-in and their efforts to cover it up.

The acronym CREEP became popular due to the Watergate scandal.

== Legacy ==
Writing for Time magazine, Jonathan van Harmelen wrote that "the tactics pioneered by members of Trojans for Representative Government and later CREEP set a precedent for the sort of organized political sabotage that has become commonplace today in a digital world".

== Prominent members ==
- Charles Colson, special counsel to the president
- Kenneth H. Dahlberg, Midwest finance chairman; developer of the Miracle-Ear hearing aid
- Francis L. Dale, chairman; publisher of The Cincinnati Enquirer; owner of the Cincinnati Reds
- E. Howard Hunt, consultant to the White House; retired CIA operative
- Herbert W. Kalmbach, deputy finance chairman; President Nixon's personal attorney
- Fred LaRue, deputy director; aide to John Mitchell
- G. Gordon Liddy, finance counsel; former aide to John Ehrlichman
- Clark MacGregor, chairman
- Jeb Stuart Magruder, deputy director
- Fred Malek, manager, former deputy undersecretary of health, education, and welfare
- James W. McCord, Jr., security coordinator; former director of security at the Central Intelligence Agency
- Judy Hoback Miller, bookkeeper
- John N. Mitchell, director; former United States attorney general
- Donald Segretti, political operative
- DeVan L. Shumway, spokesman
- Hugh W. Sloan, Jr., treasurer; former aide to White House chief of staff H.R. Haldeman
- Maurice Stans, finance chairman; former United States secretary of commerce
- Roger Stone, political operative

== See also ==
- Young Voters for the President
- White House Plumbers
