= Leslie Silbert =

American novelist

Leslie Silbert is an American writer who has worked as a private investigator. In 2004, she published her first novel The Intelligencer, a spy story based on an incident in the life of the British 16th-century author Christopher Marlowe.

Silbert was inspired to write the novel when studying Elizabethan drama at Oxford University. On returning to New York City, she joined a private investigation business where she was guided by a former CIA agent. After working there for about a year, she left to devote her time to writing her novel.

The Intellegencer has been translated into Dutch as De verspieder, German as Der Marlowe-Code (2004), Polish as Szpieg, wieczny tułacz (2004), Spanish as El informante (2005), Portuguese as A anatomia do segredo (2006), French as Le manuscrit du maître-espion : roman (2007) and Croatian as Obavještajac (2008).

She is the daughter of Watergate prosecutor Earl J. Silbert.
