= Jeb Stuart Magruder =

American businessman and political operative (1934–2014)

Jeb Magruder
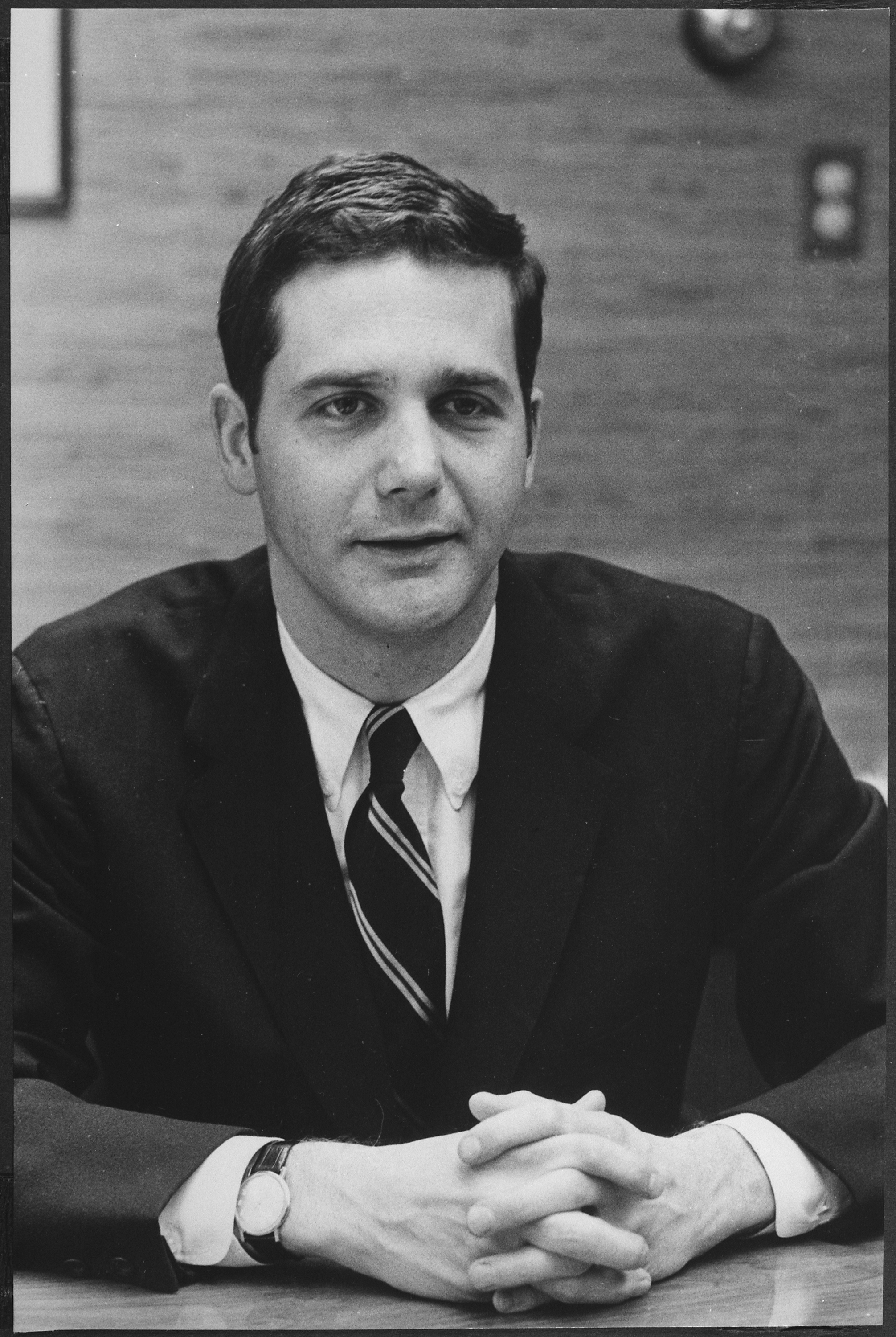
- Magruder in 1970

Personal details
- Born: Jeb Stuart Magruder; November 5, 1934 New York City, New York, U.S.
- Died: May 11, 2014 (aged 79) Danbury, Connecticut, U.S.
- Party: Republican
- Education: Williams College (BA); University of Chicago (MBA); Princeton Theological Seminary (MDiv)

Jeb Stuart Magruder (November 5, 1934 – May 11, 2014) was an American businessman and high-level political operative in the Republican Party who served time in prison for his role in the Watergate scandal.

He served President Richard Nixon in various capacities, including acting as special assistant to the President for domestic policy development, and later as deputy director of the president's 1972 re-election campaign, Committee for the Re-Election of the President (CRP). In August 1973, Magruder pleaded guilty to one count of conspiracy to wiretap, obstruct justice and defraud the United States. He served seven months in federal prison.

Magruder later attended Princeton Theological Seminary and was ordained as a Presbyterian minister. He spoke publicly about ethics and his role in the Watergate scandal. In the 1990s and early 2000s, he gave interviews in which he changed his accounts of actions by various participants in the Watergate coverup, including claiming that Nixon ordered the break-ins.

== Early life ==
External videos
- 1973 Watergate Hearings; 1973-06-14; Part 1 of 6, 1:04:59, Library of Congress, American Archive of Public Broadcasting (WGBH and the Library of Congress), Boston, MA and Washington, DC

Jeb Stuart Magruder was born and grew up in the Fort Wadsworth section of Staten Island, New York, the son of middle-class printing company owner Donald Dilworth Magruder and his wife, Edith Woolverton Magruder.

Magruder's paternal family had roots in southern Maryland, and his ancestors sided with the Confederacy during the American Civil War. His great-grandfather smuggled shoes for the Confederacy during the conflict, and Magruder's father, a Civil War buff and horseman, named Magruder after Confederate general and cavalry officer J.E.B. Stuart. "My father's political views were very much those of a conservative Southerner, including his views on race," Magruder wrote in his autobiography.

Magruder's grandfather Robert Magruder moved from Baltimore to Staten Island in 1899, eventually becoming president of Johnson Shipyard Corporation in Mariner's Harbor. In 1921, however, he was indicted for bank fraud related to the construction of World War I cargo ships. He was subsequently convicted and spent six months in prison, depleting the family's financial resources.

Magruder's father served in World War I in France with the 27th Infantry Division and returned to work for his father's shipyard corporation as well as a printing company he had started with his brother. He married Edith Woolverton in 1923. Magruder was the second of their two children, born in November 1934 after his brother, Don, was born in June 1930.

Magruder attended public schools on Staten Island. He was an honor student at Curtis High School and excelled in tennis and swimming.

After two years at Williams College, where he joined Phi Delta Theta and competed on the swimming team, Magruder took a leave of absence to serve in the U.S. Army. But he was kicked out of Officer Candidate School of the United States Army at Fort Sill, Oklahoma, only weeks before graduation for going AWOL by skipping a study hall to take the daughter of a colonel out in a new Chevrolet. He was then stationed in South Korea. He returned to Williams in the fall of 1956 and earned a Bachelor of Arts in political science in 1958.

Magruder started at IBM after college, but dropped out of its training program after only a few days. He moved to San Francisco, got a sales job with the Crown Zellerbach Corporation, and began dating Gail Barnes Nicholas, then a student at the University of California at Berkeley. Magruder and Nicholas, the daughter of a prominent attorney from Los Angeles, were married in Los Angeles on October 17, 1959. Around the same time, Crown Zellerbach transferred Magruder to Kansas City to sell the company's paper products throughout Iowa, Kansas, Missouri and Nebraska.

== Marriage and family ==
Magruder married Gail Barnes Nicholas on October 17, 1959, in Los Angeles. The couple had four children. They were divorced in 1984.

Magruder married Patricia Newton on February 28, 1987, in Columbus, Ohio. They were divorced in May 2003.

== Business career and politics ==
Magruder became involved in Kansas City as a campaign manager for the Republican Party during the 1960 election campaign, working as chairman of an urban ward.

He moved to Chicago in 1961 to attend the University of Chicago's night MBA program and took a job as the manager of the consulting firm Booz Allen Hamilton's local office. In Chicago, he again was involved with politics and the Republican Party. Magruder served as a ward chairman for Donald Rumsfeld's 1962 Illinois's 13th congressional district United States House of Representatives Republican primary campaign. Rumsfeld won the primary and the seat in Congress.

In 1962 Magruder moved from Booz Allen Hamilton to Jewel, a regional grocery firm. During his nearly four years with them, he was promoted to merchandise manager.

Magruder became involved with the Illinois organization of the Barry Goldwater presidential campaign in late 1963, but became disillusioned with Goldwater's political views. He worked briefly as campaign manager for Richard Ogilvie's 1966 campaign for president of the Cook County Board of Supervisors. The political workload, combined with work pressures, caused Magruder to end employment with Jewel.

In mid-1966, he returned to California, to begin a job with the Broadway Stores. In mid-1967, he served as Southern California coordinator for the Richard Nixon presidential campaign. He left early in 1968 due to internal organizational problems.

Magruder entered partnership during early 1969 with two other entrepreneurs to start two new businesses, and became president and chief executive officer of these firms.

== White House staff ==
Magruder was appointed to the White House staff in 1969, as special assistant to the president, and moved with his family to Washington, D.C. Magruder was recruited to the White House staff by Chief of Staff H.R. Haldeman, who gave Magruder the task of helping "organize a more effective White House public relations program." In 1970, he moved to the Office of Communications, serving as deputy director under Communications Director Herbert G. Klein.

In that role, Magruder authored an October 17, 1969, memorandum to Haldeman entitled "The Shotgun versus the Rifle" which suggested that the Nixon administration take systematic action against media outlets perceived as unfavorable rather than complain to individual editors and reporters after stories that annoyed the president and his deputies: "I suggested that we might begin an unofficial monitoring system of the media through the FCC to see if unfair coverage could be documented; we might have the Justice Department's antitrust division look into possible violations among various news empires; we might have the IRS investigate the networks and newspapers most hostile to us; we might play favorites with the media, as I noted, the Kennedy Administration had; finally, we might have the Republican National Committee set up a major letter-writing program." Magruder later cast the memo as an attempt to dissuade Haldeman from pressing the White House communications staff to continually hector the press for perceived unfair coverage.

=== Committee to Re-elect the President ===
Magruder served in the White House until the spring of 1971, when he left to manage the Committee for the Re-Election of the President (CRP, also known as CREEP by Nixon's opponents), first as director. By early 1972 in the election year, Attorney General John N. Mitchell took over as director of CRP and Magruder acted as his deputy. As Mitchell became preoccupied with a scandal involving the ITT Corporation and by his efforts to restrain his outspoken wife Martha, Magruder took on more of the management of the CRP.

The 1972 campaign to re-elect the President won 49 of 50 states. Nixon lost only Massachusetts and the District of Columbia to Democrat George McGovern. The final tally of Nixon's victory was 520 to 17 electoral votes, the second largest Electoral College (United States) margin in history up until then, after Franklin D. Roosevelt's 1936 victory over Alf Landon, (523 to 8).

=== Manages 1973 Inaugural ===
Magruder worked as inaugural director from October 1972 to arrange Nixon's United States presidential inauguration ceremony and celebration in January 1973. In March 1973, he began a job as director of policy planning with the United States Department of Commerce. He resigned soon afterward, as the Watergate scandal began to heat up and become scrutinized again by media following James McCord's disclosures of perjury during the original Watergate trial of the five burglars; the former Watergate burglar wrote about this to the Washington Star.

== Watergate scandal ==
Magruder, in his role with CRP, was involved with the Watergate matters from an early stage, including its planning, execution, and cover-up.

=== Liddy plan ===
Magruder met with White House Counsel John Dean and John Mitchell on January 27 and February 4, 1972, to review preliminary plans by G. Gordon Liddy (Counsel to CRP) for intelligence gathering ideas for the 1972 campaign. The Watergate burglaries would evolve from those meetings. From the day they met in December 1971, Magruder and Liddy (who had been hired by Mitchell and Dean) had a conflicted personal relationship.

=== Cooperates with prosecutors ===
During April 1973, Magruder began cooperating with federal prosecutors. In exchange, Magruder was allowed to plead guilty in August 1973 to a one-count indictment of conspiracy to obstruct justice, to defraud the United States, and to illegally eavesdrop on the Democratic Party's national headquarters at the Watergate Hotel and Office Building. During this time, Magruder also engaged in a speaking tour on college campuses and in other public spaces, inspiring some critics to suggest he had profited from the scandal and his decision to turn state's evidence. On May 21, 1974, Magruder was sentenced by Judge John Sirica to ten months to four years for his role in the failed burglary of Watergate and the following cover-up. After his sentencing, Magruder said, "I am confident that this country will survive its Watergates and its Jeb Magruders." In the end, he served three months of his sentence at a Federal minimum security prison in Allenwood, Pennsylvania, and was moved for the remaining four months (before Sirica's pardon) to a "safe house prison" at the Fort Holabird Base in Baltimore Harbor, along with Chuck Colson, John Dean and Herb Kalmbach, due to threats on the four by inmates at Allenwood.

Magruder originally testified that he knew nothing to indicate that President Nixon had any prior knowledge of the Watergate burglary.

In his book, An American Life: One Man's Road to Watergate (1974), he wrote,

I know nothing to indicate that Nixon was aware in advance of the plan to break into the Democratic headquarters. It is possible that Mitchell or Haldeman told him in advance, but I think it's likelier that they would not have mentioned it unless the operation had produced some results of interest to him.

This book was published before Magruder's sentencing on May 21, and before Nixon resigned as the president.

Magruder had testified that he thought that he was helping establish a legal intelligence-gathering operation. In his book Magruder wrote about former attorney general John Mitchell and Fred LaRue meeting in late March 1972 in Key Biscayne, Florida. He wrote that Mitchell approved the plan to eavesdrop on the Watergate complex soon after this meeting.

== After Watergate ==
After his prison term, Magruder published a Christian-oriented memoir, From Power to Peace in 1976. He earned a Master of Divinity (M.Div.) degree from Princeton Theological Seminary in 1981 and became ordained as a Presbyterian minister. He served as associate minister at the First Presbyterian Church in Burlingame, California and First Community Church of Columbus, Ohio. (While there, Magruder chaired that city's Commission on Ethics and Values for a time.) In May 1983, President Ronald Reagan denied a request from Magruder for a presidential pardon.

In 1990 Magruder was called as senior pastor at the First Presbyterian Church of Lexington, Kentucky. In 1995, Kentucky Governor Brereton Jones reinstated Magruder's right to vote, and campaign for public office in the state.

=== Continued controversy ===
In 1990 Magruder consented to interviews with authors Len Colodny and Robert Gettlin while the two were conducting research for their 1991 book Silent Coup: The Removal of a President (St. Martin's Press). Magruder admitted that he had lied to prosecutors, to the Senate's Watergate Committee, and in his 1974 book An American Life: One Man's Road to Watergate, concerning aspects of the early cover-up.

To Colodny and Gettlin, he said that he had called John Dean several hours after the (second) Watergate break-in was discovered, and that Dean set in motion several cover-up strategies. This version of events tallied closely with that of Liddy, as set out in his 1980 book Will. Books published earlier by others, however, such as Magruder's in 1974 and Dean's Blind Ambition (1976), had become the accepted 'truth' of the cover-up. These versions had very profound and damaging effects on the reputations of senior figures such as Haldeman, John Ehrlichman and Mitchell.

To Colodny and Gettlin, Magruder admitted specifically instructing Liddy on the second Watergate break-in, something which he had earlier denied. At the time these interviews were conducted, Magruder was a Presbyterian minister in Columbus, Ohio.

In 2003 Magruder was interviewed again, by PBS researchers and the Associated Press. According to his account in a PBS documentary, Watergate Plus 30: Shadow of History, and in an interview with the Associated Press, he asserted that Nixon knew about the Watergate burglary early in the process, and well before the scandal broke. During the 2003 interviews, Magruder said that he had attended a meeting with Mitchell on March 30, 1972, at which he heard Nixon tell Mitchell by telephone to begin the Watergate plan. This account, however, has been contested by Fred LaRue. LaRue, who was the only other person present at the meeting in which the alleged telephone call from Nixon to Mitchell occurred, has said that no telephone call from Nixon to Mitchell took place during this meeting. Magruder is the only direct participant of the scandal to claim that Nixon had specific prior knowledge of the Watergate burglary, and that Nixon directed Mitchell to proceed with the burglary. These statements contradict Magruder's earlier accounts that the cover-up had reached no higher in the Administration than Mitchell.

In his 1974 book, Magruder had said that the only telephone call from the White House during this meeting came from H.R. Haldeman's aide, Gordon C. Strachan. Sixteen years later, in the August 7, 1990 interview with Colodny and Gettlin, Magruder changed his account, claiming that the telephone call from the White House came from Haldeman himself. In 2003, Magruder changed his account again, saying that President Nixon had telephoned Mitchell at the Key Biscayne meeting.

== Later years ==
Magruder retired first to Colorado Springs and later to the Short North area of Columbus, Ohio. On July 23, 2007, Magruder was hospitalized after crashing his car into a motorcycle and a truck on State Route 315 in Columbus. It was reported that Magruder had suffered a stroke while driving. He was charged with failure to maintain an assured clear distance and failure to stop after an accident or collision. Magruder pleaded guilty in January 2008 to a charge of reckless operation stemming from the crashes with two vehicles in July. His license was suspended and he was fined $300.

=== Death ===
Magruder moved to be near family in Danbury, Connecticut in 2012, and died at age 79 on May 11, 2014, due to complications from a stroke.

He is played by Ike Barinholtz in the 2023 miniseries, White House Plumbers.

== Sources ==
- Graff, Garrett M. (February 15, 2022). Watergate: A New History. Simon and Schuster. ISBN 978-1-9821-3918-6.
- Len Colodny and Robert Gettlin, Silent Coup: The Removal of a President, New York: St. Martin's Press, 1991
- Jeb Stuart Magruder, An American Life: One Man's Road to Watergate, New York 1974, Atheneum
  - published before Magruder's sentencing on May 21, and before Nixon's resignation.
