= Ron Ziegler =

13th White House Press Secretary (1939–2003)

- Ziegler in 1972

13th White House Press Secretary
- In office January 20, 1969 – August 9, 1974
- President: Richard Nixon
- Preceded by: George Christian
- Succeeded by: Jerald terHorst

Personal details
- Born: Ronald Louis Ziegler; May 12, 1939 Covington, Kentucky, U.S.
- Died: February 10, 2003 (aged 63) Coronado, California, U.S.
- Party: Republican
- Spouse: Nancy Plessinger (m. 1961–2003)
- Children: 2 daughters
- Education: Xavier University (attended); University of Southern California (BA)

Ronald Louis Ziegler (May 12, 1939 – February 10, 2003) was the 13th White House Press Secretary who served during President Richard Nixon's administration.

== Early life ==
Ziegler was born to Louis Daniel Ziegler, a production manager, and Ruby (Parsons) in Covington, Kentucky. He was raised in the Lutheran Church–Missouri Synod denomination.

Ziegler attended Concordia Lutheran School and graduated from the eighth grade in 1953. He graduated from Dixie Heights High School in Fort Mitchell, Kentucky. He first attended college at Xavier University in Cincinnati, then transferred to the University of Southern California in 1958, graduating in 1961 with a degree in government and politics. While at USC, Ziegler was initiated into the Sigma Chi fraternity. At University of Southern California, he was a member of Trojans for Representative Government with future Watergate scandal participants Dwight L. Chapin, Tim Elbourne, Donald Segretti, Gordon C. Strachan, and Herbert Porter.

== Career ==
=== Early work ===
Ziegler served as a press aide on Nixon's unsuccessful California gubernatorial campaign in 1962. He then worked with H. R. Haldeman, who later served as Nixon's White House Chief of Staff, at the J. Walter Thompson advertising firm.

=== Nixon administration ===
In 1969, at the age of 29, Ziegler became the youngest White House Press Secretary in history, serving in the Nixon Administration. He was also the first press secretary to use the White House Press Briefing Room when it was completed in 1970. Historically, White House press secretaries had been recruited from the ranks of individuals with substantial journalistic experience, such as Stephen Early and Pierre Salinger, raising the question of whether Ziegler was qualified for his position. The hiring of Ziegler was seen by many, and later confirmed by Haldeman himself, as a cog in Nixon's plan to undermine the press; Ziegler's ability to execute the chief of staff's directions was impressive, allowing him to hold a senior position throughout the administration. Ziegler held the record for the youngest White House press secretary until 2025, when Karoline Leavitt, aged 27, became Press Secretary at the beginning of the Second presidency of Donald Trump.

Ziegler was the White House press secretary during the political scandal known as Watergate. In 1972, he dismissed the first report of the burglary at the Watergate Hotel as a "third-rate burglary attempt", and repeatedly dismissed reports by Bob Woodward and Carl Bernstein in the Washington Post, but within two years, Nixon had resigned under threat of impeachment. Ziegler apologized to The Washington Post for having been so dismissive.

At a Veterans of Foreign Wars convention on August 20, 1973, Nixon was filmed angrily pushing Ziegler toward a crowd of reporters. The president was incensed that Ziegler was not doing enough to keep members of the press away as Nixon entered the convention hall.

In 1974, Ziegler became Assistant to the President. Particularly in the period following the resignations of such senior administration officials as Bob Haldeman and John Ehrlichman, Ziegler became one of Nixon's closest aides and confidants. During the impeachment process against Nixon, he defended the president until the bitter end, urging Nixon not to resign, but rather fight conviction and removal from office in the Senate. During the unfolding political scandal, Ziegler appeared before Congress at least 33 times.

== Post-Watergate ==
Unlike many other former aides following President Nixon's resignation in 1974, Ziegler remained very close to him. Ziegler was on the plane that Nixon took to Marine Corps Air Station El Toro, near San Clemente, California, as Gerald Ford was sworn into office.

On November 12, 1999, Ziegler was scheduled to participate by telephone in a television panel discussion that included several former Nixon and Ford aides, including his successor as White House Press Secretary, Jerald terHorst, who had resigned in protest at President Ford's pardon of Nixon. However, Ziegler's feed failed to hook up for the session, which went on without him.

=== Business activities and achievements ===
In 1988, Ziegler became president and chief executive of the National Association of Chain Drug Stores, living in Alexandria, Virginia. He had previously served as president of the National Association of Truck Stop Operators. He was described by leading truck stop advocate William Fay as "a significant factor in expanding the travel plaza and truckstop industry's presence in the nation's capital." Hay further credited Ziegler as having achieved "great strides in membership recruitment and expansion of member services."

== Personal life ==
In 1961, Ziegler married Nancy Plessinger, with whom he had two children, Cindy and Laurie.

Ziegler moved to Coronado Shores in Coronado, California, where he died of a heart attack in 2003 at the age of 63.

== In popular culture ==
Ziegler appears in the 1976 film All the President's Men as himself in archival news footage. He is portrayed in the 1989 television movie The Final Days by Graham Beckel, and in the 1995 Oliver Stone film Nixon by David Paymer.

Political offices
| Preceded by George Christian | White House Press Secretary; 1969–1974 | Succeeded by Jerald terHorst |
