= Earl J. Silbert =

American lawyer (1936–2022)

Earl Silbert
- Born: Earl Judah Silbert; March 8, 1936; Boston, Massachusetts, U.S.
- Died: September 6, 2022 (aged 86); Keene, New Hampshire, U.S.
- Education: Harvard University (AB, JD)
- Known for: Federal prosecutor during Watergate scandal
- Political party: Democratic
- Spouse: Patricia Allott
- Children: 2, including Leslie

Earl Judah Silbert (March 8, 1936 – September 6, 2022) was an American lawyer who served as United States Attorney for the District of Columbia from 1974 to 1979. He was the first prosecutor in the Watergate scandal, alongside two other U.S. Attorneys.

== Early life ==
Silbert was born in Boston on March 8, 1936. His father was a lawyer and a member of the Massachusetts House of Representatives for the Republican Party; his mother was a housewife and social worker. Silbert attended Phillips Exeter Academy, graduating in 1953. He then studied history at Harvard University, graduating with a bachelor's degree in 1957, before obtaining a Juris Doctor degree three years later from Harvard Law School.

== Career ==
After graduating from law school, Silbert first worked at the United States Department of Justice (Tax Division) from 1960. His refined demeanor earned him the moniker "Earl the Pearl". He then served as principal assistant United States Attorney for the District of Columbia. It was in this capacity that he became the first prosecutor in the Watergate scandal. He collaborated with Donald E. Campbell and Seymour Glanzer in obtaining indictments of the five burglars and two leading co-conspirators (G. Gordon Liddy and E. Howard Hunt) in September 1972. Both Liddy and James W. McCord Jr. were subsequently convicted in January of the following year. Silbert later revealed that he had initially underestimated the severity of the case, believing the break-in to be too inept and imprudent to have been sanctioned by those in authority.

Following Watergate, Silbert became interim United States Attorney for the District of Columbia in January 1974, before being confirmed to the role in October 1974. He ultimately served in that capacity until 1979. He was indirectly involved in the trial of CIA asset Michael Townley for the assassination of Orlando Letelier, the former Chilean ambassador to the U.S. Silbert's involvement centered on a document he agreed to (in his capacity as U.S. Attorney for the Justice Department) with the Chilean government of dictator Augusto Pinochet to limit the amount of information the Justice Department would release about the assassination of Letelier and other activities involving the Chilean government. Silbert's April 7, 1978, agreement with Enrique Montero Marx, the Chilean under-secretary of the interior, came one day before the Chilean government turned over Townley to the FBI for questioning in the Letelier slaying.

Silbert later represented Michael Abbell, a former U.S. Justice Department prosecutor who then became a defense attorney for Colombia's notorious Cali cartel and who was eventually sentenced to five years in prison for his involvement in drug trafficking. He also represented former Enron chairman Kenneth Lay.

== Personal life ==
Silbert was married to Patricia Allott for 52 years until his death. Together, they had two daughters: Sarah and Leslie, who is a novelist.

Silbert died on September 6, 2022, at a hospital in Keene, New Hampshire. He was 86, and suffered from an aortic dissection prior to his death.

== Awards ==
In 2009, the Council for Court Excellence Justice Potter Stewart Award was presented to Silbert for his work to improve the judicial system, both as a United States Attorney and subsequently in private practice.
