= Dwight Chapin =

American politician and Watergate scandal ex-convict (born 1940)

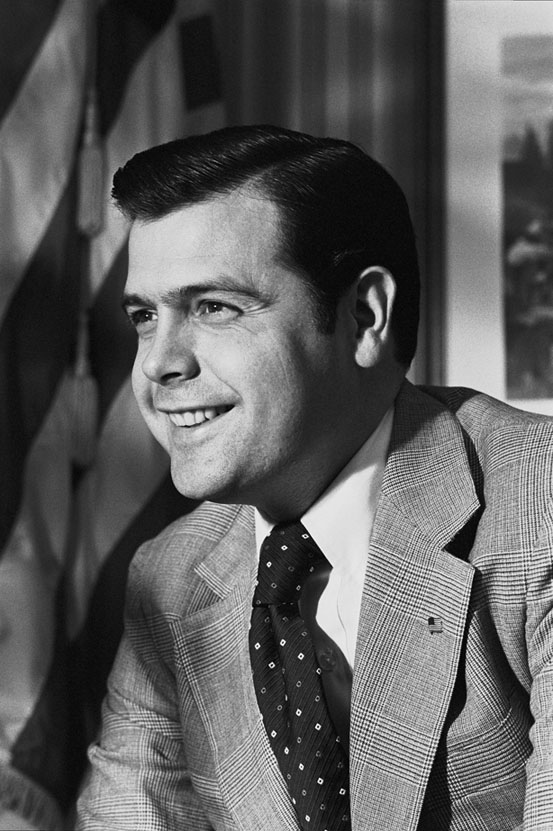

White House Appointments Secretary
- In office January 20, 1969 – March 1973
- President: Richard Nixon
- Preceded by: James R. Jones
- Succeeded by: Stephen Bull

Personal details
- Born: Dwight Lee Chapin; December 2, 1940 (age 85) Wichita, Kansas, U.S.
- Party: Republican
- Education: University of Southern California (BA)

Dwight Lee Chapin (born December 2, 1940) is an American political organizer, businessman and retired public servant. He was Deputy Assistant to President of the United States Richard Nixon during the Watergate scandal. Chapin was convicted of lying to a grand jury (perjury) during the scandal and served nine months at the Federal Correctional Institution, Lompoc.

== Early life ==
Chapin was born in Wichita, Kansas. He got his first experience in California politics in 1958 at the American Legion's Boys State summer program, where he was elected the head of the Tory Party. His counterpart, the Whig Party leader, was Stacy Keach, who went into acting as a career. Chapin graduated in 1963 from the University of Southern California, where he was a member of Sigma Chi fraternity and the Trojan Knights. At USC, he was a member of Trojans for Representative Government with future Watergate scandal participants Tim Elbourne, Donald Segretti, Gordon C. Strachan, Herbert Porter, and Ron Ziegler.

== Early political career ==
When Nixon ran for California governor in 1962, Chapin, then still at USC, was a paid Field Man (on-the-ground organizational leader for election campaigns) and worked with the volunteer organization. After the 1962 campaign, he was hired by H. R. Haldeman to work at the J. Walter Thompson Company, an advertising firm, in Los Angeles.

Chapin was part of Nixon's presidential campaign from 1967 to 1968, serving as Nixon's personal aide. Time described him as "young, athletic, religious, handsome, clean-cut, bright, ambitious, and tough."

== Nixon's White House Staff ==
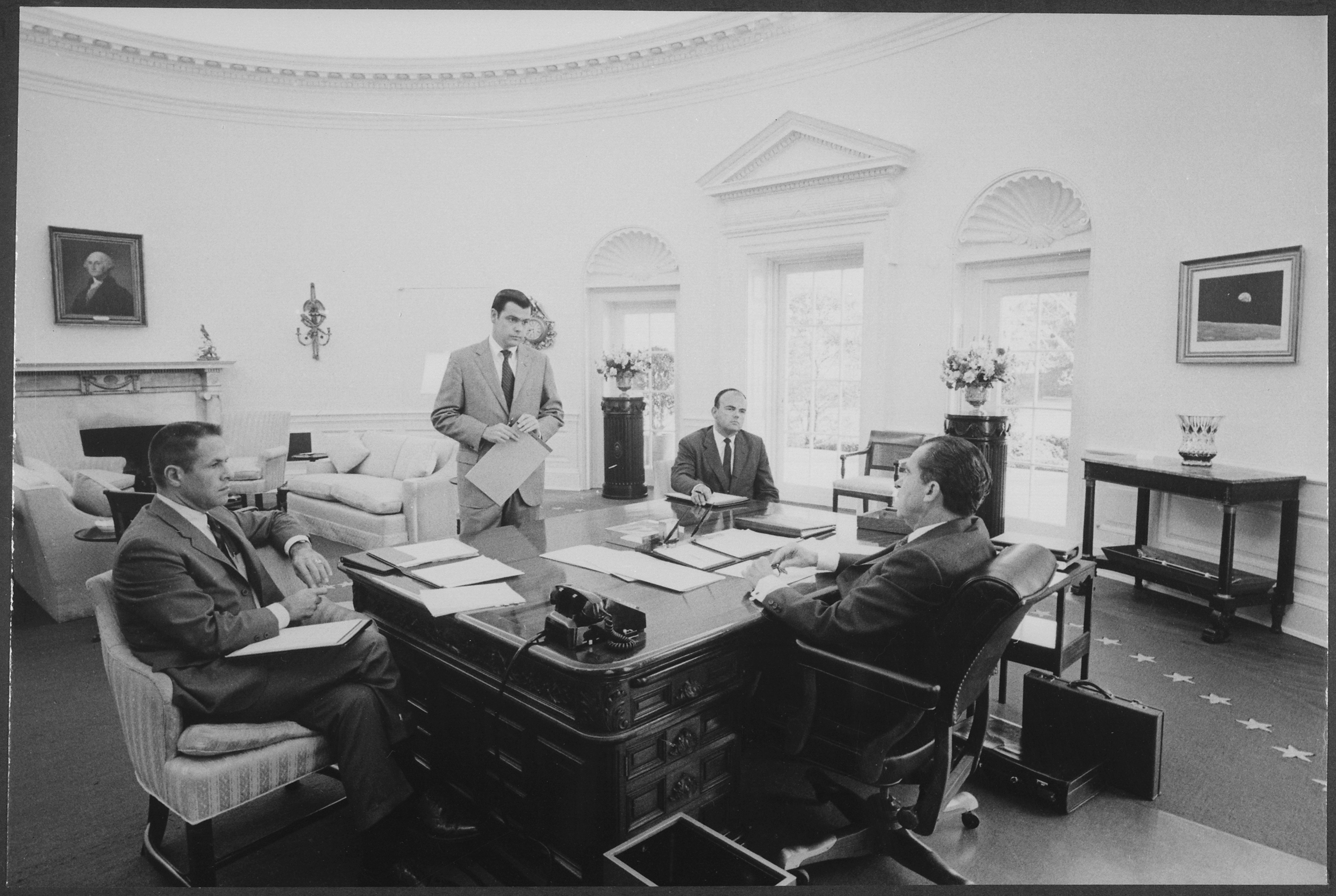
President Richard Nixon meeting with H.R. Haldeman, Dwight Chapin, John D. Ehrlichman in 1970.

He was Special Assistant to the President (1969–1971), and then Deputy Assistant (1971–1973). He was the appointments secretary, responsible for scheduling presidential activities, appointments, and travel. In addition, Chapin was in charge of the White House television office. Chapin also oversaw the hiring and the supervising of presidential advance men, and headed that group to prepare for Nixon's second overseas trip, to the People's Republic of China in February 1972, after an earlier trip to Japan in 1969. In 1973, Chapin was named one of the Ten Outstanding Young Men of the year by the United States Junior Chamber (Jaycees) for his work.

== Watergate scandal ==
It was during this time Chapin hired Donald Segretti, his former colleague from USC, to disrupt the campaigns of Democratic presidential hopefuls during the 1972 presidential primary season through acts of political "sabotage" - known as the "dirty tricks" campaign. Chapin was asked to find a "Dick Tuck" (a legendary Democratic political saboteur) type of prankster to perform the "dirty tricks" to work under H. R. Haldeman, Nixon's Chief of Staff, and the President.

Segretti later testified before a Watergate grand jury about the activities, including Chapin's supervisory role. Chapin denied any detailed knowledge of Segretti or actions that Segretti undertook during grand jury testimony. Segretti testified, "When Dwight hired me he made it clear he was hiring me because I was a lawyer and would know what was legal and what was not." Chapin was never indicted for any of Segretti's activities. Chapin resigned to work as an executive for United Airlines but was drawn back into the Watergate legal proceedings.

== Imprisonment ==
In a 1974 jury trial, Chapin was convicted of making false material declarations before a grand jury and was imprisoned in the federal corrections camp at Lompoc, California (so-called "Camp Cupcake") from August 1975 to April 1976. Despite the relatively minor repercussions he remained indignant, initially vowing to appeal "all the way to the Supreme Court" (which he did) in a very hostile political climate. It was later revealed that he was earning $1,000 per week while in prison, on the payroll of W. Clement Stone Enterprises.

== After Watergate and Nixon's resignation ==
After his release from prison, Chapin re-entered the private sector and worked at W. Clement Stone Enterprises in Chicago. From 1977 to 1984, he published a magazine called Success Unlimited. Chapin then worked for the international public relations firm Hill & Knowlton in Chicago. Later, Chapin had assignments in Geneva, Switzerland, Tokyo, Japan and Hong Kong, where he was managing director, Asia, for Hill & Knowlton.

In 1986, Chapin started Chapin Enterprises. The firm provided consulting services to many prestigious companies and associations. Chapin remained involved in politics and in 1980 worked for Ronald Reagan's election as president. In 1988, he held a position in the George H. W. Bush presidential campaign.

Chapin has maintained an active interest in politics and is now a business consultant and mentor/coach in East Hampton, New York.. In 2022, he published a memoir titled The President's Man.

Political offices
Preceded by James R. Jones	White House Appointments Secretary; 1969–1973	Succeeded by Stephen Bull
