= Herbert Porter =

Campaign aide to U.S. President Richard Nixon

Herbert L. Porter
- Born: 1938 (age 87–88)
- Occupations: Committee for the Re-Election of the President (CRP) organizer, former White House aide
- Status: Guilty
- Criminal charges: Making a false statement to an agency of the federal government
- Penalty: 30 days

Herbert L. "Bart" Porter (born 1938) is an American political operative who served as a campaign aide to Richard Nixon. He became involved in the Watergate scandal after the FBI questioned him about a money transfer he had made; Porter later testified before the Senate Watergate Committee and admitted that he had lied to the FBI during that questioning. Porter was convicted of making false statements in 1974 and served 30 days in prison.

== Early life ==
Porter was raised in California, and describes himself as having been a supporter of Richard Nixon from a young age:

I first met Mr. Nixon when I was 8 years old in 1946, when he ran for Congress in my home district [in California]. I wore Nixon buttons when was 8 and when I was 10 and when I was 12 and when I was 16. My family worked for him; my father worked for him in campaigns, my mother worked for him in campaigns.

Porter attended the University of Southern California, where he befriended future Nixon administration figures including Ron Ziegler. Ziegler invited Porter onto Nixon's staff in 1970, and six months later, Porter was named the Scheduling Director of the Committee for the Re-Election of the President.

== Watergate scandal ==
In July 1972, Porter was questioned by the FBI about money he had transferred to G. Gordon Liddy. He falsely told the agents that the money had been used to fund the infiltration of left-wing student organizations. Porter testified during the January 1973 trial of the Watergate Seven, and testified again before the Senate Watergate Committee in June 1973. In the latter testimony, he admitted to having lied about the purpose of the spending, and stated that he had done so at the direction of Jeb Stuart Magruder. Reflecting on his motivations for the lie, Porter told the committee that Nixon's administration was an insular community that placed a high value on "protect[ing] the President".

Porter pleaded guilty to the charge of lying to the FBI on January 28, 1974. He was sentenced on April 11 of the same year; his sentence was 15 months' imprisonment, but the bulk of this sentence was suspended by Judge William B. Bryant, with the result that Porter was only imprisoned for 30 days.

== Post-Watergate ==
After Porter's testimony in January 1973, he and his family left Washington and returned to the West Coast. In the immediate aftermath of the testimony, Porter had a hard time finding employment due to his connection to the Watergate scandal. In August 1973, he told the New York Times that he was considering starting a land development business in Orange County.
