= H. R. Haldeman =

American political aide and Watergate Scandal figure (1926–1993)

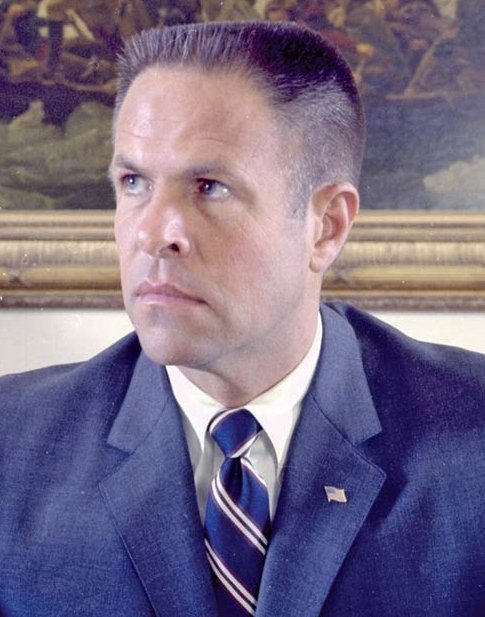
- Haldeman in 1971

4th White House Chief of Staff
- In office January 20, 1969 – April 30, 1973
- President: Richard Nixon
- Deputy: Alexander Butterfield
- Preceded by: James R. Jones (Appointments Secretary)
- Succeeded by: Alexander Haig

Personal details
- Born: Harry Robbins Haldeman; October 27, 1926 Los Angeles, California, U.S.
- Died: November 12, 1993 (aged 67) Santa Barbara, California, U.S.
- Party: Republican
- Spouse: Joanne Horton (m. 1949)
- Children: 4
- Education: University of Redlands; University of Southern California; University of California, Los Angeles (BA)

Military service
- Allegiance: United States
- Branch/service: United States Navy
- Unit: United States Naval Reserve

Harry Robbins "Bob" Haldeman (October 27, 1926 – November 12, 1993) was an American political aide and businessman, best known for his service as White House Chief of Staff to President Richard Nixon and his consequent involvement in the Watergate scandal.

Born in California, Haldeman served in the Navy Reserves in World War II and attended UCLA. In 1949, he joined the J. Walter Thompson advertising agency, where he worked for 20 years as a prominent advertising executive in both Los Angeles and New York City. He made a name for himself early in Los Angeles social circles from his work as chairman of the UCLA Alumni Association and a member of the University of California Board of Regents.

A long family association with the Republican Party and his own interest drew Haldeman to politics. In the 1950s, he became acquainted with Nixon, for whom he developed both an intense respect and steadfast loyalty. He began as an advance man on President Dwight D. Eisenhower's reelection campaign in 1956, again worked as an advance man on Nixon's 1960 presidential campaign, and managed Nixon's 1962 run for governor of California. When Nixon was elected President in 1968, he selected Haldeman as his chief of staff.

Haldeman implemented changes to White House staffing systems and Executive Branch governance and operations. Subsequent presidential administrations have continued to use the staffing system he developed. His management style resulted in a reputation for expecting specific performance standards from staff.

After he left the Nixon administration in April 1973, Haldeman was tried on charges of perjury, conspiracy, and obstruction of justice for his role in the Watergate cover-up. He was found guilty and imprisoned for 18 months. Upon Haldeman's release, he returned to private life and was a successful businessman and real estate developer until his death from cancer in 1993 at the age of 67.

== Early life ==
Haldeman was born in Los Angeles on October 27, 1926, one of three children of socially prominent parents. His father, Harry Francis Haldeman, founded and ran a successful heating and air conditioning supply company, and gave time and financial support to local Republican causes, including the Richard Nixon financial fund that led to the so-called "Fund Crisis" during the 1952 presidential race. His mother, Katherine (née Robbins), was a longtime volunteer with the Salvation Army and other philanthropic organizations. His paternal grandfather, Harry Marston Haldeman, co-founded the Better America Federation of California, The Oz Film Manufacturing Company, and a gentleman's club named The Uplifters. Young Haldeman and his siblings were raised as Christian Scientists. Known to his peers as a "straight arrow", he sported his trademark flat-top haircut from his high school years – a look that he would adopt for most of his life until after his resignation as Chief of Staff – enjoyed discussions of ethics, and achieved the rank of Life Scout. He attended Harvard School, an elite boys' prep school, during which time he met Joanne "Jo" Horton, who was attending Marlborough School, an elite, private secondary school which educated girls in the 7th to 12th grades. The two married in 1949.

During World War II he was in the United States Navy Reserve but did not see active combat. Haldeman attended the University of Redlands and the University of Southern California, then transferred to the University of California, Los Angeles (UCLA). He received his B.A. from UCLA in 1948, where he was a member of Beta Theta Pi fraternity. At UCLA, he met John Ehrlichman, who became a close friend and colleague in the Nixon administration.

== Career ==
In 1949, he joined the J. Walter Thompson advertising agency, where he worked for 20 years in both Los Angeles and New York City; other employees of this firm during this period included Ronald Ziegler, who went on to serve as White House Press Secretary in the Nixon administration.

A long family association with the Republican Party and his own interest drew Haldeman to politics and during this period he commenced working for Richard Nixon, for whom he developed both an intense respect and steadfast loyalty. Beginning as an advance man on Nixon's 1956 and 1960 campaigns, Haldeman managed Nixon's 1962 run for governor of California, and when Nixon was elected President in 1968, he chose Haldeman to be his chief of staff.

== Nixon administration ==
When Haldeman's appointment to the White House was announced, Robert Rutland, a close friend and presidential scholar, urged him to start keeping a daily diary recording the major events of each day and Haldeman's thoughts on them. Haldeman took this suggestion and started keeping and maintaining a daily diary throughout his entire career in the Nixon White House (January 18, 1969 – April 30, 1973). The full text of the diaries is almost 750,000 words, and an abridged version was published as The Haldeman Diaries after Haldeman's death. A full version is available to researchers at the Richard Nixon Presidential Library and Museum.

Gaining a reputation as a taskmaster who expected top-notch work, he and John Ehrlichman were called "the Berlin Wall" by other White House staffers in a play on their German family names and shared penchant for keeping others away from Nixon and serving as his "gatekeepers". They became Nixon's most loyal and trusted aides during his presidency. Both were keen in protecting what they regarded as Nixon's best interests. He and the president were very close – Haldeman was even dubbed "the president's son-of-a-bitch" – and Nixon relied on him to filter information that came into his office and to make sure that information was properly dispensed.

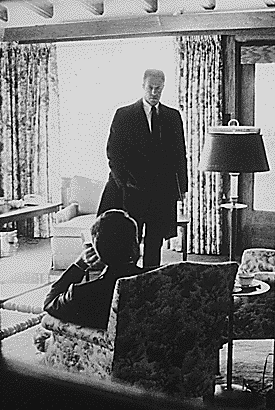
Haldeman with Nixon at the Western White House – La Casa Pacifica, November 21, 1972.

=== Role in Watergate ===
Nixon Oval Office meeting with H.R. Haldeman: the "Smoking Gun" conversation of June 23, 1972 (full transcript)

Haldeman was one of the key figures in the Watergate scandal. The "smoking gun" tape revealed that Nixon instructed Haldeman to have the CIA pressure the FBI into dropping its Watergate investigation. Nixon instructed him to tell the CIA that the investigation would "open up the whole Bay of Pigs thing again". In his book, Haldeman later wrote: "It seems that in all those references to the Bay of Pigs, he was actually referring to the Kennedy assassination." He also said that Nixon might have been reminding CIA Director Richard Helms that the CIA assassination attempts on Fidel Castro may have triggered the assassination of Kennedy.

The unexplained 18 1/2 minute gap in Nixon's Oval Office recordings occurred during a discussion that included the President and Haldeman on June 20, 1972.

Nixon requested the resignations of Haldeman and Ehrlichman in what has been described as a long and emotional meeting at Camp David. Haldeman complied, and his resignation was announced on April 30, 1973 along with those of Ehrlichman and US Attorney General Richard Kleindienst. In a telephone conversation shortly after the resignations, Nixon told Haldeman that he loved him like his brother. On the eve of Nixon's own resignation that August, Haldeman requested a full pardon for himself along with a full pardon for Vietnam War draft resisters, arguing that pardoning the latter would take some of the heat off of him. Nixon refused.

On January 1, 1975, Haldeman was convicted of conspiracy, obstruction of justice, and three counts of perjury. He was sentenced to serve 2 1/2 to 8 years, subsequently commuted to 1 to 4 years. In Lompoc Federal Prison, Haldeman worked in a facility testing sewage. On December 20, 1978, after serving 18 months, Haldeman was released on parole.

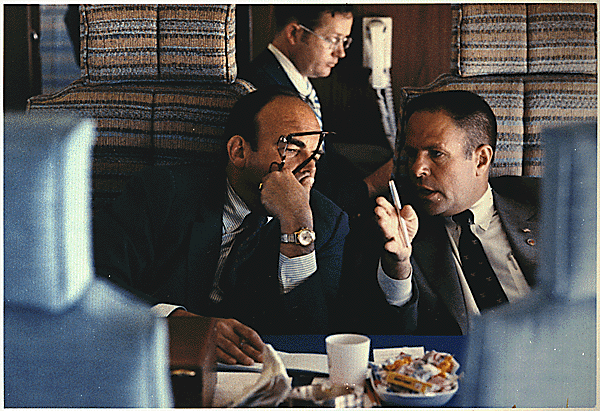
"The Berlin Wall" of Ehrlichman and Haldeman on April 27, 1973, three days before they were asked to resign.

== The Ends of Power ==
In 1978, Times Books published The Ends of Power, written by Haldeman with the writer Joseph DiMona. Haldeman wrote in the book that Nixon had initiated the break-in and had participated in the cover-up from the onset.

A passage in The Ends of Power has been claimed to support allegations linking Watergate to the assassination of John F. Kennedy.

James Woods portrayed Haldeman in Oliver Stone's 1995 film Nixon, which presents the scenario that Nixon attempted to use the CIA's hidden anti-Castro history to help cover up his own misdeeds during Watergate. Stone credited the comments attributed to Haldeman in The Ends of Power as the source for his scenario.

According to political commentator Chris Matthews, Haldeman denied writing those words and said the theory of events actually belonged to DiMona. Matthews reported that Haldeman said he had no idea of what Nixon meant by the "whole Bay of Pigs thing" comments. Noting that Stone had implicated Nixon as having a role in planning a plot to kill Castro, Howard Rosenberg described it as "one of the most controversial themes of his movie". A response by Nixon writers Steven Rivele and Christopher Wilkinson stated that DiMona, Haldeman's ghostwriter, had confirmed that it was Haldeman's conclusion that "the Bay of Pigs thing" was a code for the Kennedy assassination.

== Later life ==
In his post-prison years, Haldeman went on to have a successful career as a businessman. Haldeman and Buzz Aldrin, representing Americom International Corp in collaboration with Radisson Hotels, signed an agreement to establish the first U.S. hotel and business complex venture within the former Soviet Union in Moscow. This agreement was signed during a ceremony held in conjunction with the US-USSR Trade and Economic Council. Haldeman also worked on development and real estate, and opened eight Sizzler Steak Houses in Florida.

== Death ==
On November 12, 1993, after refusing medical treatment in accordance with his Christian Science beliefs, Haldeman died of abdominal cancer at his home in Santa Barbara, California. He was survived by his wife of almost 45 years, Joanne Horton, and their four children – Susan, Harry (Hank), Peter, and Ann.

Upon Haldeman's death, Richard Nixon said in a statement, "I have known Bob Haldeman to be a man of rare intelligence, strength, integrity and courage. He played an indispensable role in turbulent times as our Administration undertook a broad range of initiatives at home and abroad." His White House diaries were released posthumously as The Haldeman Diaries in 1994. Nixon died of a stroke a few months later on April 22, 1994.

== See also ==
- Operation Sandwedge

Political offices
Preceded by James R. Jones as White House Appointments Secretary	White House Chief of Staff; 1969–1973	Succeeded by Alexander Haig
