= Alexander Butterfield =

American military officer and government official (1926–2026)

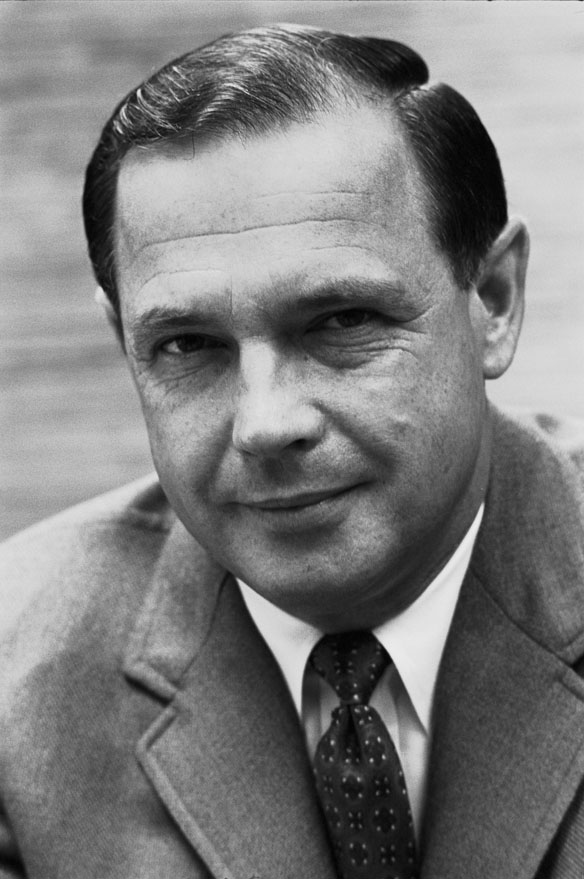
- Butterfield in 1969

5th Administrator of the Federal Aviation Administration
- In office March 14, 1973 – March 31, 1975
- President: Richard Nixon; Gerald Ford
- Preceded by: John H. Shaffer
- Succeeded by: John L. McLucas

White House Cabinet Secretary
- In office November 4, 1969 – August 9, 1974
- President: Richard Nixon
- Preceded by: John C. Whitaker
- Succeeded by: Warren S. Rustand

Personal details
- Born: Alexander Porter Butterfield; April 6, 1926 Pensacola, Florida, U.S.
- Died: March 9, 2026 (aged 99) La Jolla, California, U.S.
- Resting place: Arlington National Cemetery
- Spouse: Charlotte Maguire (m. 1949; div. 1985)
- Education: National War College (attended); University of Maryland, College Park (BS); George Washington University (MS); University of California, San Diego (MA)

Military service
- Allegiance: United States
- Branch: United States Air Force
- Service years: 1948–1969
- Rank: Colonel
- Conflict: Vietnam War
- Awards: Distinguished Flying Cross

Alexander Porter Butterfield (April 6, 1926 – March 9, 2026) was an American Air Force officer, public official and businessman. From 1969 to 1973, Butterfield served as deputy assistant to President Richard Nixon. On July 13, 1973, during the Watergate investigation, he revealed the existence of Nixon's White House taping system. Butterfield was the administrator of the Federal Aviation Administration from 1973 to 1975.

== Early life and Air Force career ==
Butterfield was born on April 6, 1926, in Pensacola, Florida, to Susan Armistead Alexander Butterfield and United States Navy pilot (later Rear Admiral) Horace B. Butterfield. He grew up in Coronado, California, and left home in 1943. Butterfield enrolled in college at the University of California, Los Angeles, where he became a friend of H. R. Haldeman and John Ehrlichman. He left the university to join the United States Air Force in 1948. (Note: Contrary to published reports, Butterfield did not serve in World War II.)

Initially, Butterfield was stationed at Las Vegas Air Force Base (later Nellis Air Force Base) as a fighter-gunnery instructor before being transferred to the 86th Fighter Wing in Munich, West Germany, in November 1951, where he was a member of the Skyblazers jet fighter acrobatic team. He later served as the operations officer of a fighter-interceptor squadron in Knoxville, Tennessee, before being promoted to commander of a fighter squadron at Kadena Air Base in Okinawa, Japan.

During the Vietnam War, Butterfield commanded a squadron of low and medium-level combat tactical air reconnaissance aircraft. He flew 98 combat missions and was awarded the Distinguished Flying Cross. In 1965 and 1966, Butterfield served as the military assistant to the special assistant to the Secretary of Defense, where he became a friend of Alexander Haig. He also gained extensive experience working at the White House, where he spent half his time. He advanced to the rank of colonel and, beginning in 1967, was serving in Australia as the F-111 project officer; representative for the commander-in-chief of the Pacific forces; and senior U.S. military representative.

During his military career, he attended the National War College, and earned a bachelor of science degree from the University of Maryland (1956) and a master of science degree from George Washington University (1967).

== White House assistant ==
=== Obtaining a position ===
In late 1968, Butterfield learned that he would be stationed in Australia for another two years, delaying any potential promotion and potentially harming his military career. The ambitious Butterfield wanted to be in "the smoke" (where the action was), and wanted to leave Australia. After coming across a newspaper article which mentioned the appointment of H. R. Haldeman as Nixon's White House Chief of Staff, Butterfield wrote to Haldeman asking for a job.

The two met in New York City about December 19, 1968, to discuss a role as a military aide, but when nothing suitable came up, Butterfield asked to take any job in the White House. General Andrew Goodpaster, former White House staff secretary in the Eisenhower administration, suggested that Haldeman have a deputy, and Haldeman offered the position to Butterfield about January 13. Butterfield retired from the Air Force a few days later, (Note: Contrary to some published reports, Butterfield himself denies that he was told to resign from the military before taking the position. He says his decision to retire was solely his own.) and his appointment as deputy assistant to the president was announced on January 23, 1969.

=== Role as deputy assistant ===
As deputy assistant to the president, Butterfield was Haldeman's chief assistant. His first few days in the White House were difficult. Butterfield did not meet the president for 13 days. When Haldeman finally introduced Butterfield to Nixon, their meeting was short and awkward. Haldeman then left for California, leaving Butterfield in charge of the White House staff for four days.

During the second meeting with Butterfield, Nixon was rude and condescending, and Butterfield nearly resigned. The following day, however, Nixon was cordial and witty, and Butterfield resolved to stay at the White House. Butterfield, who came to like Nixon immensely, nevertheless felt the president was an "ignorant boor, a bumpkin". Initially, when meeting with Nixon, Butterfield had to mimic Haldeman's mannerisms and to duplicate his managerial style. Everything Haldeman and Butterfield did was designed to make Nixon feel comfortable and relaxed, never surprised or "spooked". Haldeman told him, "If you don't do things exactly as I do, it could upset [Nixon]."

Next to Haldeman, Butterfield was the most powerful aide in the White House. He met with Nixon and Haldeman every day at 2 p.m. to plan the following day's activities. He "completely controlled" what paperwork Nixon saw and logged memos. He accompanied Haldeman on all domestic trips, co-supervised traveling White House staff with Haldeman, and ran the White House when Haldeman and Nixon went on foreign trips.

Every meeting the president attended required "talking points" for Nixon written by an appropriate staff person as well as an after-meeting summary by that person, and Butterfield oversaw the process by which both documents were completed and filed. Butterfield also oversaw all FBI investigations requested by the White House, which included routine background checks of potential employees as well as politically motivated investigations. Other than Haldeman, no one had a more intimate knowledge of Nixon's working style, the daily operations of the White House, what Nixon may have read, or whom Nixon may have met.

Butterfield was also the person who primarily managed people as they met with Nixon. This included ensuring people arrived on time, and that they did not stay too long. Butterfield also oversaw Nixon's often-distant relationship with his wife, Pat. Late in 1970, the president's aides lost confidence in Constance C. Stuart, Pat Nixon's staff director and press secretary, and Butterfield was assigned responsibility for overseeing the First Lady's events and publicity. The day after the 1972 presidential election, Pat Nixon confronted her husband over what she perceived to be Oval Office interference with her staff. Deputy assistant to the president Dwight Chapin and later Butterfield were appointed to act as liaison between the two staffs.

=== Installing the taping system ===
Butterfield also oversaw installation of the taping system which Nixon ordered for the White House. On February 10, 1971, Haldeman's assistant, Lawrence Higby, told Butterfield that Nixon wanted a voice-activated audio taping system installed in the Oval Office and on White House telephones. The goal, Nixon said, was to create a more accurate record of events.

Butterfield worked with the Secret Service to install five hidden microphones in Nixon's desk in the Oval Office, two in lamps on the mantel over the fireplace, two in the cabinet room, and on all telephone lines in the Lincoln Sitting Room and Oval Office. According to Butterfield, the system was highly secretive, its existence known only to Nixon, Haldeman, Higby, and the three or four Secret Service technical staffers who installed it. (Note: Woodward and Bernstein note that the existence of the taping system was also known to White House Press Secretary Ron Ziegler and to Stephen B. Bull, Special Assistant to the President and Appointments Secretary and Butterfield's successor.) In April 1971, Nixon ordered the taping system to be installed in his private office in the Executive Office Building.

=== Resignation ===
In March 1973, Butterfield was confirmed as administrator of the Federal Aviation Administration and resigned from his position at the White House.

== Revelation of the taping system ==
=== Speculation on its existence ===
John Dean testified in June 1973 that Nixon was deeply involved in the Watergate cover-up, and mentioned that he suspected White House conversations were taped. Staff of the United States Senate Watergate Committee, thereafter, began to routinely ask witnesses appearing before the committee if they knew of any taping system. Senate Watergate Committee staff then asked the White House for a list of dates on which the President had met with Dean.

On June 20, Special White House Counsel for Watergate J. Fred Buzhardt provided the committee's Chief Minority (Republican) Counsel, Fred Thompson, with a document intended to impugn Dean's testimony. Buzhardt's document included almost verbatim quotations from meetings Nixon had with Dean. (Note: In late April 1973, Nixon asked Haldeman to review the tapes of Nixon's meetings with John Dean on Watergate, with a view of finding any discrepancies which might undermine Dean's credibility. The morning of June 4, Nixon began reviewing these tapes and making almost verbatim notes about conversations. That evening, he met with Buzhardt. Nixon verbally recounted the notes he made, adding his interpretation or explanatory observations, as Buzhardt took notes. The President instructed Buzhardt to work the notes up into a document, and to give the document only to Thompson.) Thompson initially violated an agreement under which the majority and minority staff would share all information. When committee Majority Investigator Scott Armstrong obtained the document, he realized it indicated the existence of a taping system.

=== July 13 questioning ===
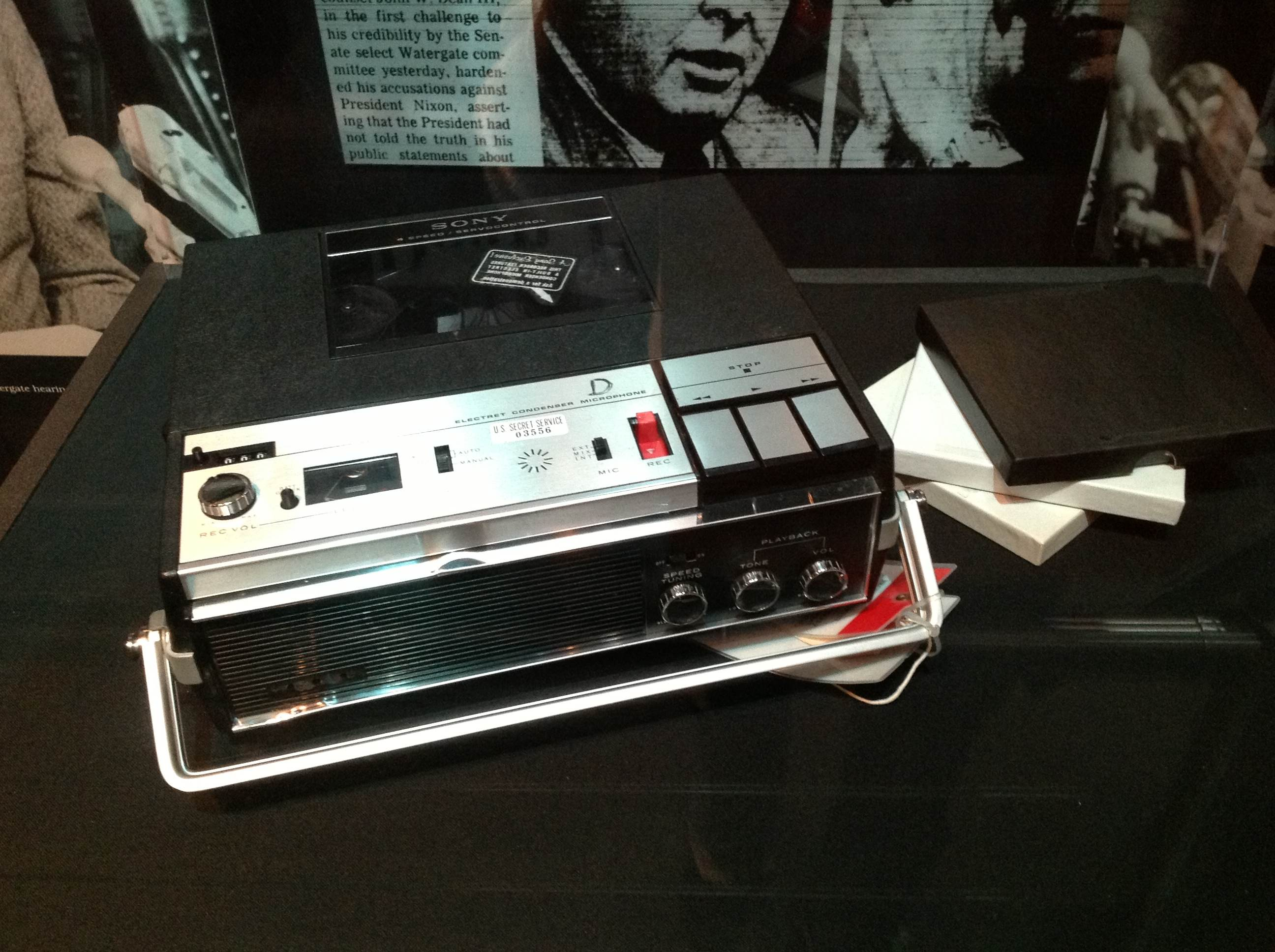
Tape recorder from President Nixon's Oval Office

Butterfield was questioned by Senate Watergate Committee staff Scott Armstrong, G. Eugene Boyce, Marianne Brazer, and Donald Sanders (deputy minority counsel) on Friday, July 13, 1973, in a background interview prior to his public testimony before the full committee. Butterfield was brought before the committee because he was Haldeman's top deputy and was the only person other than Haldeman who knew as much about the president's day-to-day behavior. (Note: Reporter Aaron Latham argues it is not clear why Butterfield was called. Bob Woodward and Carl Bernstein, he says, believe that Butterfield was called to testify because they had repeatedly suggested it to Armstrong. But Armstrong says neither the majority counsel nor minority counsel was interested. Senate Watergate Committee chief counsel Samuel Dash said that Butterfield was simply one of many Nixon aides the committee was getting around to interviewing. Assistant chief counsel James Hamilton, who authorized the interview with Butterfield, had done so because of revelations that Butterfield had handled "the 350" ($350,000 in cash held by the Nixon reelection committee). But since this issue was not considered critically important, Butterfield's interview had been put off several times.)

The critical line of questioning was conducted by Donald Sanders. Armstrong had given a copy of Buzhardt's report to Butterfield; now Sanders asked if the quotations in it might have come from notes. Butterfield said no, that the quotations were too detailed. In addition, Butterfield said that neither staff nor the president kept notes of one-on-one private meetings with Nixon. When asked where the quotations might have come from, Butterfield said he did not know. Then Sanders asked if there was any validity to John Dean's hypothesis that the White House had taped conversations in the Oval Office. Butterfield replied, "I was wondering if someone would ask that. There is tape in the Oval Office." Butterfield then told the investigators that, while he had hoped that no one would ask about the taping system, he had previously decided he would disclose its existence if asked a direct question. Butterfield then testified extensively about when the taping system was installed and how it worked, telling the staff members, "Everything was taped... as long as the President was in attendance. There was not so much as a hint that something should not be taped." Butterfield later said that he assumed the committee knew about the taping system, since they had already interviewed Haldeman and Higby.

All present recognized the significance of this disclosure, and, as former political adviser to U.S. President Gerald Ford, James M. Cannon put it, "Watergate was transformed". Butterfield's testimony lasted from 2 p.m. to 6:30 p.m. The four investigators swore themselves to secrecy and agreed to tell only the Chief Counsel and Chief Minority Counsel to the Senate Watergate Committee. Chief Counsel Samuel Dash says he immediately informed his subordinate, Deputy Chief Counsel Rufus L. Edmisten, and then Democratic Senator Sam Ervin, chairman of the committee. Both Ervin and Dash realized how important it was politically to have had a Republican uncover the taping system. That same night, Ervin asked Dash to have Butterfield testify on Monday, July 16.

=== July 16 questioning ===
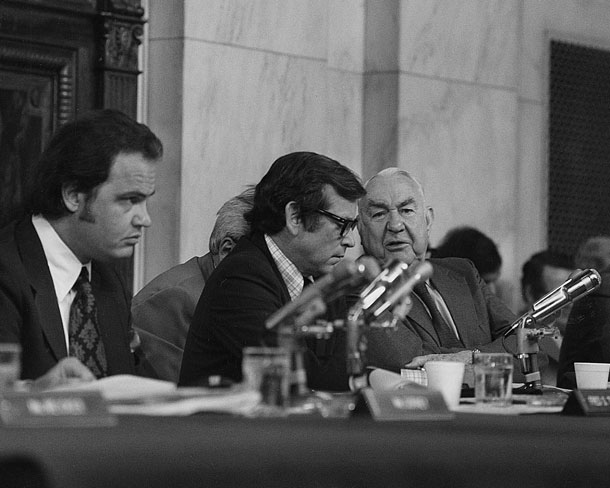
Left to right: Fred Thompson, Sen. Howard Baker, and Sen. Sam Ervin during the Senate Watergate Committee hearings

Friday night, Thompson informed Senator Howard Baker, the ranking minority member on the Senate Watergate Committee, of Butterfield's admission. After Ervin had told him the news as well, Baker began pushing to have Butterfield testify immediately. Again breaking rules not to have private conversations or meetings with the White House, Thompson also informed Buzhardt about Butterfield's Friday night interview.

Butterfield, scheduled to fly to Moscow on July 17 for a trade meeting, was worried that he would be called to testify before the Senate Watergate Committee and that this would force him to cancel his USSR trip.

Sources vary as to the next sequence of events. According to some sources, Butterfield was notified on the morning of Sunday, July 15, that he would testify the next day. Butterfield then met with Baker (whom he knew slightly). Butterfield asked Baker to use his influence to cancel the testimony, but Baker declined. Butterfield then called the White House and left a message for Special Counsel Leonard Garment (Dean's replacement), advising him of the content of his Friday testimony and the committee's subpoena for him to testify on Monday. (Note: Samuel Dash also says Butterfield contacted the White House on Sunday.) Haig and Buzhardt (Note: Fred Emery says it was Haig and Ziegler.) received Butterfield's message, and waited for Garment to return from a cross-country trip later that day. After Garment was informed, the White House staff did nothing. Butterfield was not contacted, and Nixon was not told about Butterfield's testimony until either Monday morning or late Monday afternoon. According to Butterfield and other sources, Butterfield left a message about his Friday interview for Garment at the White House on Saturday night. He then met with Baker Sunday morning, but Baker told him the chances were slim that he would be called to testify. According to Butterfield, he did not learn that he was going to testify before the Ervin committee until shortly after 10 a.m. on Monday, July 16, just about three hours before he was due to appear at 2 p.m.

Butterfield's July 16 testimony, which lasted just 30 minutes, was carried on live television by all the major broadcast networks. Senator Baker informed Dash before the hearing began that, since a Republican (Sanders) had elicited the testimony from Butterfield on July 13, he wanted Republican Chief Minority Counsel Thompson to question Butterfield during the hearing. Baker did not want the Republicans to look as if they had been caught by surprise. The New York Times called Butterfield's testimony "dramatic", and historian William Doyle has noted that it "electrified Washington and triggered a constitutional crisis". Political scientist Keith W. Olson said Butterfield's testimony "fundamentally altered the entire Watergate investigation."

Within hours of Butterfield's testimony, Alexander Haig had the taping system removed.

== Post-Watergate ==
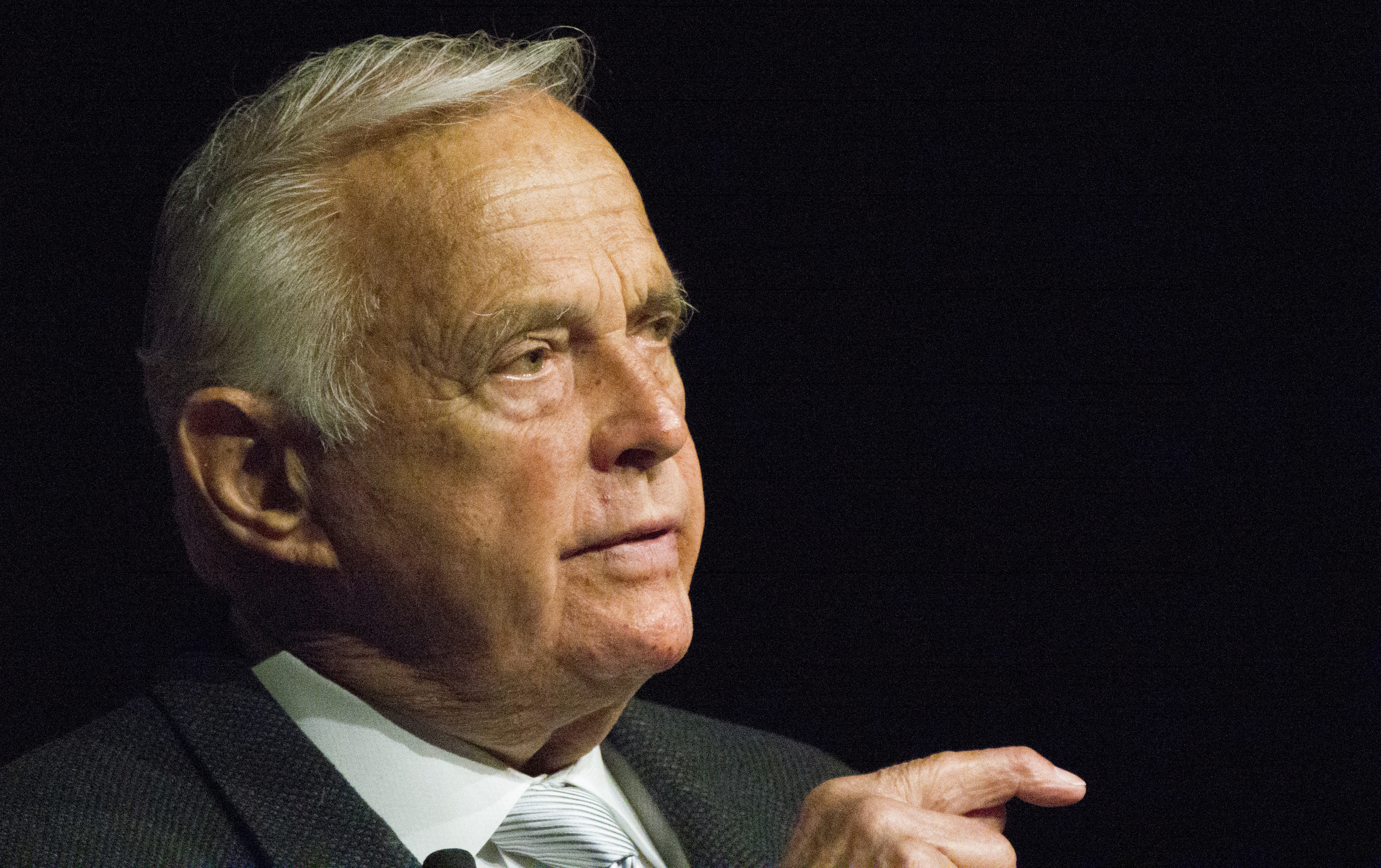
Butterfield at the Lyndon B. Johnson Presidential Library in 2016

=== Watergate revelations ===
Butterfield was not involved in the Watergate cover-up and was never charged with any crime.

Butterfield did, however, play a minor role in Watergate. Nixon had $1.6 million in campaign funds left over from the 1968 election. Determined to raise as much re-election money as he could before a new federal campaign finance law took effect on April 7, 1972, Nixon's staff and political operatives began raising large amounts of cash. Some of this cash was used for illegal purposes connected with the Watergate scandal, such as surveillance and paying for the Watergate burglary. Haldeman retained $350,000 in cash in a locked briefcase in the office of Hugh W. Sloan Jr. at the Committee for the Re-Election of the President. Haldeman said the case, colloquially known as "the 350", was for polling operations. Haldeman aide Gordon C. Strachan moved the cash to the White House in April 1972, but Haldeman ordered it removed. Strachan then asked Butterfield to handle the cash by giving it to someone Butterfield trusted. On April 7, Butterfield removed the cash and met a close friend at the Key Bridge Marriott in Rosslyn, Virginia. The friend agreed to keep the cash in a safe deposit box in Arlington County, Virginia, and make it available to the White House on demand. Butterfield voluntarily revealed his role in "the 350" to United States Attorneys shortly after leaving the White House in March 1973. (Note: Butterfield handled the money twice more. On April 21, 1972, he was told by Strachan to have $22,000 of the money delivered to Joseph Baroody, leader of the National Association of Arab Americans and a member of the Baroody family (which were very influential in conservative political circles). Butterfield contacted his friend, who delivered the money the next day. On November 28, 1972, Butterfield was instructed to obtain the money from his friend and turn it over to Strachan. This was the last transaction Butterfield was involved in.)

Butterfield also played a very limited role in some of the surveillance conducted by the Nixon White House. On September 7, 1972, Nixon met with Haldeman and Ehrlichman to discuss Senator Edward M. Kennedy's request for Secret Service protection while he campaigned on behalf of the Democratic presidential nominee, Senator George McGovern. Haldeman suggested Butterfield handle the details, and Butterfield, Ehrlichman, and Haldeman met with Nixon later that day to discuss planting a mole. Nixon was convinced Kennedy was an adulterer, and wanted to catch him "in the sack with one of his babes". Butterfield assigned former Nixon bodyguard Robert Newbrand as the spy in Kennedy's protective detail on September 8.

=== Federal Aviation Administration ===
By late 1972, Butterfield felt his job no longer challenged him, and he informally told President Nixon that he wanted to leave. Nixon offered him a position in the State Department, but Butterfield was not interested in it. Nixon then suggested the Federal Aviation Administration, and Butterfield agreed.

On December 19, 1972, President Nixon nominated Butterfield to be the new Administrator of the Federal Aviation Administration. Federal law, however, required that the Administrator be a civilian, not an active-duty or retired military officer. President Nixon sought legislation to waive this requirement for Butterfield, but it was not forthcoming. Subsequently, in February 1973 Butterfield resigned from the Air Force Reserves, giving up a $10,000 a year pension. President Nixon withdrew Butterfield's nomination on February 26, 1973, and resubmitted it to the Senate the same day. Butterfield was confirmed on March 12, 1973, and he resigned as Deputy Assistant to the President on March 14.

United States Secretary of Transportation Claude Brinegar often criticized Butterfield for being lax on aviation safety, allegations Butterfield strongly denied. In early January 1975, President Gerald Ford asked for the resignation of all executive branch officeholders who had been prominent in the Nixon administration. The Washington Post, quoting anonymous White House sources, said Butterfield's dismissal was not retaliation for his role in revealing the White House taping system, and allowed Butterfield to make a case for keeping his job with new White House Chief of Staff Donald Rumsfeld.

Butterfield did not retain his position, although the White House allowed him to take several months before resigning. Butterfield resigned on March 25, 1975, and left the government on March 31, 1975.

=== Post-government career ===
Butterfield struggled for two years to find employment after leaving the federal government. He eventually worked for a flight service company in San Francisco, California. He then found work with a financial holding company in Los Angeles. Butterfield left the financial industry to start a business and productivity consulting firm, Armistead & Alexander. He retired in 1995.

Butterfield was among those who correctly guessed the identity of Watergate informant "Deep Throat" prior to the disclosure in 2005. He told the Hartford Courant in 1995, "I think it was a guy named Mark Felt."

External videos
- Presentation by Bob Woodward on The Last of the President's Men, October 23, 2015, C-SPAN

Butterfield was a major source for Bob Woodward's 2015 book The Last of the President's Men. Butterfield retained an extensive number of records when he left the White House, some of them historically important, including the "zilch" memo, which helped form part of the basis for the book.

On July 11, 2022, Butterfield was a guest on Lawrence O'Donnell's MSNBC show, The Last Word.

Cassidy Hutchinson, former aide in the Trump administration, testified to the January 6 Committee that she drew on Butterfield's experience and example when deciding to go back to the Committee to testify fully and truthfully, despite significant legal and political pressure from Trump world. Butterfield said that Cassidy Hutchinson would be an inspiration to other young people, and asked Hutchinson to promise to help out someone if they would be in a similar situation in the future.

== Personal life and death ==
Butterfield married Charlotte Maguire in 1949. They divorced in 1985.

He moved to La Jolla, California, in 1992, where he was a close friend of (and sometimes dated) Audrey Geisel, the widow of children's book author Theodor "Dr. Seuss" Geisel. He returned to school, obtaining a master's degree in history from the University of California, San Diego. As of November 2015, he was working on a Ph.D. in history, with a focus on the presidential power to pardon. He remained active on the boards of directors of several corporations until his death.

Butterfield died at his home in La Jolla on March 9, 2026, at the age of 99.

== Bibliography ==
- Alexander Butterfield Interview Transcription. Document 2008-06-12-BUT (PDF) (Report). Nixon Presidential Library and Museum. June 12, 2008. Archived from the original (PDF) on July 29, 2016.
- Beasley, Maurine Hoffman (2005). First Ladies and the Press: The Unfinished Partnership of the Media Age. Evanston, Ill.: Northwestern University Press. ISBN 978-0-8101-2312-0.
- Brinkley, Douglas; Nichter, Luke (2014). The Nixon Tapes: 1971–1972. Boston: Houghton Mifflin Harcourt. ISBN 978-0-544-27415-0.
- Butterfield, Alexander (1974). "Testimony of Alexander Porter Butterfield". Testimony of Witnesses: Alexander Butterfield, Paul O'Brien, and Fred C. LaRue. Book I. U.S. House of Representatives. 93d Cong., 2d sess. Washington, D.C.: U.S. Government Printing Office. hdl:2027/uiug.30112104083214.
- Cannon, James M. (2013). Gerald R. Ford: An Honorable Life. Ann Arbor, Mich.: University of Michigan Press. ISBN 978-0-472-11604-1.
- Dash, Samuel (1976). Chief Counsel: Inside the Erwin Committee: The Untold Story of Watergate. New York: Random House.
- Dean, John W. (2015). The Nixon Defense: What He Knew and When He Knew It. New York: Penguin Books. ISBN 978-0-14-312738-3.
- Doyle, William (1999). Inside the Oval Office: The White House Tapes from FDR to Clinton. New York: Kodansha International. ISBN 978-1-56836-285-4.
- Emery, Fred (1995). Watergate: The Corruption of American Politics and the Fall of Richard Nixon. New York: Simon & Schuster. ISBN 978-0-684-81323-3.
- Fulsom, Don (2012). Nixon's Darkest Secrets: The Inside Story of America's Most Troubled President. New York: Thomas Dunne Books. ISBN 978-0-312-66296-7.
- Hall, Mitchell K. (2008). Historical Dictionary of the Nixon–Ford Era. Lanham, Md.: Scarecrow Press. ISBN 978-0-8108-6410-8.
- The International Who's Who, 1997–98. London: Europa Publications. 1997. ISBN 978-1-85743-022-6.
- Kraus, Theresa L. (2008). The Federal Aviation Administration: A Historical Perspective, 1903–2008. Washington, D.C.: Aviation Administration.
- Kutler, Stanley I. (1992). The Wars of Watergate: The Last Crisis of Richard Nixon. New York: W.W. Norton. ISBN 978-0-393-30827-3.
- Kutler, Stanley I. (1997). Abuse of Power: The New Nixon Tapes. New York: Simon and Schuster. ISBN 978-0-684-85187-7.
- Latham, Aaron (June 17, 1974). "There Is Tape in the Oval Office". New York. pp. 44–46, 60, 63.
- Locker, Ray (2016). Nixon's Gamble: How a President's Own Secret Government Destroyed His Administration. Guilford, Conn.: Lyons Press. ISBN 978-1-4930-0931-2.
- Olson, Keith (2014). "A President Resigns: The Watergate Scandal". In Angerholzer, Maxmillian (ed.). Triumphs and Tragedies of the Modern Congress: Case Studies in Legislative Leadership. Santa Barbara, Calif.: Praeger. ISBN 978-1-4408-3199-7.
- Swift, Will (2014). Pat and Dick: The Nixons, an Intimate Portrait of a Marriage. New York: Threshold Editions. ISBN 978-1-4516-7694-5.
- Troy, Gil (2000). Mr. and Mrs. President: From the Trumans to the Clintons. Lawrence, Kan.: University Press of Kansas. ISBN 978-0-7006-1034-1.
- Woodward, Bob; Bernstein, Carl (1976). The Final Days. New York: Simon & Schuster. ISBN 978-0-671-22298-7.
- Woodward, Bob (2015). The Last of the President's Men. New York: Simon & Schuster. ISBN 978-1-5011-1644-5.

Political offices
Preceded by John C. Whitaker	White House Cabinet Secretary; 1969–1974	Succeeded by Warren S. Rustand
Preceded by John H. Schaffer	Administrator of the Federal Aviation Administration; 1973–1975	Succeeded by John L. McLucas
