= Nixon White House tapes =

1971–73 recordings by President Nixon

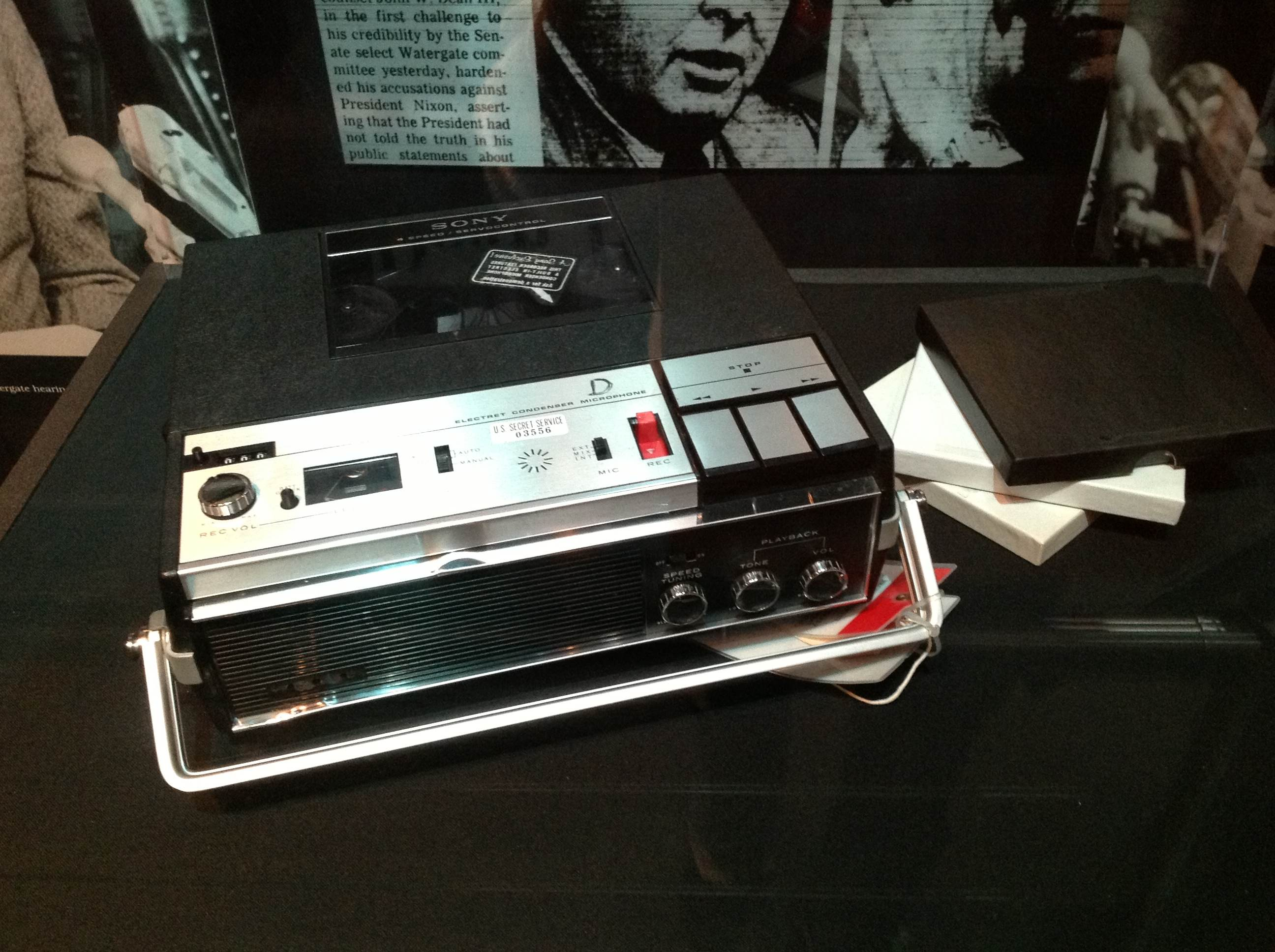
Richard Nixon's Oval Office tape recorder

Audio recordings of conversations between U.S. president Richard Nixon and Nixon administration officials, Nixon family members, and White House staff surfaced during the Watergate scandal in 1973 and 1974, leading to Nixon's resignation.

In February 1971, a sound-activated taping system was installed in the Oval Office, including in Nixon's Wilson desk, using Sony TC-800B open-reel tape recorders to capture audio transmitted by telephone taps and concealed microphones. The system was expanded to include other rooms within the White House and Camp David. The system was turned off on July 18, 1973, two days after it became public knowledge as a result of the U.S. Senate Watergate Committee hearings. Nixon was not the first president to record his White House conversations; some taping was done by every president from Franklin D. Roosevelt through Nixon, starting in 1940.

The system was mentioned during the televised testimony of White House aide Alexander Butterfield before the U.S. Senate Watergate Committee in 1973. Nixon's refusal to comply with a subpoena for the tapes was the basis for an article of impeachment against him, and led to his resignation on August 9, 1974.

On August 19, 2013, the Nixon Library and the National Archives and Records Administration released the final 340 hours of the tapes that cover the period from April 9 through July 12, 1973.

== History of the Nixon White House taping system ==
Just before assuming office in January 1969, Nixon learned that his predecessor, Lyndon B. Johnson, had installed a system to record his meetings and telephone calls. According to his Chief of Staff H. R. Haldeman, Nixon ordered the system removed, but during the first two years of his presidency, he concluded (after trying other means) that audio recordings were the only way to ensure a full and faithful account of conversations and decisions. At Nixon's request, Haldeman and his staff — including Deputy Assistant Alexander Butterfield — worked with the United States Secret Service to re-install a recording system.

On February 16, 1971, a taping system was installed in two rooms in the White House, the Oval Office and the Cabinet Room. Three months later, microphones were added to Nixon's private office in the Old Executive Office Building and the following year microphones were installed in the presidential lodge at Camp David. The system was installed and monitored by the Secret Service, and the tapes were stored in a room in the White House basement. Significant phone lines were tapped as well, including those in the Oval Office, Old Executive Office Building, and the Lincoln Sitting Room, which was Nixon's favorite room in the White House. Telephone conversations were recorded by tapping the telephone lines from the White House switchboard and relaying the conversations to recorders in a closet in the basement of the residence. All audio equipment was sound-activated, except in the Cabinet Room. All locations in the White House were activated by the Executive Protective Service's "First Family Locator" system: when an officer notified the system that the president was in the Oval Office, the taping machinery switched on, ready to record when triggered by sound.

By design, only very few individuals (apart from Nixon and Haldeman) knew of the existence of the taping system: Butterfield, Haldeman's assistant Lawrence Higby, and the Secret Service technicians who had installed it. The recordings were produced on as many as nine Sony TC-800B machines using very thin 0.5 mil (12.7 μm) tape at the slow speed of 15/16 inch (24 mm) per second.

The tapes contain about 3,700 hours of conversation. Hundreds of hours are of discussions on foreign policy, including planning for the 1972 visit to China and subsequent visit to the Soviet Union. Only 200 of the 3,500 hours contain references to Watergate and less than 5% of the recorded material has been transcribed or published.

== Revelation of the taping system ==
The existence of the White House taping system was first confirmed by Senate Committee staff member Donald Sanders, on July 13, 1973, in an interview with White House aide Alexander Butterfield. Three days later, it was made public during the televised testimony of Butterfield, when he was asked about the possibility of a White House taping system by Senate Counsel Fred Thompson.

On July 16, 1973, Butterfield told the committee in a televised hearing that Nixon had ordered a taping system installed in the White House to automatically record all conversations. Special Counsel Archibald Cox, a former United States Solicitor General under President John F. Kennedy, asked District Court Judge John Sirica to subpoena nine relevant tapes to confirm the testimony of White House Counsel John Dean.

=== Saturday Night Massacre ===
Nixon initially refused to release the tapes, putting two reasons forward: first, that the Constitutional principle of executive privilege extends to the tapes and citing the separation of powers and checks and balances within the Constitution, and second, claiming they were vital to national security. On October 19, 1973, he offered a compromise; Nixon proposed that Democratic U.S. Senator John C. Stennis review and summarize the tapes for accuracy and report his findings to the special prosecutor's office. Cox refused the compromise and on Saturday, October 20, 1973, Nixon ordered Attorney General Elliot Richardson to fire Cox. Richardson refused and resigned instead, then Deputy Attorney General William Ruckelshaus was asked to fire Cox but also refused and resigned. Solicitor General and acting head of the Justice Department Robert Bork fired Cox. Nixon appointed Leon Jaworski special counsel on November 1, 1973.

=== 18½-minute gap ===
According to Nixon's secretary Rose Mary Woods, on September 29, 1973, she was reviewing a tape of the June 20, 1972, recordings, when she made "a terrible mistake" during transcription. While playing the tape on a Uher 5000, later labeled Exhibit 60, she answered a phone call. Reaching for the Uher 5000 stop button, she said that she mistakenly hit the button next to it, the record button. For the duration of the phone call, about five minutes, she kept her foot on the device's pedal, causing a five-minute portion of the tape to be rerecorded. When she listened to the tape, the gap had grown to 18 1/2 minutes. She later insisted that she was not responsible for the remaining 13 minutes of buzz.

The contents missing from the recording remain unknown, though the gap occurs during a conversation between Nixon and Haldeman three days after the Watergate break-in. Nixon claimed not to know the topics discussed during the gap. Haldeman's notes from the meeting show that among the topics of discussion were the arrests at the Watergate Hotel. White House lawyers first heard of the gap on the evening of November 14, 1973, and Judge Sirica, who had issued subpoenas for the tapes, was not told until November 21, after the president's attorneys had decided that there was "no innocent explanation" they could offer.

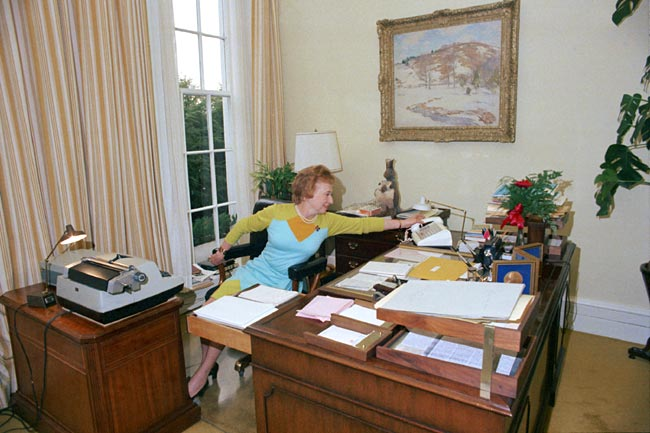
Rose Mary Woods demonstrating how she may have inadvertently created the gap

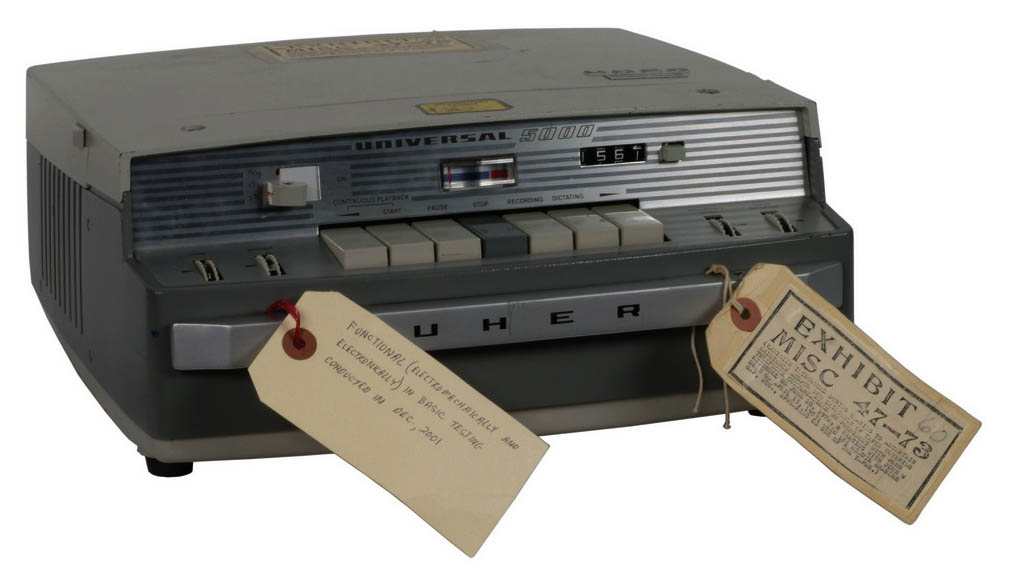
Exhibit 60, Uher 5000 with evidence tags, operated by White House secretary Rose Mary Wood

Woods was asked to demonstrate the position in which she was sitting when the accident occurred. Seated at a desk, she reached far back over her left shoulder for a telephone as her foot applied pressure to the pedal controlling the transcription machine. Her posture during the demonstration, dubbed the "Rose Mary Stretch", caused many political commentators to question the validity of the explanation.

In a grand jury interview in 1975, Nixon said that he initially believed that only four minutes of the tape were missing. He said that when he later heard that 18 minutes were missing, "I practically blew my stack."

In his 2014 book The Nixon Defense, Nixon's White House Counsel John Dean suggests that the full collection of recordings now available "largely answer the questions regarding what was known by the White House about the reasons for the break-in and bugging at the Democratic National Committee headquarters, as well as what was erased during the infamous 18 minute and 30 second gap during the June 20, 1972, conversation and why."

A variety of suggestions have been made as to who could have erased the tape. Years later, White House Chief of Staff Alexander Haig speculated that the erasures may conceivably have been caused by Nixon himself. According to Haig, the president was "spectacularly inept" at understanding and operating mechanical devices, and in the course of reviewing the tape in question, he may have caused the erasures by fumbling with the recorder's controls, though Haig could not say whether the erasures had occurred inadvertently or intentionally. In 1973, Haig had speculated aloud that the erasure was caused by an unidentified "sinister force." Others have suggested that Haig was involved in deliberately erasing the tapes with Nixon's involvement, or that the erasure was conducted by a White House lawyer.

==== Investigations ====
Nixon himself launched the first investigation into how the tapes were erased. He claimed that it was an intensive investigation but came up empty.

On November 21, 1973, Sirica appointed a panel of persons nominated jointly by the White House and the Special Prosecution Force. The panel was supplied with the evidence tape, the seven tape recorders from the Oval Office and Executive Office Building, and the two Uher 5000 recorders. One recorder, labeled as Exhibit 60, was marked "Secret Service", and the other, Exhibit 60B, was accompanied by a foot pedal. The panel determined that the buzz was of no consequence and that the gap was the result of an erasure performed on the Exhibit 60 recorder. The panel also determined that the recording consisted of at least five separate segments, possibly as many as nine, and that at least five segments required hand operation; that is, they could not have been performed using the foot pedal. The panel was subsequently asked by the court to consider alternative explanations that had emerged during the hearings. The final report, dated May 31, 1974, found that these other explanations did not contradict the original findings.

The National Archives and Records Administration owns the tape and has tried several times to recover the missing minutes, most recently in 2003, but without success. The tapes are now preserved in a climate-controlled vault in case future technology allows for restoration of the missing audio. Corporate security expert Phil Mellinger undertook a project to restore Haldeman's handwritten notes describing the missing 18 1/2 minutes, but that effort also failed to produce any new information.

=== "Smoking Gun" tape ===
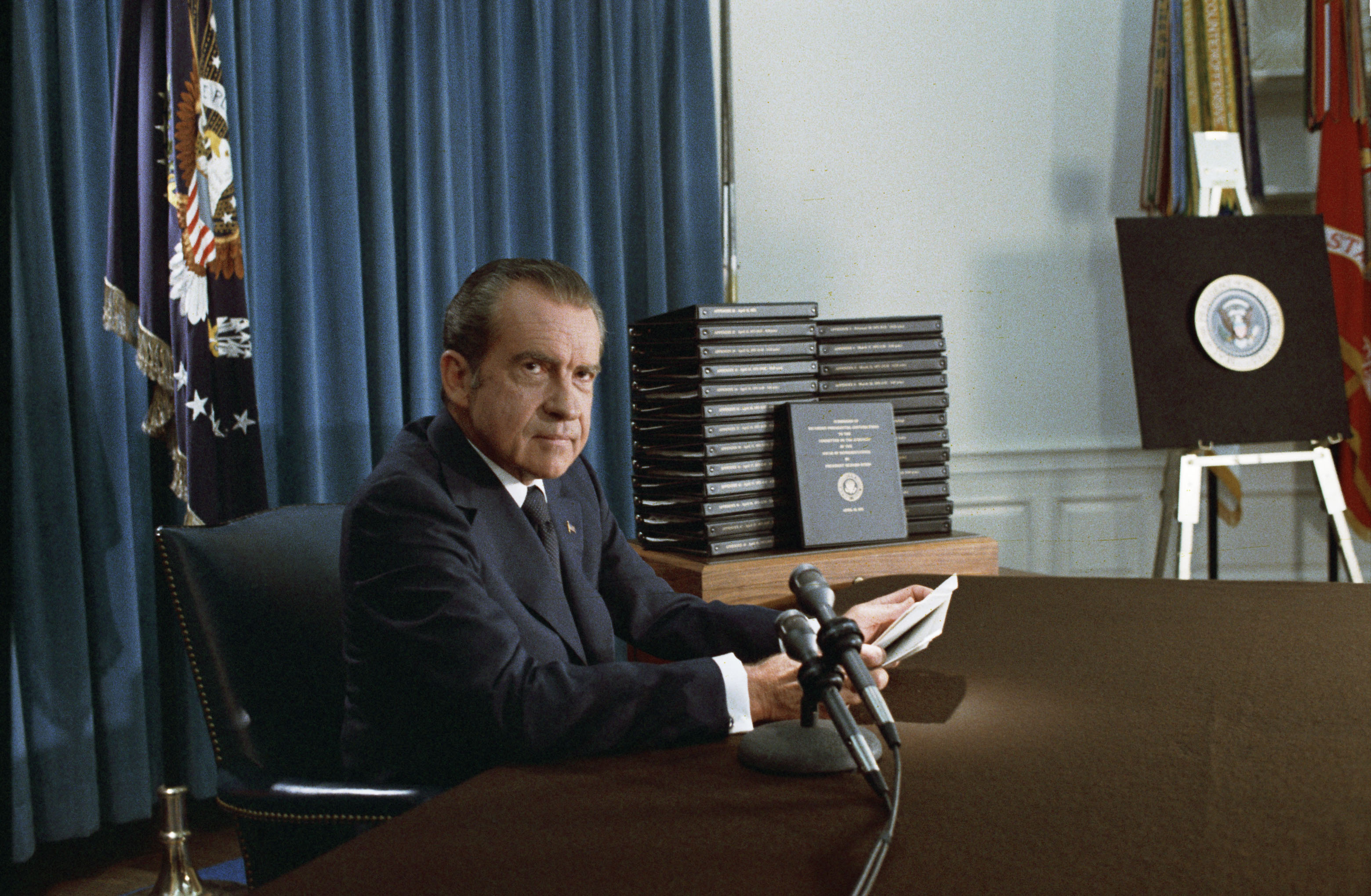
Nixon releasing the transcripts

On April 11, 1974, the U.S. House Committee on the Judiciary subpoenaed the tapes of 42 White House conversations. Later that month, Nixon released more than 1,200 pages of edited transcripts of the subpoenaed tapes, but refused to surrender the actual tapes, claiming executive privilege once more. The Judiciary Committee rejected Nixon's edited transcripts, saying that they did not comply with the subpoena.

Sirica, acting on a request from Jaworski, issued a subpoena for the tapes of 64 presidential conversations to use as evidence in the criminal cases against indicted former Nixon administration officials. Nixon refused, and Jaworski appealed to the U.S. Supreme Court to force Nixon to turn over the tapes. On July 24, 1974, the Supreme Court ordered Nixon to release the tapes. The 8–0 ruling (Justice William Rehnquist recused himself because he had worked for Attorney General John N. Mitchell) in United States v. Nixon found that President Nixon was incorrect in arguing that courts are compelled to honor, without question, any presidential claim of executive privilege.

Nixon Oval Office meeting with H.R. Haldeman (the "Smoking Gun" conversation), June 23, 1972 (full transcript – via nixonlibrary.gov)

The White House released the subpoenaed tapes on August 5. One tape, later known as the "Smoking Gun" tape, documented the initial stages of the Watergate cover-up. On it, Nixon and Haldeman are heard formulating a plan to block investigations by having the CIA falsely claim to the FBI that national security was involved. This demonstrated both that Nixon had been told of the White House connection to the Watergate burglaries soon after they took place, and that he had approved plans to thwart the investigation. In a statement accompanying the release of the tape, Nixon accepted blame for misleading the country about when he had been told of White House involvement, stating that he had a lapse of memory.

Once the "Smoking Gun" transcript was made public, Nixon's political support practically vanished. The ten Republicans on the House Judiciary Committee who had voted against impeachment in committee stated that they would now vote for impeachment once the matter reached the House floor. As a measure of how rapidly Nixon's support in Congress had evaporated, Senators Barry Goldwater and Hugh Scott estimated that no more than 15 senators were willing to even consider acquittal; Nixon would have been removed from office if fewer than 34 Senators voted not guilty. It was now clear that Nixon faced certain impeachment in the House of Representatives, and equally certain conviction and removal in the Senate. Realizing his position was untenable, Nixon resigned on the evening of Thursday, August 8, 1974, effective as of noon the next day.

== Post-presidency ==
After Nixon's resignation, the federal government took control of all of his presidential records, including the tapes, under the Presidential Recordings and Materials Preservation Act of 1974. From the time that the federal government seized his records until his death, Nixon was locked in frequent legal battles over control of the tapes. He argued that the 1974 act was unconstitutional because it violated the constitutional principles of separation of powers and executive privilege and infringed on his personal privacy rights and the First Amendment right of association.

The legal disputes would continue for 25 years, past Nixon's death in 1994. He initially lost several cases, but the courts ruled in 1998 that some 820 hours and 42 million pages of documents were his personal private property and hence should be returned to his estate.

On July 11, 2007, the National Archives was granted official control of the previously privately operated Richard Nixon Library and Museum in Yorba Linda, California. The facility now houses the tapes and periodically releases additional tapes to the public that are available online and in the public domain.
