= James Hamilton (attorney) =

- Born: 1938 (age 87–88); Chester, South Carolina
- Education: Yale University
- Occupation: Attorney
- Known for: Serving on the United States Senate Watergate Committee
- Notable work: The Power to Probe (1976), Advocate (2022)
- Spouse: Siri Kristina Hagglund

James Hamilton (born 1938) is a former attorney who came to prominence for his role in the United States Senate Watergate Committee.

== Biography ==
=== Early life and education ===
Hamilton was born in Chester, South Carolina in 1938. His father Herman Prioleau Hamilton was president of Hamilton & Company of Chester, an investment bank that sold municipal bonds. During his childhood, he often spent summers in Montreat, North Carolina. He attended Davidson College before earning a law degree from Yale University in 1969. He then served in the United States Army, where he was an Army investigator. He spent two years in Germany and also served in Micronesia, investigating possible election fraud in Palau. He earned a masters of letters from the London School of Economics.

=== Career in Washington ===
Hamilton began his legal career working at Covington & Burling in Washington, D.C.. He was part of the United States Senate Watergate Committee in 1973, serving as the committee's assistant chief counsel, under Samuel Dash. He subsequently served on several other committees, including the United States House Committee on Energy and Commerce, the United States House Committee on Oversight and Accountability and a congressional subcommittee investigating the Ronald Reagan 1980 presidential campaign.

In 1976, he published The Power to Probe: A Study of Congressional Investigations through Random House. The book was described as "the definitive history of congressional investigations" in 2022.

In 1977, he was appointed administrator of the Law Enforcement Assistance Administration. He married Siri Kristina Hagglund in July 1979, a Swedish academic who taught at George Washington University while studying for her PhD in applied linguistics. At this time, he was also a partner at Ginsburg, Feldman & Bress.

Hamilton previously served on the President's Intelligence Advisory Board and has served on the board of the United Service Organizations since 2011.

Hamilton represented several politicians as an attorney, including Herman Talmadge and Otto Passman. He represented Marina Oswald Porter, wife of Lee Harvey Oswald, during the United States House Select Committee on Assassinations. He spoke at the judiciary hearing regarding the Bill Clinton sexual assault and misconduct allegations in 1998.

During the 2000s, he vetted vice presidential candidates for presidential campaigns including the Al Gore 2000 campaign, the John Kerry 2004 campaign, the Barack Obama 2008 campaign and the Hillary Clinton 2016 campaign. In 2013, he represented Michael Mullen during the Investigations into the 2012 Benghazi attack. He was also a partner at Morgan, Lewis & Bockius.

In 2022, he published Advocate: On History's Front Lines from Watergate to the Keating Five, Clinton Impeachment, and Benghazi through University Press of Kansas. The memoir, which covers his life and career in Washington, D.C., was well received by critics.
