= Donald Sanders =

American lawyer (1930–1999)

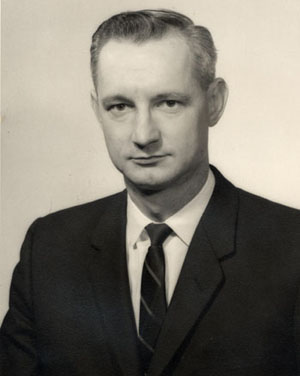
- Sandersin c. 1959

Deputy Minority Counsel for Senate Select Committee on Presidential Campaign Activities (Watergate) Committee
- In office March 1973 – September 1974

Personal details
- Born: Donald Gilbert Sanders; April 26, 1930 St. Louis, Missouri, U.S.
- Died: September 26, 1999 (aged 69) Columbia, Missouri, U.S.
- Spouse: Dolores Henderson (m. 1952)

Donald Gilbert Sanders (April 26, 1930 – September 26, 1999) was an American lawyer and a key figure in the Watergate investigation. As deputy minority counsel of the Senate Committee, he discovered the existence of President Richard Nixon's White House tapes. Nixon's refusal of a congressional subpoena to release the tapes was the basis of an articles of impeachment against Nixon, and led to the president's subsequent resignation on August 9, 1974. Sanders served as an officer in the United States Marine Corps, Special Agent in the Federal Bureau of Investigation, Deputy Assistant Secretary of Defense, and director of investigations for the United States Senate Select Committee on Intelligence.

== Early life and education ==
Sanders was born in St. Louis, Missouri, to Anna Marie Schmitz (1908–2008) and Howard Sanders (1906–1988). He was educated at Washington University and the University of Missouri, graduating in 1954 with a law degree. In 1952, he married Dolores Henderson (1932–2008) of Columbia, Missouri and they had three children: Deborah, Michael, and Matthew. Sanders was a Captain in the United States Marine Corps serving from 1954 until 1956.

== FBI career ==
In November 1959, Sanders completed his FBI training and was assigned to Birmingham, Alabama. He was on the team in 1961 that solved the burning of the Freedom Riders' bus by the Ku Klux Klan. In 1963, Sanders also arrested Victor Feguer, the last prisoner executed in the 20th century by the federal government. In 1961 he was assigned to Miami, Florida and then went to Washington, D.C., in 1964 as Assistant Inspector. Sanders resigned from the FBI in 1969.

== Capitol Hill ==
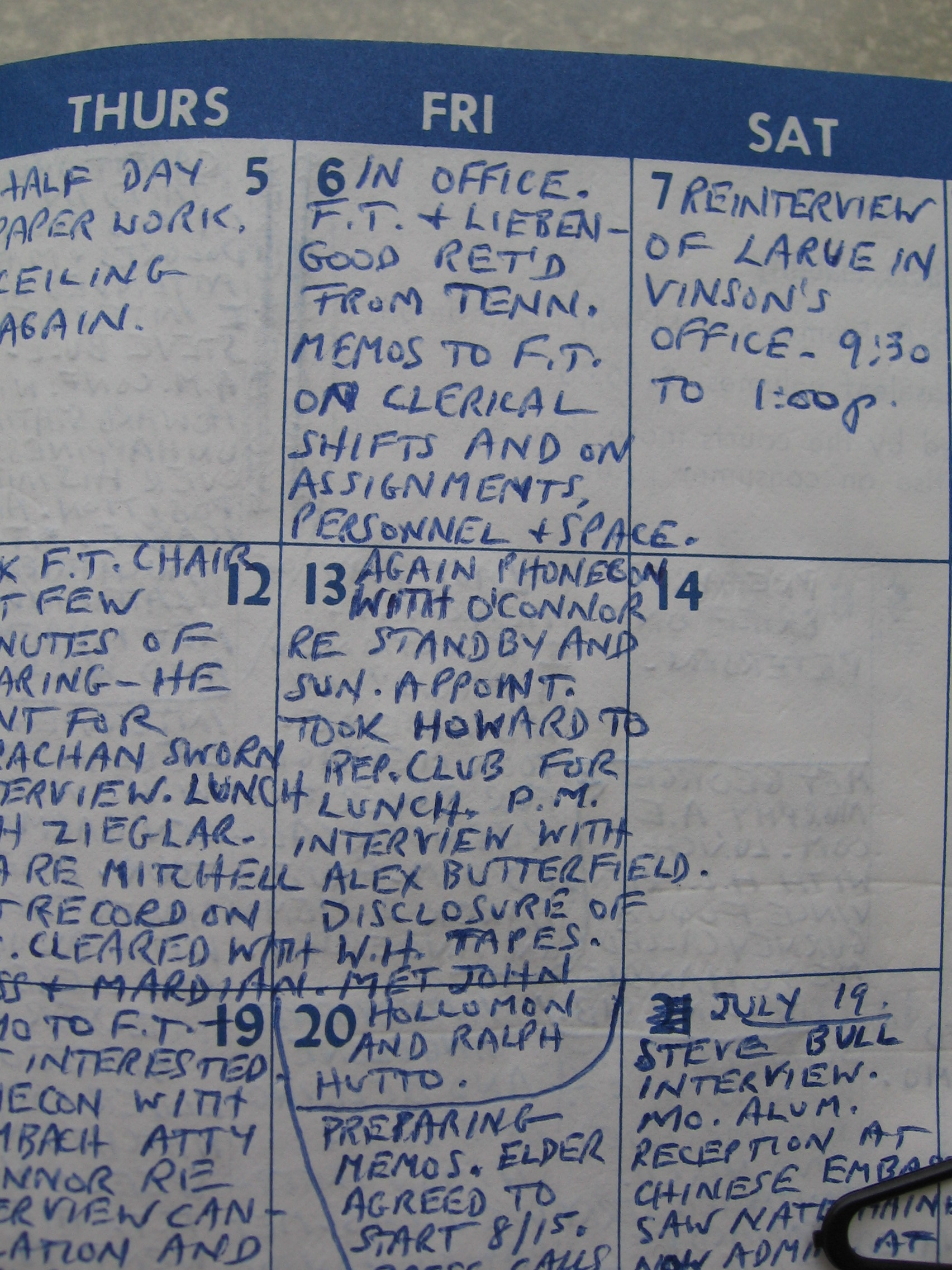
Journal Entry from July 13, 1973 P.M. Interview with Alex Butterfield. Disclosure of W.H. tapes

In February 1969, Sanders became the Chief Counsel and Chief of Staff of the House Committee on Internal Security, formerly the House Un-American Activities Committee. The HCIS investigated and held hearings for a number of organizations and individuals who were considered dangerous to national security.

Sanders was admitted to practice law before the United States Supreme Court.

He left the HCIS in March 1973 and joined the United States Senate Select Committee on Presidential Campaign Activities (Watergate Committee) as the Deputy Minority Counsel. One of Sanders' responsibilities was to gather evidence by interviewing officials and aides to find out more information about the Watergate break-in. The most famous of these interviews occurred on July 13, 1973. Alexander Butterfield (Federal Aviation Administration head and a former White House aide) was being privately questioned by Senate committee staff members, when Sanders asked if it were possible that a recording system had been used in the White House. Butterfield answered: "I wish you hadn't asked that question, but, yes, there is." Sanders went to relay the news to Fred Thompson, who was the Minority Counsel. Sanders first had to call him out of a local restaurant. "Because he was with some reporters, I got him away from them, and got him out on the street corner and told him the story," Sanders said.

On July 16, 1973, during the televised hearings, Thompson publicly asked: "Mr. Butterfield, are you aware of the installation of any listening devices in the Oval Office of the president?" The revelation of a cover-up about a taping system in the Oval Office led the House Judiciary Committee to submit three articles of impeachment of impeachment for obstruction of justice, abuse of power, and contempt of congress. After the final article was approved July 30, 1974, Nixon resigned on August 9, 1974.

== Later years ==
Afterwards, Sanders worked as a Senior Program Analyst for the Atomic Energy Commission and Deputy Assistant Secretary of Defense for Legislative Affairs (Ford administration). In the latter position, he received the Distinguished Civilian Service Award, the department's highest recognition. He returned to the Hill as director of investigations for the Senate Select Committee on Intelligence and then worked for the Senate Select Committee on Ethics.

Sanders retired from national service in 1982 and returned to practice law in Columbia, Missouri. He was elected as Boone County Commissioner in 1988, and served until 1990. He completed an MA in history from the University of Missouri in 1991. Sanders was President of the Boone County Historical Society. He and his family donated land to Boone County where Nathan Boone blazed the Booneslick Trail across central Missouri. Sanders also served as chairman of the Administrative Board of Midway Locust Grove United Methodist Church. On September 26, 1999, Sanders died of cancer at the age of 69.

== See also ==
- Federal Bureau of Investigation
- Watergate Scandal
