= William F. McKee =

United States Ary general

William Fulton McKee
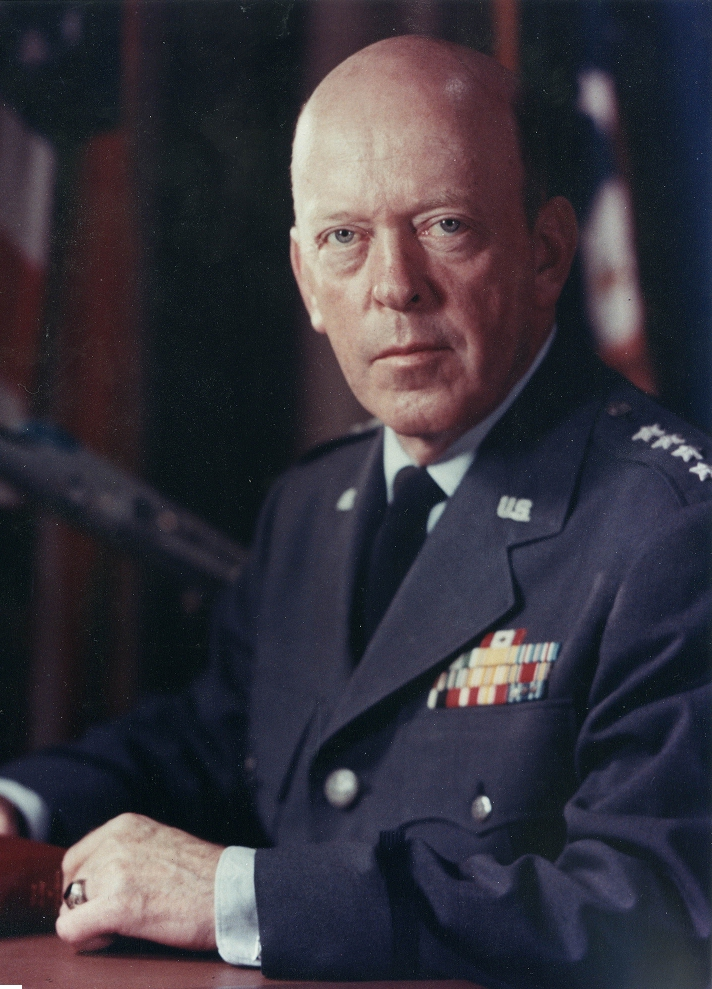
- General William Fulton McKee
- Born: October 17, 1906; Chilhowie, Virginia, US
- Died: February 28, 1987 (aged 80); San Antonio, Texas, US
- Burial place: Arlington National Cemetery
- Military career
- Allegiance: United States of America
- Branch: United States Air Force
- Service years: 1929–1964
- Rank: General
- Service number: 0-17661/467A
- Commands: Air Force Logistics Command
- Conflicts: World War II; Cold War
- Awards: Distinguished Service Medal (3)
- Other work: Federal Aviation Administration Administrator

William Fulton McKee (October 17, 1906 – February 28, 1987) was a United States Air Force four-star general who served as Commander, Air Force Logistics Command (COMAFLC) from 1961 to 1962; and Vice Chief of Staff, U.S. Air Force (VCSAF) from 1962 to 1964. He later served as the Federal Aviation Administration Administrator from 1965 to 1968.

== Military career ==
McKee was born at Chilhowie, Virginia, in 1906. He graduated from the United States Military Academy at West Point, New York, and was commissioned a second lieutenant in the Coast Artillery Corps of the United States Army June 13, 1929.

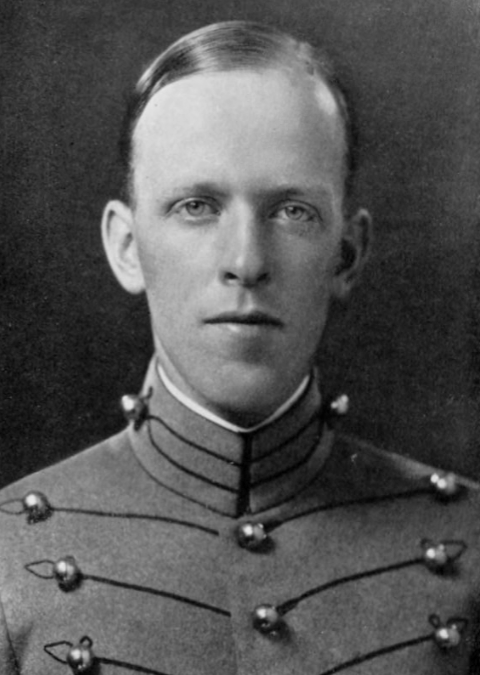
As a West Point cadet

His first assignment upon graduation was with the 13th Coast Artillery at Fort Barrancas, Florida. He then went to Fort Randolph in the Panama Canal Zone where he served as a battery officer in the First Coast Artillery. After two years service at that station, he was transferred to the 63rd Coast Artillery at Fort MacArthur, California, where he served as battery commander, assistant adjutant of the Harbor Defenses of Los Angeles, and later executive officer of the Civilian Conservation Corps in that area.

In September 1935, he became a student at the Coast Artillery School at Fort Monroe, Virginia, and upon completion of the course the following June, was assigned to Fort Mills, Corregidor, Philippine Islands; as regimental adjutant, plan training and intelligence officer, and battery commander of the 63rd Coast Artillery.

Returning to the United States in October 1938, he was assigned to Presidio of San Francisco in California, as an assistant to G-2, Ninth Corps Area.

The following October, he was again ordered to foreign duty - this time at Fort Buchanan, Puerto Rico, where he became battery commander and later commanding officer of the 66th Coast Artillery, transferring with that organization to Borinquen Field, Puerto Rico. Later he became executive officer of the Caribbean Interceptor Command under Major General Follett Bradley.

In October 1941, he returned to the United States for assignment to the 71st Coast Artillery at Fort Story, Virginia, as a battalion commander and regimental adjutant of the First Battalion. He later performed the same duties when his division moved to the Naval Operating Base at Norfolk, Virginia.

In January 1942, he was assigned to Headquarters United States Army Air Forces and was later appointed chief of the Anti-Aircraft and Airdrome Defense Section and Anti-Aircraft Artillery Division. Shortly thereafter, he became executive officer for the Directorate of Air Defense.

In November 1943, he became deputy assistant chief of Air Staff for operations, commitments, and requirements, which corresponds roughly to the present Office of the Deputy Chief of Staff, Operations.

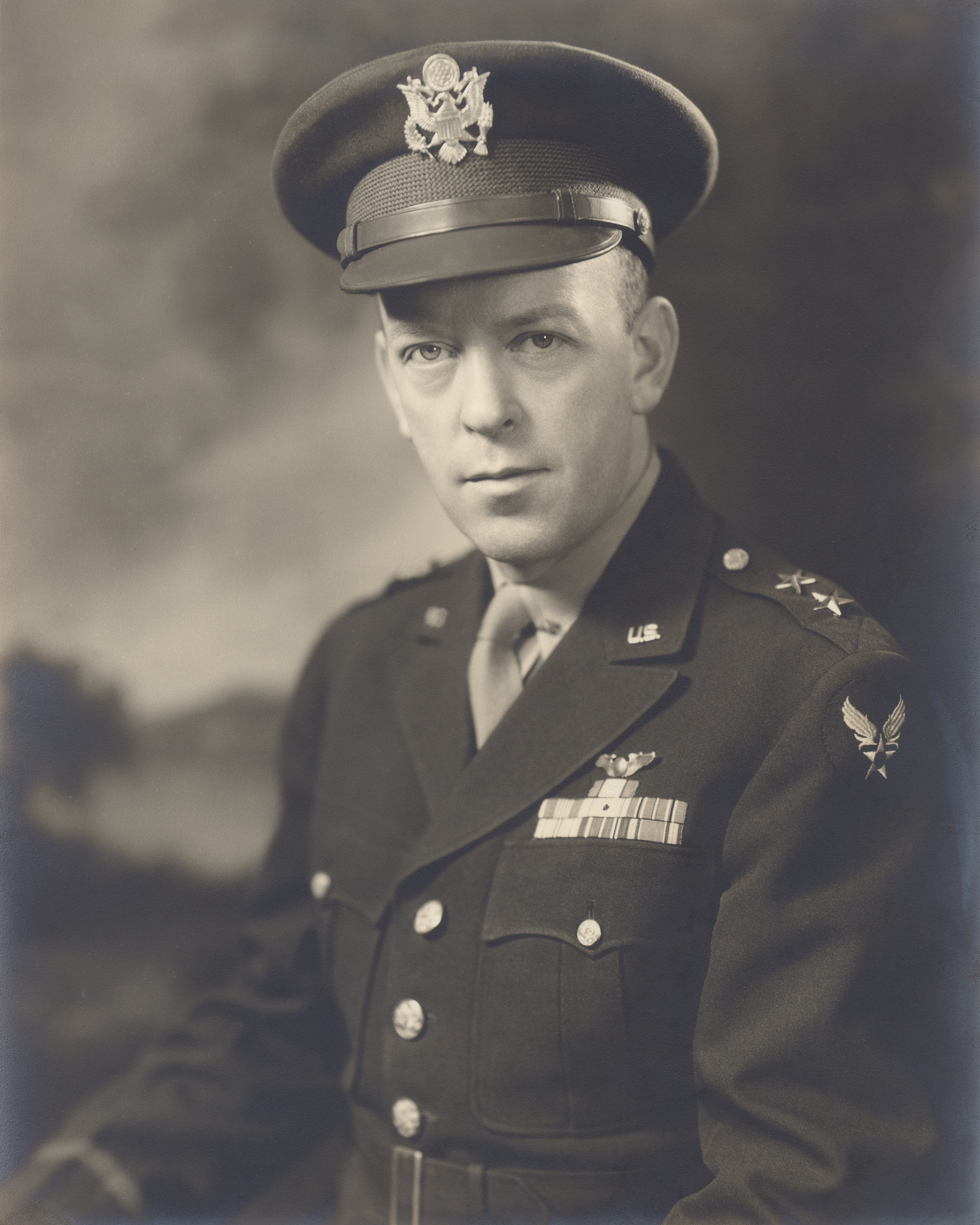
McKee as Major General

In January 1946, he was appointed chief of staff of Air Transport Command with headquarters at Washington. The following August he went to Europe as commanding general of the European Division, ATC, with station at Paris, France. In December 1946 he transferred to Headquarters U.S. Air Force in Europe at Wiesbaden, Germany, and the following month became commanding general of the Headquarters Command of USAFE at Wiesbaden.

Returning to the United States in August 1947, he was appointed assistant vice chief of staff of the U.S. Air Force on September 27, 1947.

He was assigned to Headquarters Air Materiel Command as vice commander on June 10, 1953.

On April 1, 1961, Air Materiel Command was redesignated Air Force Logistics Command.

On August 1, 1961, McKee became a four-star general and assumed the post of commander, Air Force Logistics Command.

On July 1, 1962, McKee moved to Washington and became vice chief of staff of the Air Force. McKee was awarded the U.S. Army Distinguished Service Medal with oak leaf cluster. He was presented the first annual Distinguished Management Award of the Air Force Association on July 31, 1957. He retired from the Air Force on July 31, 1964.

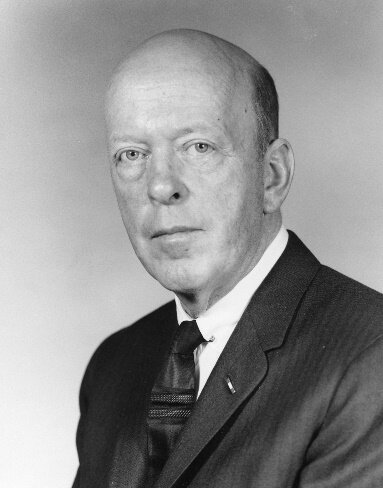
McKee as administrator of the Federal Aviation Administration

=== Military awards and decorations ===
Among Rodríguez's decorations were the following:

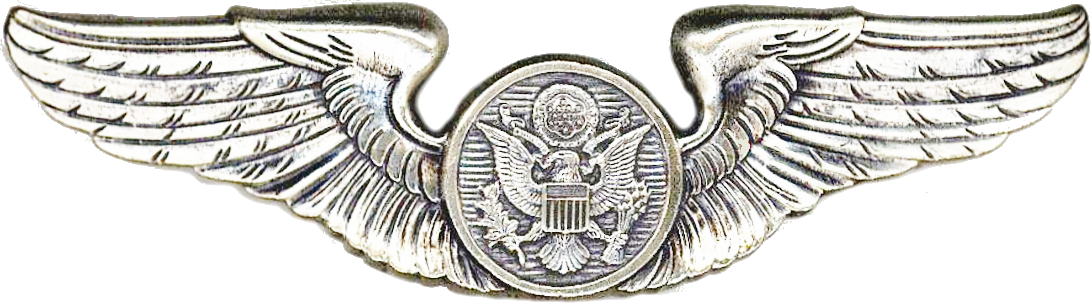

| Badge | Army Air Forces Aircrew Badge | | |
| 1st Row | Army Distinguished Service Medal with 1 bronze Oak Leaf Cluster | | |
| 2nd Row | Army Commendation Medal | American Defense Service Medal with 1 Service star | American Campaign Medal |
| 3rd Row | European–African–Middle Eastern Campaign Medal | Asiatic–Pacific Campaign Medal | World War II Victory Medal |
| 4th Row | Army of Occupation Medal | National Defense Service Medal | Air Force Longevity Service Award with 1 silver and 2 bronze Oak Leaf Clusters |

=== Effective dates of promotion ===
| Insignia | Rank | Date |
|---|---|---|
| | General | August 1, 1961 |
| | Lieutenant general | August 31, 1957 |
| | Major general | October 31, 1947 |
| | Brigadier general | January 23, 1945 |
| | Colonel | September 14, 1942 |
| | Lieutenant colonel | February 1, 1942 |
| | Major | October 10, 1941 |
| | Captain | June 13, 1939 |
| | First lieutenant | November 1, 1934 |
| | Second lieutenant | June 13, 1929 |

== Post-military career ==
After retiring from the military, McKee briefly served as the assistant administrator for management development at NASA, and in 1965 was chosen by President Johnson to head the Federal Aviation administration. After leaving the FAA, he was president of Schriever-McKee Associates (later Schriever & McKee, Inc.) in Arlington, Virginia from 1968 to 1987. He died on February 28, 1987, in San Antonio, Texas after a brief illness. His wife died in 1990, and both he and Gertrude were buried at Arlington National Cemetery.

Government offices
| Preceded by Najeeb Halaby | Administrator of the Federal Aviation Administration; 1965–1968 | Succeeded by John H. Shaffer |
