= Uher (brand) =

German electronic equipment brand

Logo 1956–2006

Uher was a German brand of electronic equipment currently owned and licensed by Assmann Electronics of Bad Homburg.

The manufacturer Uher Werke was based in Munich, Germany, and is probably best known for its former range of portable reel-to-reel tape recorders which were once widely used by professionals in areas such as reporting and film-making. Since digital equipment has become widespread, these older analogue recording machines are no longer produced. Two parts of the Uher company still exist, one which has focused on informatics, and ATIS Uher focused on IT security.

The Uher model 5000 was a centerpiece in the Nixon White House tapes scandal, when 18.5 minutes of recordings were purported to be inadvertently erased.

== Report series ==
=== Report 4000 series ===
Introduced in 1961, the "Report 4000" series of portables had a neat, compact design, about 11" wide, 10" deep, and 4" thick (28 cm × 25 cm × 10.2 cm). They used 5" reels of tape, and came in three models:

- Report 4000 - two-track mono, later four-track mono
- Report 4200 - two-track stereo (tape used in one direction), usable also as two-track mono (tape runs in both directions)
- Report 4400 - four-track stereo (tape used in both directions, being turned over in between), usable also as four-track mono

They had four speeds: 7 1/2 inches per second (i.p.s. or in/s), 3 3/4 i.p.s., 1 7/8 i.p.s., and 15/16 i.p.s. [19 cm per second (cm/s), 9.5 cm/s, 4.75 cm/s, and 2.38 cm/s]. With the longest variety of 5" tape (1800 ft. [549 m] long), and using four-track mono at 15/16 i.p.s., it would be possible to get about 24 hours' recording time on one reel of tape, albeit at poor quality suitable only for speech, and 6 hours' continuous recording time would be possible.

About one million Report 4000 were produced. The Report were built until 1999.

=== Other series ===
Based upon the mechanical design and chassis of the 4000 series recorders Uher also offered the professional

- Report 1000 (early model Rangertone sync, later Neo-Pilot)
- Report 1200 Synchro (Neo-pilot)

Full-track (one-track Mono) recorders. These ran at a single 15/2 i.p.s. [19.05 cm/s] speed and provided a sync head for motion picture sound synchronization as well as dedicated record and playback heads. These models were not widely adopted. Even German and European television tended despite outfitting their radio reports with 4000-series machines to adopt Nagra or Stellavox recorders for film production.

The final model of the Report series was the Report 6000 introduced in 1986. They featured a more modern three-motor design and electronic control.

=== Shared specs ===
All the Report recorders had small loudspeakers (mono) built into them, at various times either in the front, or on the top near the piano-key-style controls.

They had several sources of power:

- Mains power, using an internal fitting power transformer;
- Internal rechargeable dry-fit battery: both nickel-cadmium (Ni-Cd) and gel lead acid (GLA) were available
- Five standard (non-rechargeable) D-sized batteries.
- External power via a range of power adapters for automotive power (models for 6 V, 12 V and 24 V were available).

== Royal de Luxe series ==
The Royal de Luxe series was targeted at the home market. Unlike the report series these tape recorders could only be powered via the mains. Most of them had stereo speakers built in except the Uher Royal de Luxe c which required a separate amplifier and speakers. All of them used 7" reels and most of them were in stereo.

=== Uher Royal de Luxe ===
The track system used on this machine and many others is a four-track, two-channel. Exchanging the recording head assembly (containing a total of 4 heads: erasing, recording, playback and "dia-pilot") by removing only two retaining nuts, it could be converted to two-track. The machine can either record in mono or stereo. The machine has four different speeds which are: 7 1/2, 3 3/4, 1 7/8 and 15/16 i.p.s. The machine has a frequency response of 20 Hz to 20 kHz (7 1/2 i.p.s.). The input voltages are: 50 mV (line) and 2 mV (mic). The output is: 0.7757 V (line). This machine includes a feature called Dia-Pilot. This means that it can record a running commentary or music and trigger the change of slides in an automatic slide projector with a relay actuated by an inaudible pulse on the tape.

== Small cassette machines ==
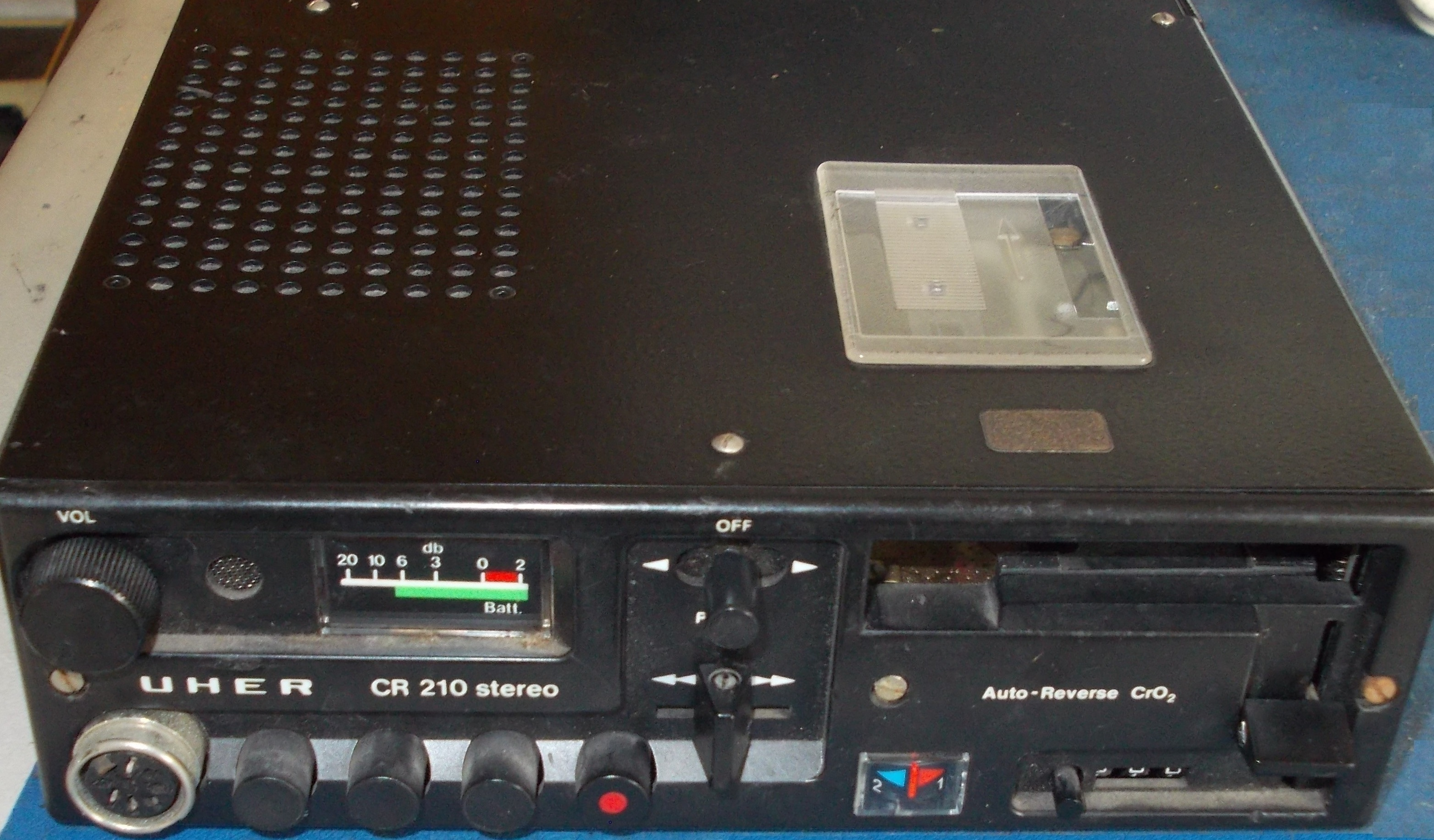
Uher CR 210 stereo (1974-1979)

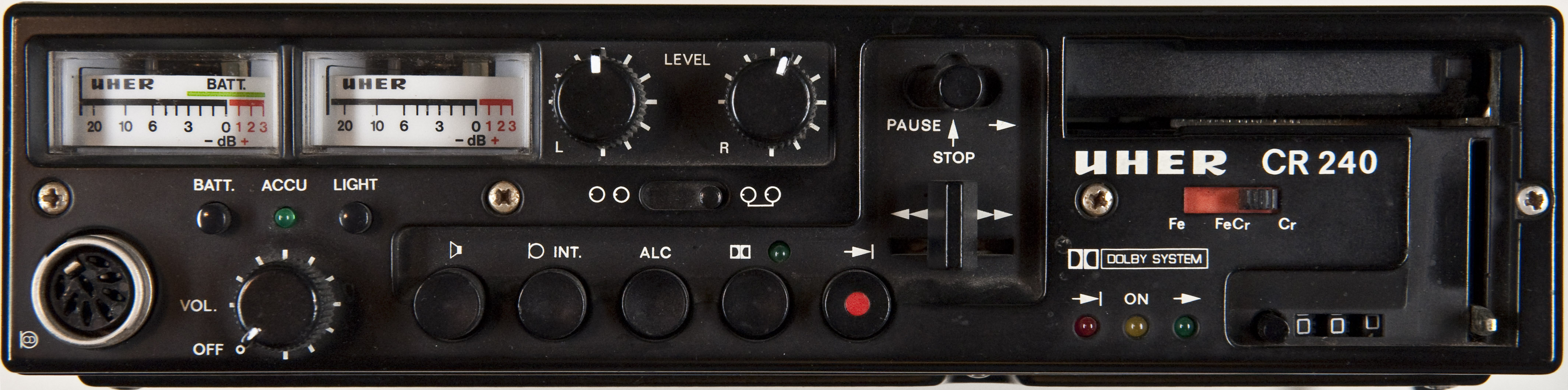
Uher CR 240 (since 1977)

Since 1971 Uher produced very small HiFi cassette machines which can be described as compact Report series: the CR 124, 1974 CR 210, since 1977 the CR 240 with Dolby B.

== Gallery ==
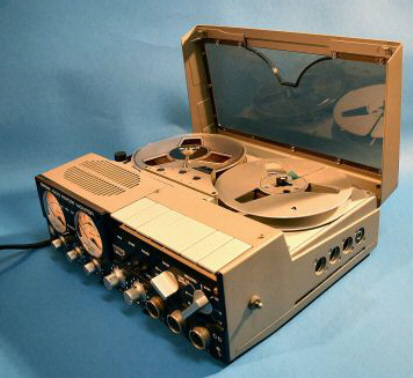
Uher Report tape recorder

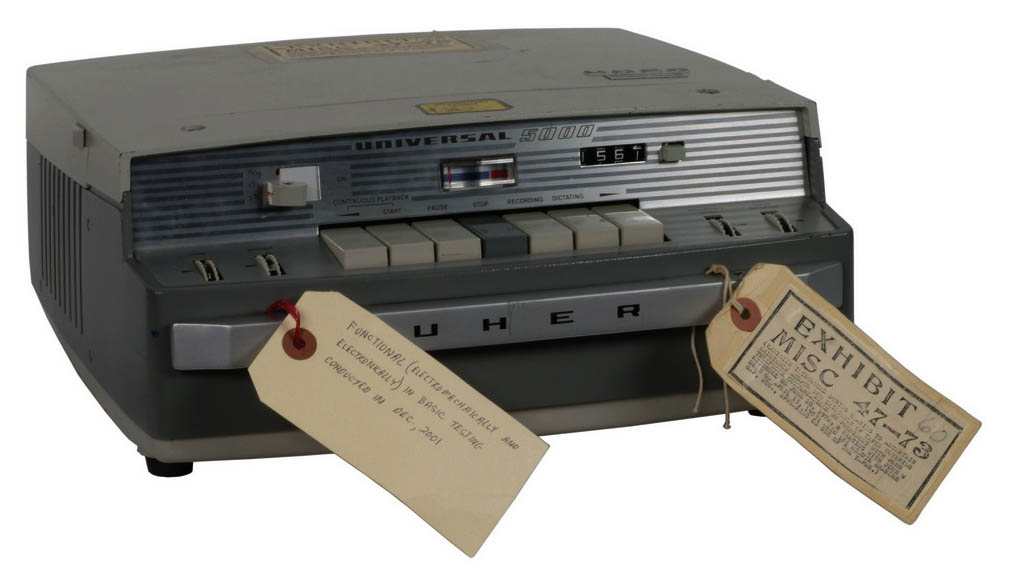
Uher 5000 with evidence tags

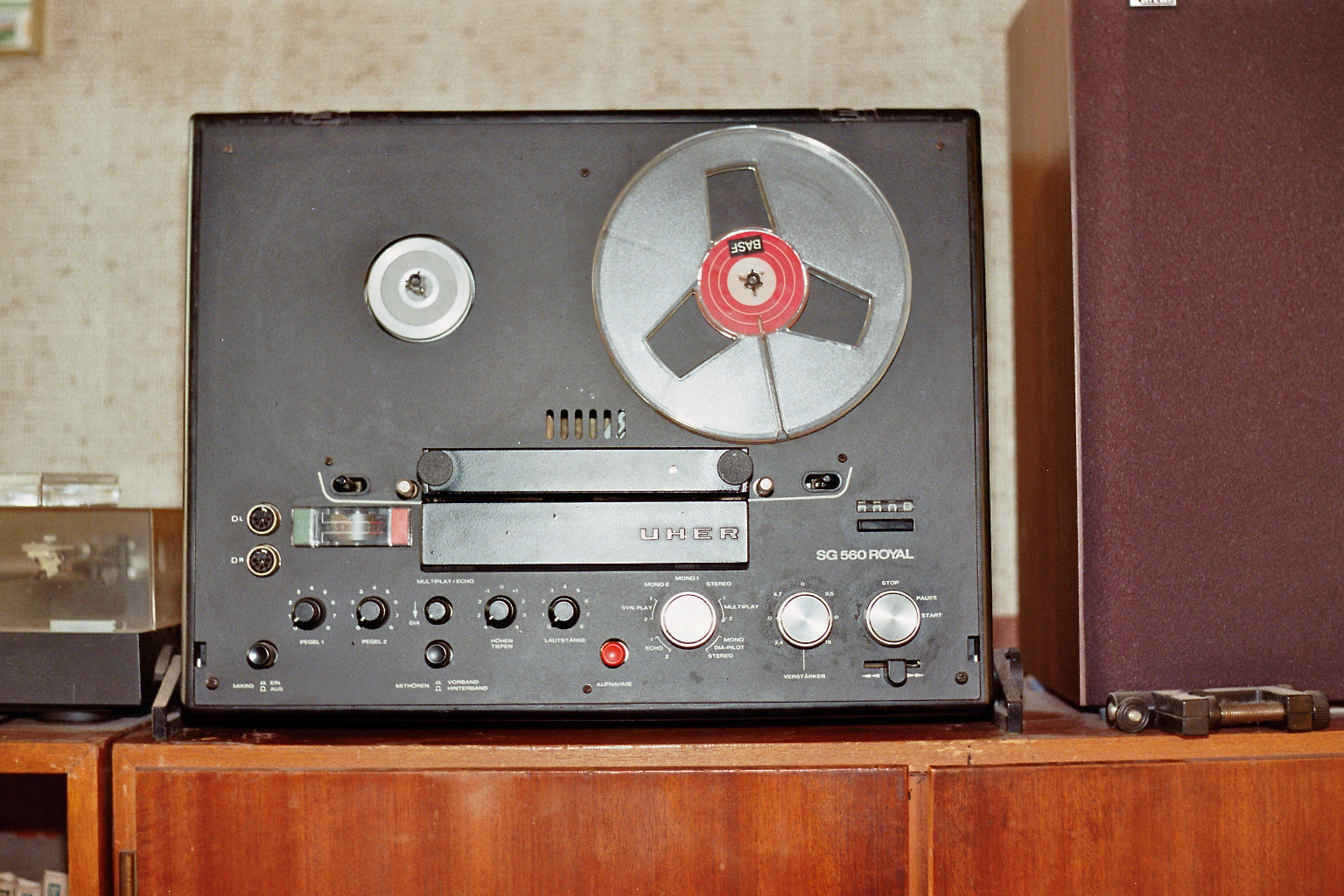
Uher SG560

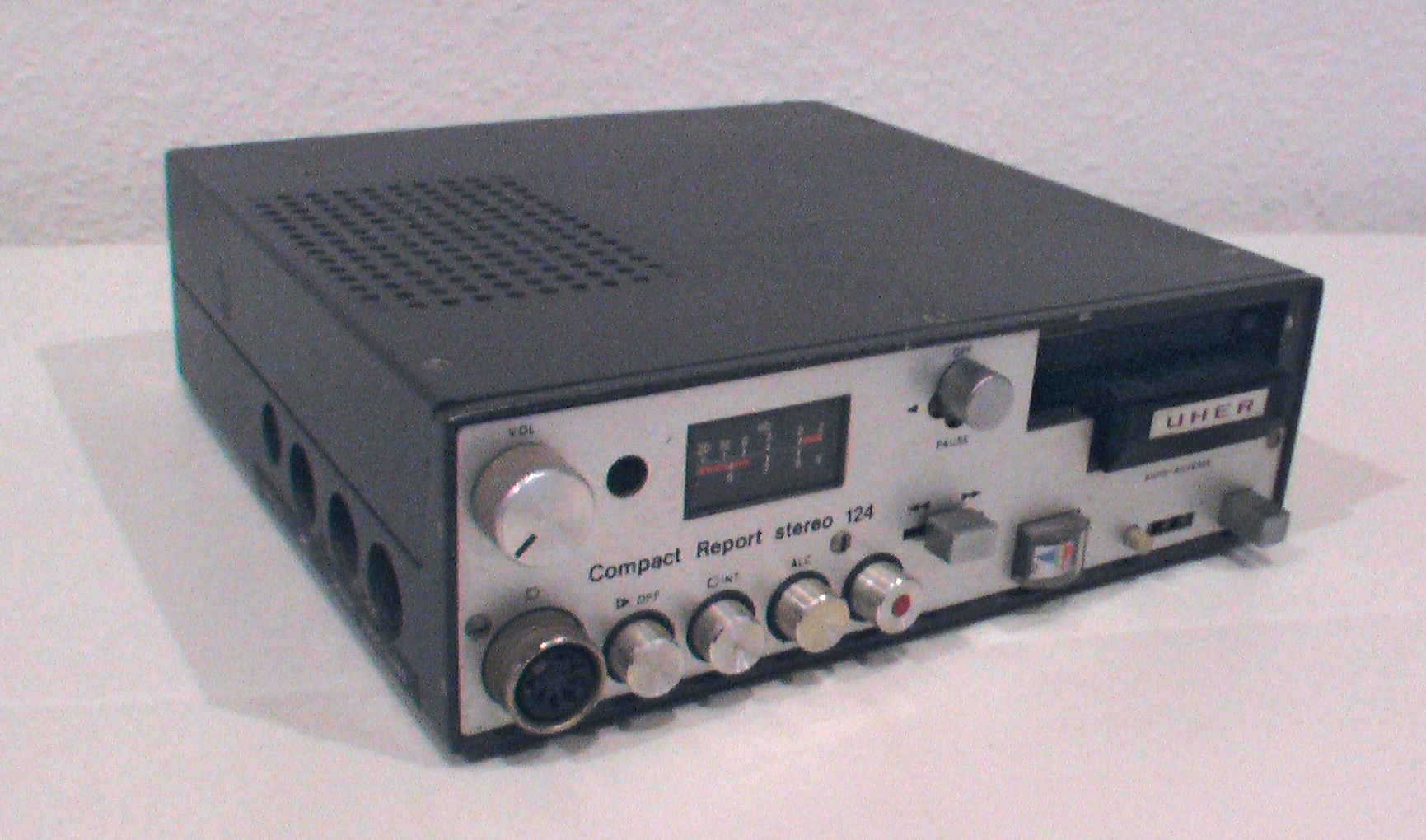
Uher Compact Report Stereo 124 (1971–1973)

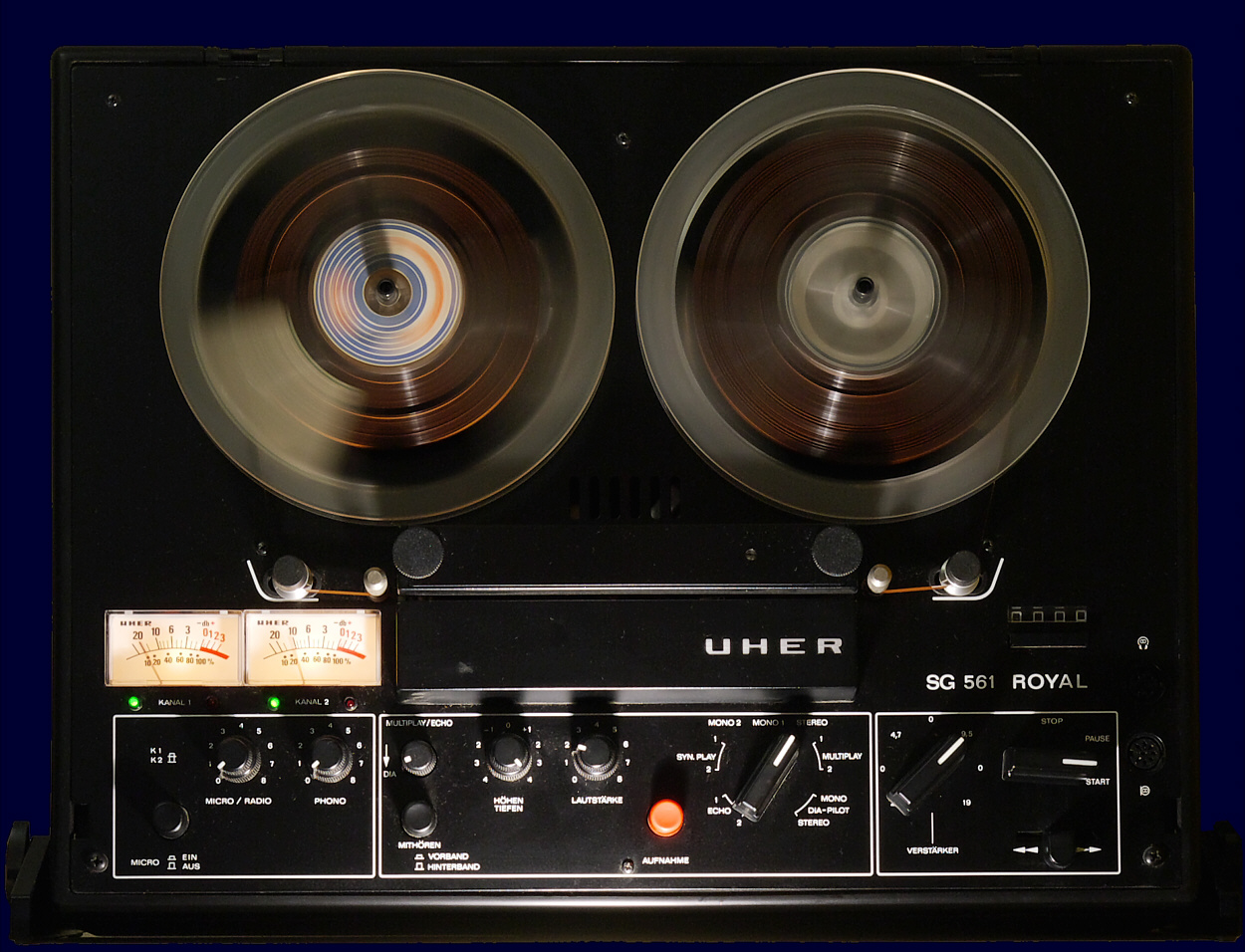
Uher SG 561 Royal (1978)
