= Stellavox =

Swiss audio equipment manufacturer

Stellavox ®

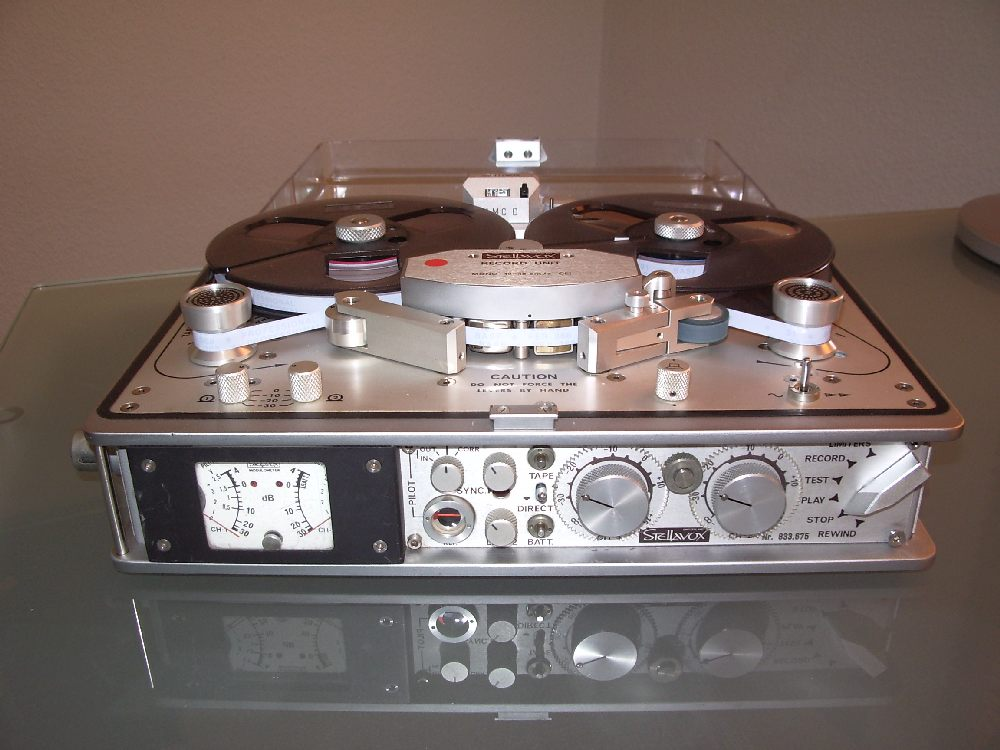
- Industry: Manufacturer, Audio
- Founded: 1955
- Headquarters: Mendrisio, Switzerland
- Key people: Georges Quellet, Stephan Schertler
- Products: Professional Audio Equipment, Recorders, Mixers
- Website: www.stellavox.swiss

Stellavox is a company based in Switzerland best known for its compact portable reel-to-reel magnetic tape audio recorders of extremely high mechanical quality, used by radio and TV-stations and motion picture location sound mixers as an alternative to the Nagra recorders. The company, founded in 1955 by Georges Quellet, was developing and manufacturing full size studio recording decks such as the Stellavox TD9 as well, which is still considered one of the best tape recorders ever made and has become a legend. Due to the high price, which was caused by the complexity of the technical solution and the precision of hand-made Swiss production, only a few hundred pieces were produced.

In the late 80s Stellavox started the development of a portable professional DAT Digital Tape Recorder, the Stelladat.

In 1989, without having reached the break-even with this new product, the owners decided that the market was evolving too fast towards computer recording and that the traditional Stellavox products did not have enough potential anymore. Financial support was dropped and all activities were stopped.

Sonosax, another small Swiss Audio company, bought the rights to continue the development of the Stelladat recorder, but stopped the project some years later. Two former technicians of the old company took their chance with the old products maintenance. In 2017 Stephan Schertler, a Swiss electronic engineer in contact with Georges Quellet and former technician Jean-Michel Simonet, reconstituted Stellavox SA now based in Mendrisio, Switzerland. The company, of which Schertler is president and Quellet is honorary president, maintains the same philosophy as its origins. It is indeed dedicated to analog technology as it once was, producing new but related products from the past, such as tape recorders and further studio recording devices. In 2020, the first product from Stellavox SA is released: the L10, an improved Input-output module for the legendary TD9.

== Notable Products ==
- 1954: Model 54
- 1956: Model 56
- 1957: Sm 0
- 1958: Sm 4 ( Fi Cord 1A in England)
- 1959: Fi-Cord 101 - Transistor dictaphone
- 1960: 5 Sm - Professional recorder for radio reporters
- 1969: SP 7 - Reel-to-reel recorder with exchangeable headblock. Nearly 2000 units built.
- 1972: 7 SQ - Quadraphonic version of the SP7
- 1975: SP 8 - Development of SP8. Sub models are SU 8, SR 8, SM 8 (a.k.a. master Stella), SI 8, SD 8th.
- 1979: 88 TD - Universal Studio Recorder
- 1984: 9 TD - Studio machine, development of TD88
- 1989: 9 SP - Further development of the SP8
- 2020:”10” L - Improved input-output module for TD9

== See also ==
- Nagra
- Uher (brand)
