= Zilch memo =

United States government document about the Vietnam War

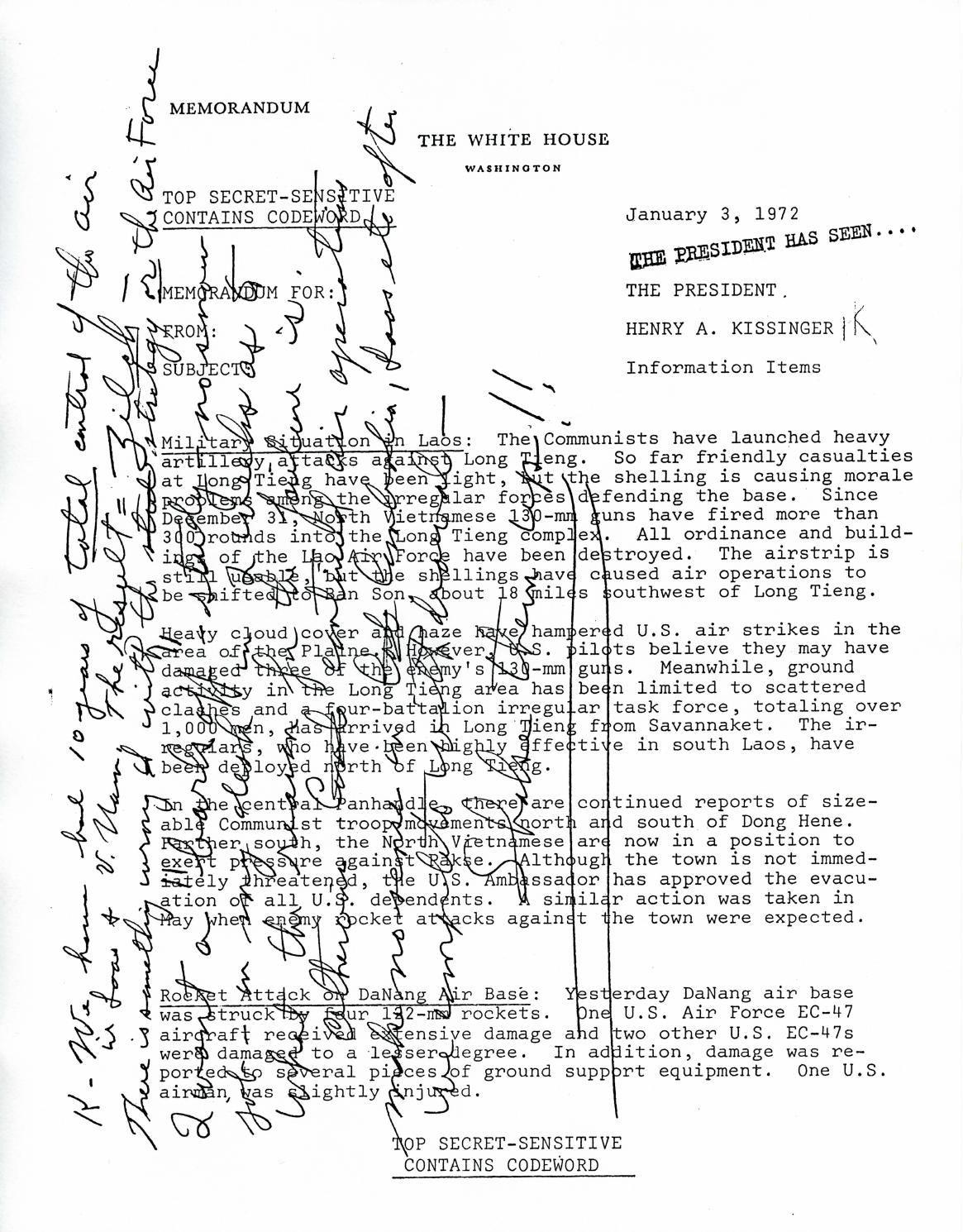
The "zilch" memo.

The Zilch memo was an American government document sent by National Security Advisor Henry Kissinger to President Richard Nixon on January 3, 1972, about the military situation in Laos during the Vietnam War. On the memo, in his own handwriting, Nixon described the decade-long bombing campaign by the United States in Southeast Asia as a "failure", having achieved "zilch", despite public comments to the contrary. Just the day before, January 2, Nixon told CBS News reporter Dan Rather in an interview that the bombing was "very, very effective". Previously missing from the Richard Nixon Library, the memo was discovered in the possession of Alexander Butterfield, who served as the Deputy Assistant to President Nixon from 1969 to 1973, by Washington Post reporter Bob Woodward, who subsequently published it in his 2015 book The Last of the President's Men.

Despite Nixon's private assessment that the bombing was a "failure", U.S. bombing in Southeast Asia increased in 1972.

== The memo ==
On January 3, 1972, Kissinger sent a one-page classified memo to Nixon as a routine update on the Vietnam War. After receiving the memo, Nixon tilted it sideways and wrote in pen to Kissinger:

K. We have had 10 years of total control of the air in Laos and V.Nam. The result = Zilch. There is something wrong with the strategy or the Air Force. I want a 'bark off' study—no snow job—on my desk in 2 weeks as to what the reason for the failure is. Otherwise continued air operations make no sense in Cambodia, Laos etc. after we complete withdrawal. Shake them up!!

== Bibliography ==
- Woodward, Bob (2015). The Last of the President's Men. New York: Simon & Schuster. ISBN 9781501116445.
