= John H. Shaffer =

Administrator of the Federal Aviation Administration

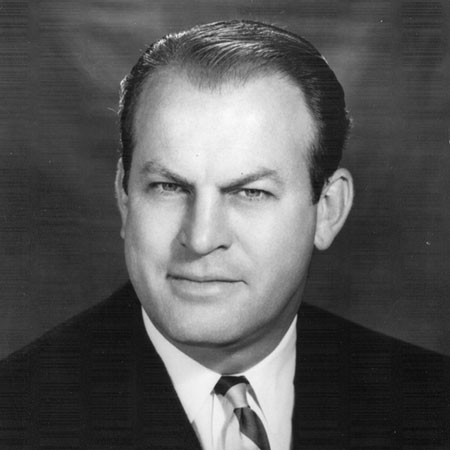

4th Administrator of the Federal Aviation Administration
- In office March 24, 1969 – March 14, 1973
- Appointed by: Richard Nixon
- Preceded by: William F. McKee
- Succeeded by: Alexander Butterfield

Personal details
- Born: John Hixon Shaffer; February 25, 1919 Everett, Pennsylvania, U.S.
- Died: September 14, 1997 (aged 78) Frederick, Maryland, U.S.
- Spouse: Joan Van Week (m. 1943)
- Education: United States Military Academy (1943); Air Force Institute of Technology (1945); Columbia University

John Hixon Shaffer (February 25, 1919 – September 14, 1997) was an administrator of the Federal Aviation Administration from March 24, 1969 until March 14, 1973.

Shaffer was the administrator during an en-masse calling-in-sick strike by air traffic controllers in 1969. He threatened to fire controllers who didn't return to work within 24 hours, calling them "ill-advised". In the summer, Shaffer testified to a congressional committee that air traffic controllers were neither overworked nor underpaid. Shaffer's testimony increased pressure on controllers to return to their jobs. Celebrity lawyer F. Lee Bailey of the Professional Air Traffic Controllers Organization (PATCO) stated, "This guy Shaffer has got to go." The FAA and Shaffer were both later attacked by the PATCO for continuing to operate the air traffic system despite the low number of controllers.

On December 3, 1970, he testified to Congress about aviation safety.

Following his retirement from the FAA, Shaffer was involved in a debate over the use of microwave landing systems in civil aviation and which country's industry should be awarded a contract for construction of the equipment: the US, UK, or Germany. Shaffer himself agreed with British assessments that the American manufactured MLS system was inferior and poorly tested.

== McDonnell Douglas DC-10 accidents ==
On June 12, 1972, American Airlines Flight 96 safely performed an emergency landing in Detroit, Michigan, after a cargo door broke off the plane – a McDonnell Douglas DC-10 – while in the air. Shaffer reached a "gentleman's agreement" with Jackson McGowen, the director of McDonnell Douglas, in which the FAA issued a voluntary, confidential service bulletin, rather than a legally enforced, publicized airworthiness directive, to fix the DC-10's safety issues.

On March 3, 1974, Turkish Airlines Flight 981 – also a DC-10 – crashed in France after losing a cargo door in a manner similar to Flight 96. All 346 people on board died, making it the deadliest crash in aviation history at the time. The plane had not received the change suggested by the service bulletin.

Shaffer, who left the FAA before Flight 981 crashed, defended the administration's actions. He argued that the change might not have been made even under an airworthiness directive, because the FAA trusted manufacturers to self-certify fixes and did not verify compliance. The US Senate held a hearing on the DC-10's safety, and in its conclusions criticized the FAA for weak enforcement and secretive proceedings.

== Awards ==
- 1972 Wright Brothers Memorial Trophy

== Notes ==
Government offices
Preceded by William F. McKee	Administrator of the Federal Aviation Administration; 1969–1973	Succeeded by Alexander Butterfield
