= United States Senate Watergate Committee =

1973 US Senate committee to investigate the Watergate scandal

Senate Watergate Committee
Special committee
- Defunct United States Senate; 93rd Congress

History
- Formed: February 7, 1973
- Disbanded: June 27, 1974 (abolished, when the committee's final report was published)

Leadership
- Chair: Sam Ervin (D)
- Ranking Member: Howard Baker (R)

Structure
- Seats: 7 members
- Political parties: Majority (4): Democratic (4); Minority (3): Republican (3)

Jurisdiction
- Purpose: To investigate "illegal, improper, or unethical activities" conducted by individuals involved with a campaign, nomination, and/or election of any candidate for President of the United States in the 1972 presidential election, and produce a final report with the committee's findings.

Rules
- S.Res. 60, 93rd Cong. (1973).

The Senate Watergate Committee, known officially as the Select Committee on Presidential Campaign Activities, was a special committee established by the United States Senate, S.Res. 60, in 1973, to investigate the Watergate scandal, with the power to investigate the break-in at the Democratic National Committee (DNC) headquarters at the Watergate Hotel in the Watergate complex in Washington, D.C., and any subsequent cover-up of criminal activity, as well as "all other illegal, improper, or unethical conduct occurring during the controversial 1972 presidential election, including political espionage and campaign finance practices".

American print news media focused the nation's attention on the issue with hard-hitting investigative reports, while television news outlets brought the drama of the hearings to the living rooms of millions of American households, broadcasting the proceedings live for two weeks in May 1973. The public television network PBS broadcast the hearings from gavel to gavel on more than 150 national affiliates.

Working under committee chairman Sam Ervin, the committee played a pivotal role in gathering evidence that would lead to the indictment of forty administration officials and the conviction of several of Richard Nixon's aides for obstruction of justice and other crimes. Its revelations later prompted the impeachment process against Nixon himself, which featured the introduction of three articles of impeachment by the Democratic-led House Committee on the Judiciary. Watergate led to Nixon's resignation on August 9, 1974.

== Background ==
Shortly after midnight on June 17, 1972, five men were arrested inside the DNC offices. The FBI launched an investigation of the incident, and the dogged reporting of two Washington Post journalists, Bob Woodward and Carl Bernstein, raised questions and suggested connections between Richard Nixon's controversial reelection campaign and the men awaiting trial. The White House denied any connection to the break-in, and Nixon won reelection in a landslide. Following confirmation that such a connection did in fact exist, the Senate voted 77–0 in February 1973 to create the Select Committee on Presidential Campaign Activities.

Before the election, the House Banking Committee chaired by Wright Patman (D-TX) held hearings on Watergate but were stymied by Nixon Administration officials. A vote to issue subpoenas in October 1972 failed when several Democratic members joined all Republican members of the committee to oppose the vote. The failure of the committee hearings formed an impetus for action in the Senate.

== Members ==
The members of the Senate Watergate Committee were:

Democratic Party members	State
Sam Ervin, Chair	North Carolina
Daniel Inouye	Hawaii
Joseph Montoya	New Mexico
Herman Talmadge	Georgia

Republican Party members	State
Howard Baker, Ranking Member	Tennessee
Edward Gurney	Florida
Lowell Weicker	Connecticut

The chief counsel of the Committee was Samuel Dash, who directed the investigation. The minority counsel was Fred Thompson. Members of the Senate Watergate Committee's professional staff included:

- Scott Armstrong
- David M. Dorsen (Assistant Chief Counsel)
- Rufus Edmisten (Deputy Counsel)
- Gordon Freedman
- James Hamilton (Assistant Chief Counsel)
- Terry Lenzner (Assistant Chief Counsel)
- Marc Lackritz
- Robert Muse
- Donald Sanders (Deputy Minority Counsel – Republican)
- Jill Wine-Banks (prosecutor's staff)

== Hearings ==
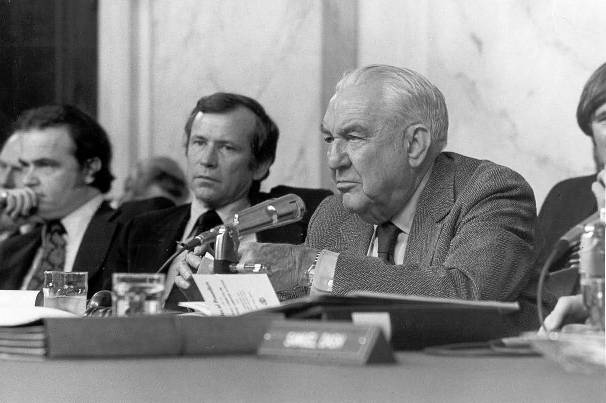
From left to right: minority counsel Fred Thompson, ranking member Howard Baker, and chair Sam Ervin of the Senate Watergate Committee in 1973.

Hearings opened on May 17, 1973, and the Committee issued its seven-volume, 1,250-page report on June 27, 1974, titled Report on Presidential Campaign Activities. The first weeks of the committee's hearings were a national political and cultural event. They were broadcast live during the day on commercial television; at the start, CBS, NBC, and ABC covered them simultaneously, and then later on a rotation basis, while PBS replayed the hearings at night. Some 319 hours were broadcast overall, and 85% of U.S. households watched some portion of them. The audio feed also was broadcast, gavel-to-gavel, on scores of National Public Radio stations, making the hearings available to people in their cars and workplaces, and increased the profile of the fledgling broadcast organization.

The hearings made stars out of both Ervin, who became known for his folksy manner and wisdom but resolute determination, and Baker, who appeared somewhat non-partisan and uttered the famous phrase "What did the President know, and when did he know it?" (often paraphrased by others in later scandals). It was the introduction to the public for minority counsel Thompson, who would later become an actor, senator, and presidential candidate.

Many of Watergate's most famous moments happened during the hearings. During former White House counsel John Dean's four days before the committee, he testified about the cover-up, who was involved including himself and events related to it, including him telling Nixon on March 21 that there was a "cancer on the Presidency") . Dean confirmed to Inouye that the Nixon White House kept a list of its enemies – including Weicker, who then called for added transparency in the executive branch. Meanwhile, FAA chairman and former White House deputy assistant Alexander Butterfield revealed the existence of the secret Nixon White House tapes and Ervin sparred with former Nixon chief domestic policy advisor John Ehrlichman about whether constitutional law allowed a President to sanction such actions as the Watergate break-in and a break-in at the office of the psychiatrist to Daniel Ellsberg, the former assistant to the Assistant Secretary of Defense for International Security Affairs who had leaked the Pentagon Papers.
