= Lawrence Higby =

American businessman and political activist

Lawrence M. Higby is an American businessman and political activist. Higby was assistant to White House Chief of Staff H. R. Haldeman during the Nixon Administration. He later went on to become CEO of home medical equipment company Apria. Until 2005, Higby led a group of wealthy Republicans called the New Majority PAC.

== Nixon White House ==
Higby was the recipient of a 1971 memo from John Dean that contained Nixon's Enemies List. Higby's boss Haldeman eventually served 18 months in prison for conspiracy, obstruction of justice and perjury in the Watergate scandal.

Watergate informant "Deep Throat" (W. Mark Felt) once referred to Higby as a "young-punk nobody who does what he is told to do." The Nixon White House also referred to a particularly effective administrative assistant as "a higby."

== Healthcare industry ==
Higby became chief operating officer of Lake Forest, California-based Apria Healthcare in 1997. Higby worked to dump unprofitable managed care contracts and diversify from Medicare-funded home oxygen services and respiratory drugs.

Apria Healthcare Group Inc. is a national provider of home healthcare via the following 3 service lines: Respiratory Therapy, Home Infusion Therapy, Home medical equipment.
