= Samuel Dash =

American lawyer

Sam Dash
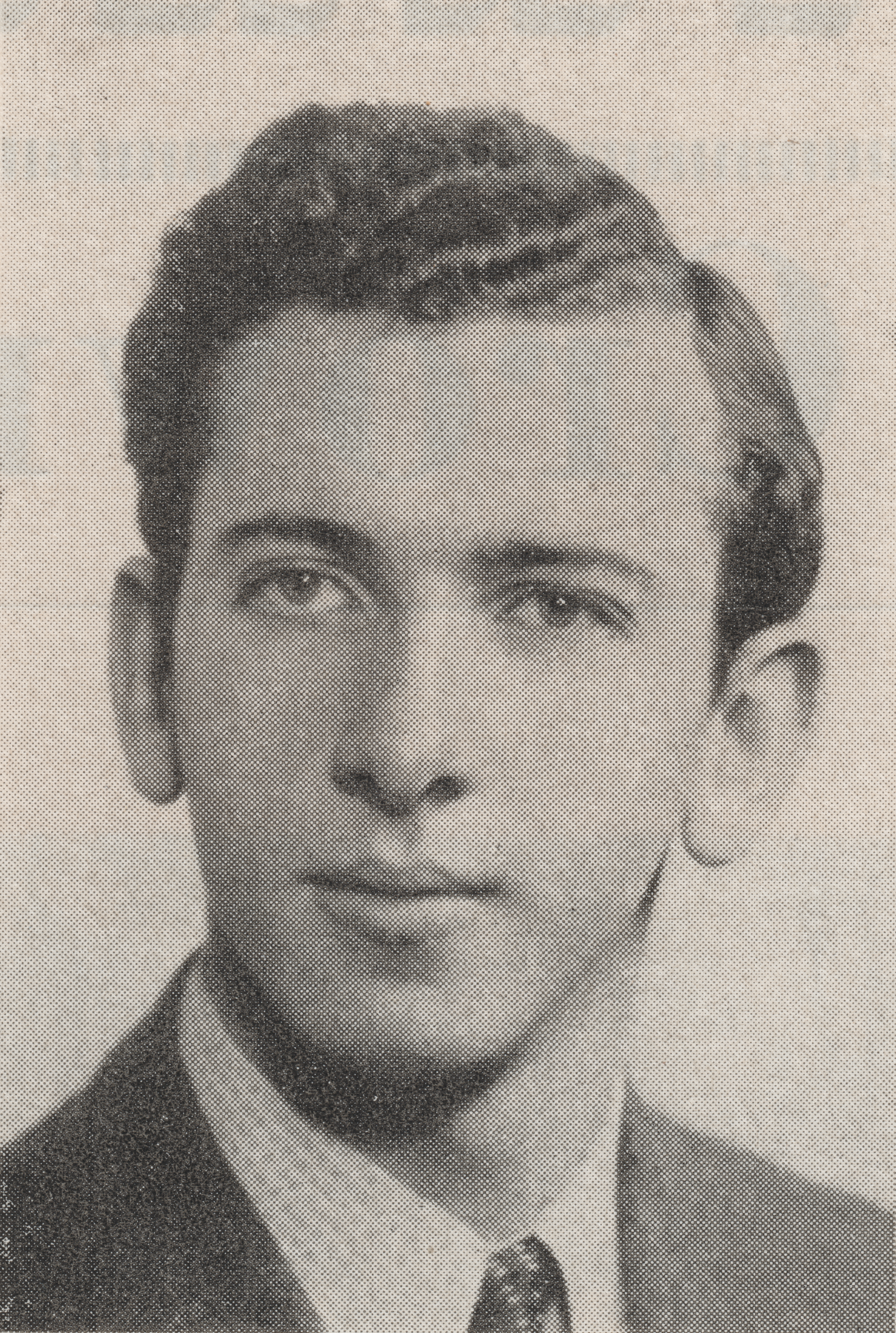
- Born: February 27, 1925; Camden, New Jersey, U.S.
- Died: May 29, 2004 (aged 79); Washington, D.C., U.S.
- Education: Temple University (BA); Harvard University (JD)
- Occupation: lawyer
- Known for: Chief counsel for the Senate Watergate Committee
- Political party: Democratic
- Spouse: Sara Dash (1947–2004)
- Children: 2

Signature
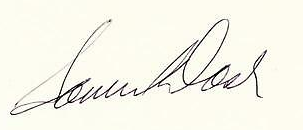

Samuel Joseph Dash (February 27, 1925 – May 29, 2004) was an American lawyer. He was chief counsel for the Senate Watergate Committee during the Watergate scandal. Dash became famous for his televised interrogations during the hearings held by the United States Congress on the Watergate incident.

== Early life and education ==
Dash was born in Camden, New Jersey, to Joseph and Ida Dash (originally Dashevsky), Jewish immigrants from the Soviet Union. His family later moved to Philadelphia.

He graduated from Central High School in Philadelphia and went on to study at Temple University. While in high school he was the president of the Interscholastic League of Student Associations. He interrupted his studies when at the age of 18, with the United States engaged in fighting World War II, Dash enlisted in the Army Air Corps and served as a bombardier navigator, flying missions over Italy. After the war, he finished his undergraduate degree at Temple University in 1947. Dash then studied at Harvard Law School where he gained his degree in 1950.

== Career ==
In 1955, Dash became a district attorney in Philadelphia, Pennsylvania. He later went into private practice.

Dash became a law professor at Georgetown University, where he was working when he was asked to help United States Senator Sam Ervin, head of the Senate Committee charged to investigate the possible involvement of President Richard Nixon in the burglary of offices used by the Democratic Party at the Watergate Hotel in Washington, D.C., and the effort to obstruct investigation of the burglary. The university gave Dash a leave of absence to do this work, and he became the committee's chief counsel.

According to Bob Woodward in his 2026 memoir Secrets, Dash was an "important secret source of [Woodward's] for many years."

Two decades later, Dash was again in the news, after resigning his post as ethics adviser to independent counsel Kenneth Starr. After working for the investigation for four years, Dash resigned to protest Starr's appearance before the United States House Committee on the Judiciary. Dash thought that Starr was acting as an "aggressive advocate" instead of an impartial investigator.

Dash returned to Georgetown, where, for nearly 40 years, he taught criminal procedure. In 1976, he was elected to the Common Cause National Governing Board. Shortly before his death, he published The Intruders: Unreasonable Searches and Seizures from King John to John Ashcroft, which discusses the risks to freedom in modern society, particularly in the wake of the PATRIOT Act.

== Death ==
Dash died in Washington, D.C., of congestive heart failure, aged 79, on the same day as Archibald Cox, the special prosecutor for the Watergate scandal.

== Media appearances ==
- Appearances on C-SPAN
- In the WETA-TV 2-part special Summer of Judgment: The Watergate Hearings in 1983, marking 10 years after the hearings.
- In Episode 4 of the TV adaptation of Slow Burn Season 1 on the Watergate hearings (via archival footage).
