= Sylvia Bernstein =

Sylvia Bernstein may refer to:

- Sylvia Bernstein (activist) (1915–2003), American civil rights activist
- Sylvia Bernstein (artist) (1914–1990), American painter
- Sylvia Bernstein (screenwriter) (1900–1979), American screenwriter and playwright
