= Warren E. Burger =

Chief Justice of the United States from 1969 to 1986

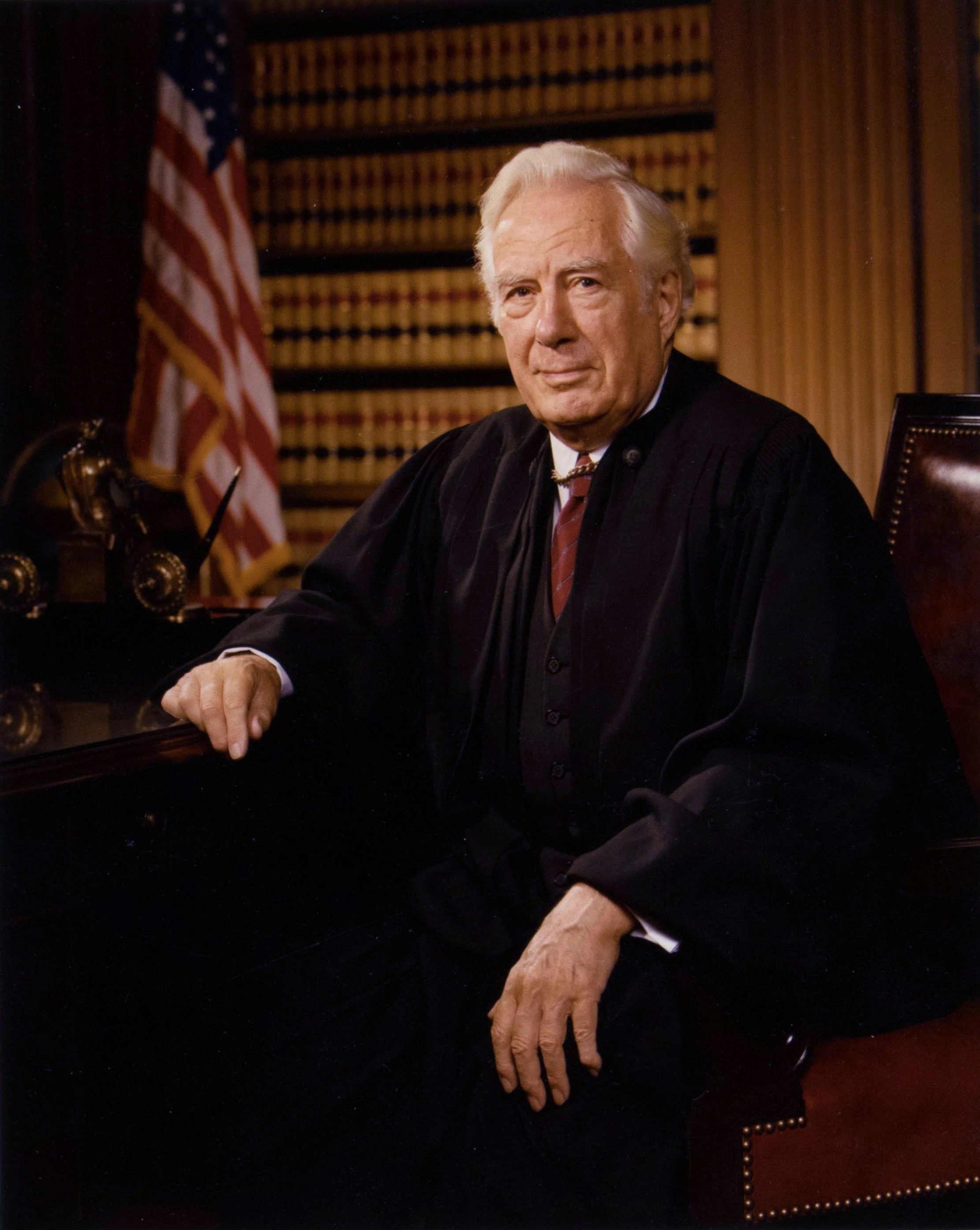
- Official portrait, 1986

15th Chief Justice of the United States
- In office June 23, 1969 – September 26, 1986
- Nominated by: Richard Nixon
- Preceded by: Earl Warren
- Succeeded by: William Rehnquist

20th Chancellor of the College of William & Mary
- In office June 26, 1986 – July 1, 1993
- President: Paul R. Verkuil; Timothy J. Sullivan
- Preceded by: Alvin Duke Chandler (1974)
- Succeeded by: Margaret Thatcher

Judge of the United States Court of Appeals for the District of Columbia Circuit
- In office March 29, 1956 – June 23, 1969
- Nominated by: Dwight D. Eisenhower
- Preceded by: Harold Montelle Stephens
- Succeeded by: Malcolm Richard Wilkey

11th United States Assistant Attorney General for the Civil Division
- In office May 1, 1953 – April 14, 1956
- President: Dwight D. Eisenhower
- Preceded by: Holmes Baldridge
- Succeeded by: George Cochran Doub

Personal details
- Born: Warren Earl Burger; September 17, 1907 Saint Paul, Minnesota, U.S.
- Died: June 25, 1995 (aged 87) Washington, D.C., U.S.
- Resting place: Arlington National Cemetery
- Party: Republican
- Spouse: Elvera Stromberg (m. 1933; died 1994)
- Children: 2
- Education: St. Paul College of Law (LLB), University of Minnesota
- Warren E. Burger's voice Warren E. Burger delivers the opinion of the Court in Houchins v. KQED, Inc. Recorded June 26, 1978

Warren Earl Burger (September 17, 1907 – June 25, 1995) was an American attorney and jurist who served as the 15th chief justice of the United States from 1969 to 1986.

Born in Saint Paul, Minnesota, Burger graduated from the St. Paul College of Law in 1931. He helped secure the Minnesota delegation's support for Dwight D. Eisenhower at the 1952 Republican National Convention. After Eisenhower won the 1952 presidential election, he appointed Burger to the position of Assistant Attorney General in charge of the Civil Division. In 1956, Eisenhower appointed Burger to the United States Court of Appeals for the District of Columbia Circuit. Burger served on this court until 1969 and became known as a critic of the Warren Court.

In 1969, President Richard Nixon nominated Burger to succeed Earl Warren as Chief Justice, and Burger won Senate confirmation with little opposition. He did not emerge as a strong intellectual force on the Court, but sought to improve the administration of the federal judiciary. He also helped establish the National Center for State Courts and the Supreme Court Historical Society. Burger remained on the Court until his retirement in 1986, when he became Chairman of the Commission on the Bicentennial of the United States Constitution. He was succeeded as Chief Justice by William H. Rehnquist, who had served as an associate justice since 1972.

In 1974, Burger wrote for a unanimous court in United States v. Nixon, which rejected Nixon's invocation of executive privilege in the wake of the Watergate scandal. The ruling played a major role in Nixon's resignation. Burger joined the majority in Roe v. Wade in holding that the right to privacy prohibited states from banning abortions. Later analyses have suggested that Burger joined the majority in Roe solely to prevent Justice William O. Douglas from controlling assignment of the opinion. Burger's later votes aligned with this suspicion when he abandoned Roe in Harris v. McRae (voting with the majority), formally launching the restrictive Hyde Amendment into effect, and in Thornburgh v. American College of Obstetricians and Gynecologists (voting with the dissent). His majority opinion in INS v. Chadha struck down the one-house legislative veto.

Although Burger was nominated by a conservative president, the Burger Court also delivered some of the most liberal decisions regarding abortion, capital punishment, religious establishment, sex discrimination, and school desegregation during his tenure.

== Early life ==
Burger was born in Saint Paul, Minnesota, in 1907, as one of seven children. His parents, Katharine (née Schnittger) and Charles Joseph Burger, a traveling salesman and railroad cargo inspector, were of Austrian German descent. He was raised Presbyterian. His grandfather, Joseph Burger, was born in Bludenz, Vorarlberg, had emigrated from Tyrol, Austria and joined the Union Army when he was 13. Joseph Burger fought and was wounded in the Civil War, resulting in the loss of his right arm and was awarded the Medal of Honor at the age of 14. At age 16, Joseph Burger became one of the youngest captains in the Union Army and would go on to become a member of the Minnesota state legislature.

Burger grew up on the family farm near the edge of Saint Paul. At age 8, he stayed home from school for a year after contracting polio. Burger attended the same grade school as future Associate Justice Harry Blackmun. He attended John A. Johnson High School, where he was president of the student council. He competed in hockey, football, track, and swimming. While in high school, he wrote articles on high school sports for local newspapers. He graduated in 1925, and received a partial scholarship to attend Princeton University, which he declined because his family's finances were not sufficient to cover the remainder of his expenses.

That same year, Burger also worked with the crew building the Robert Street Bridge, a crossing of the Mississippi River in Saint Paul that still exists.

== Education and early career ==
Burger enrolled in extension classes at the University of Minnesota for two years while selling insurance for Mutual Life Insurance. Afterward, he enrolled at St. Paul College of Law (which later became William Mitchell College of Law, now Mitchell Hamline School of Law), receiving his Bachelor of Laws, magna cum laude, in 1931. He took a job at a St. Paul law firm. In 1937, Burger served as the eighth president of the Saint Paul Jaycees. He also taught for twenty-two years at William Mitchell. A spinal condition prevented Burger from serving in the military during World War II; instead he supported the war effort at home, including service on Minnesota's emergency war labor board from 1942 to 1947. From 1948 to 1953, he served on the governor of Minnesota's interracial commission, which worked on issues related to racial desegregation. He also served as president of St. Paul's Council on Human Relations, which considered ways to improve the relationship between the city's police department and its minority residents.

Burger's political career began uneventfully, but he soon rose to national prominence. He supported Minnesota Governor Harold Stassen's unsuccessful pursuit of the Republican nomination for president in 1948. At the 1952 Republican National Convention, Burger played a key role in Dwight D. Eisenhower's nomination by leading the Minnesota delegates to change their votes from Stassen to Eisenhower after Stassen failed to obtain 10 percent of the vote, which freed the Minnesota delegation from their pledge to support him.

== Assistant Attorney General ==
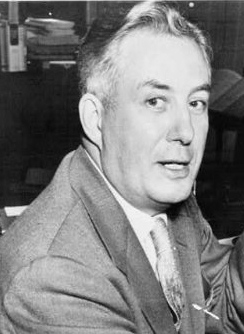
Burger as Assistant Attorney General

President Eisenhower appointed Burger as the Assistant Attorney General in charge of the Civil Division of the Justice Department.

In this role, he first argued in front of the Supreme Court. The case involved John P. Peters, a Yale University professor who worked as a consultant to the government. He had been discharged from his position on loyalty grounds. Supreme Court cases are usually argued by the Solicitor General, but he disagreed with the government's position and refused to argue the case. Burger lost the case. Shortly after, in Dalehite v. United States, 346 U.S. 15 (1953), Burger defended the United States against claims from the Texas City ship explosion disaster, successfully arguing that the Federal Tort Claims Act of 1947 did not allow a suit for negligence in policy making.

== Court of Appeals service ==
Burger was nominated by President Dwight D. Eisenhower on January 12, 1956, to a seat on the United States Court of Appeals for the District of Columbia Circuit vacated by Judge Harold M. Stephens. He was confirmed by the United States Senate on March 28, 1956, and received his commission on March 29, 1956. His service terminated on June 23, 1969, due to his elevation to the United States Supreme Court.

== Chief Justice ==
=== Nomination and confirmation ===
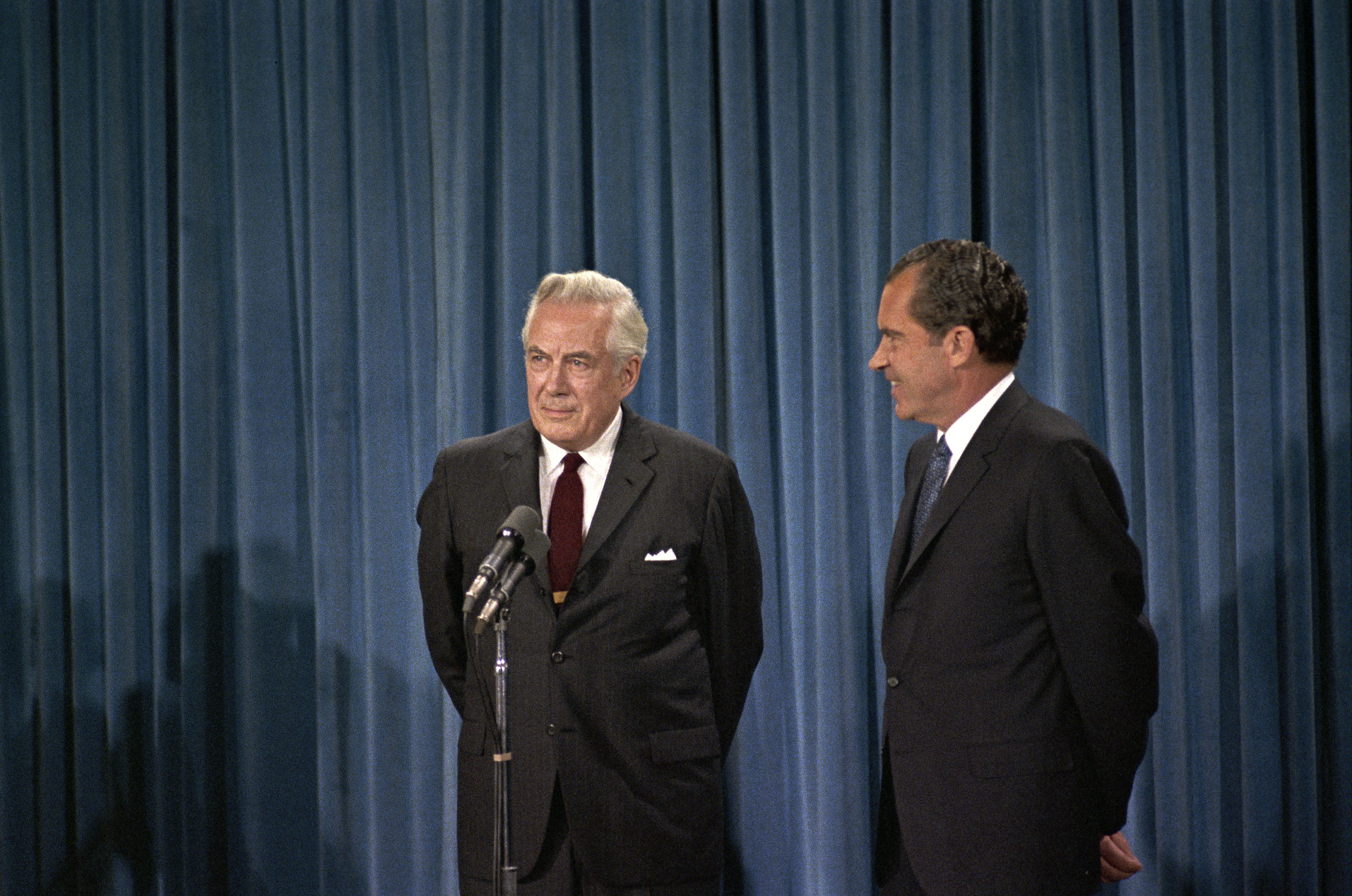
President Richard Nixon introduces Burger as his nominee for the Chief Justice of the Supreme Court.

In June 1968, Chief Justice Earl Warren announced his retirement, effective on the confirmation of his successor. President Lyndon Johnson nominated sitting associate justice Abe Fortas to the position, but a Senate filibuster blocked his confirmation, and Johnson withdrew the nomination. Richard Nixon was elected president in November 1968 and Johnson did not make another nomination before his term as president ended on January 20, 1969.

Burger was nominated by President Nixon to succeed Earl Warren on May 23, 1969. The United States Senate Committee on the Judiciary hearing on Burger's nomination took place on June 3, 1969. It was characterized as having been friendly, and saw Burger as the sole individual to deliver testimony. The hearing was reported as having taken only an hour and forty minutes. Afterwards, the committee held a five-minute private session in which they voted unanimously to report favorably on his nomination. The Senate confirmed Burger to the court by a 74–3 vote on June 9, 1969, and he took the judicial oath of office on June 23, 1969.

Remaking the Supreme Court had been a theme in Nixon's presidential campaign, and he had pledged to appoint a strict constructionist as Chief Justice. Burger had first caught Nixon's eye through a letter of support he sent to Nixon during the 1952 Fund crisis, and then again 15 years later when the magazine U.S. News & World Report reprinted a 1967 speech that Burger had given at Ripon College. In it, Burger compared the United States judicial system to those of Norway, Sweden, and Denmark:

I assume that no one will take issue with me when I say that these North European countries are as enlightened as the United States in the value they place on the individual and on human dignity. [Those countries] do not consider it necessary to use a device like our Fifth Amendment, under which an accused person may not be required to testify. They go swiftly, efficiently and directly to the question of whether the accused is guilty. No nation on earth goes to such lengths or takes such pains to provide safeguards as we do, once an accused person is called before the bar of justice and until his case is completed.

Through speeches like this, Burger became known as a critic of Chief Justice Warren and an advocate of a literal, strict-constructionist reading of the U.S. Constitution. Nixon's agreement with these views, being expressed by a readily confirmable, sitting federal appellate judge, led to the nomination.

According to President Nixon's memoirs, he had asked Burger in the spring of 1970 to be prepared to run for president in 1972 if the political repercussions of the Cambodia invasion were too negative for him to endure. A few years later, Burger was on Nixon's short list of vice presidential candidates following the resignation of Spiro Agnew in October 1973, before Gerald Ford was appointed to succeed him.

=== Jurisprudence ===
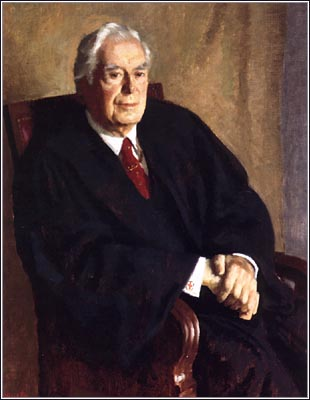
Official portrait of Warren Burger

The Court issued a unanimous ruling, Swann v. Charlotte-Mecklenburg Board of Education (1971), supporting busing to reduce de facto racial segregation in schools. However, Burger wrote the majority opinion for Milliken v. Bradley (1974), which upheld de facto school segregation across school district lines if segregationist policy was not explicitly stated by all of the districts involved. In United States v. U.S. District Court (1972), the Burger Court issued another unanimous ruling against the Nixon administration's desire to invalidate the need for a search warrant and the requirements of the Fourth Amendment in cases of domestic surveillance. Then, only two weeks later in Furman v. Georgia (1972), the Court, in a 5–4 decision, invalidated all death penalty laws then in force although Burger dissented from that decision. In the most controversial ruling of his term, Roe v. Wade (1973), Burger voted with the majority to recognize a broad right to privacy that prohibited states from banning abortions. However, Burger later abandoned Roe in Thornburgh v. American College of Obstetricians and Gynecologists (1986).

On July 24, 1974, Burger led the Court in a unanimous decision in United States v. Nixon, arising from Nixon's attempt to keep several memos and tapes relating to the Watergate scandal private. As documented in Woodward and Armstrong's The Brethren and elsewhere, Burger's original feelings on the case were that Watergate was merely a political battle, and Burger "didn't see what they did wrong". The actual final opinion was largely Brennan's work, but each justice wrote at least a rough draft of a particular section. Burger was originally to vote in favor of Nixon but tactically changed his vote to assign the opinion to himself and to restrain the opinion's rhetoric. Burger's first draft of the opinion wrote that executive privilege could be invoked when it dealt with a "core function" of the presidency and that in some cases, the executive could be supreme. However, the other justices were able to convince Burger to excise that language from the opinion: the judicial branch alone would have the power to determine whether something can be shielded under an assertion of executive privilege.

Burger joined the majority decision in Board of Education of the Hendrick Hudson Central School District v. Rowley, which was the first special education law case decided by the Supreme Court. The Court upheld the constitutionality of Individual Education Plans, but also held that the school district did not have to provide every service necessary in order to maximize a child's potential.

Burger also emphasized the maintenance of checks and balances among the branches of government. In Immigration and Naturalization Service v. Chadha (1983), he held for the majority that Congress could not reserve a legislative veto over executive branch actions.

On issues involving criminal law and procedure, Burger remained reliably conservative. He dissented in Solem v. Helm, which held that a life sentence for a phony check was unconstitutional. He once stated personal opposition to the death penalty in his Furman v. Georgia dissent, but defended it as constitutional.

=== Leadership ===
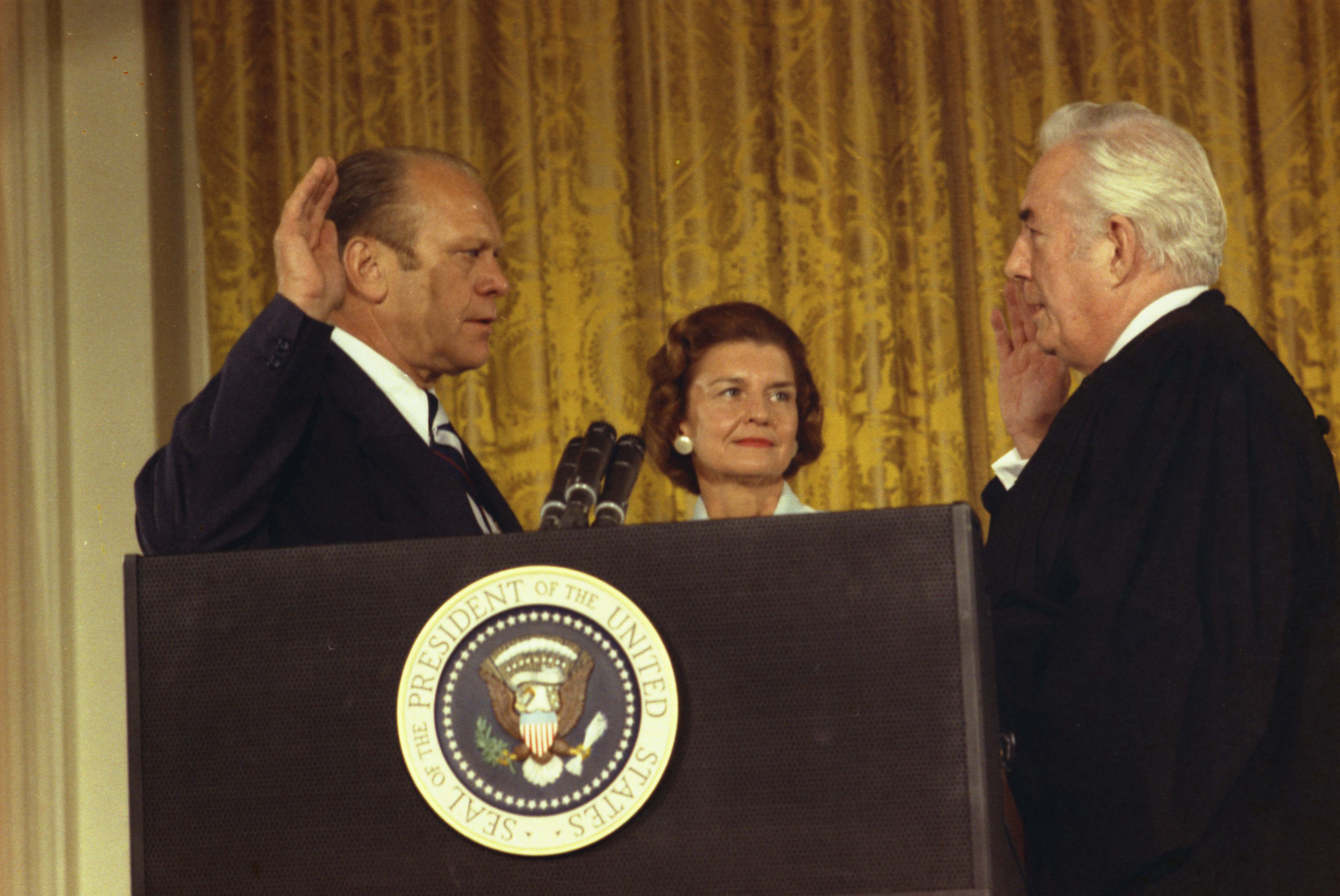
With Betty Ford between them, Chief Justice Burger swears in President Gerald Ford following the resignation of Richard Nixon on August 9, 1974

Rather than dominating the Court, Burger sought to improve administration both within the Court and within the nation's legal system. Criticizing some advocates as unprepared, Burger created training venues for state and local government advocates. He also helped found the National Center for State Courts, which is now in Williamsburg, Virginia, as well as the Institute for Court Management, and National Institute of Corrections to provide professional training for judges, clerks, and prison guards. Burger also began a tradition of annually delivering a State of the Judiciary speech to the American Bar Association, many of whose members had been alienated by the Warren Court. However, some detractors thought his emphasis on the mechanics of the judicial system trivialized the office of chief justice. Despite his reputation for being imperious, he was well-liked by the law clerks and judicial fellows who worked with him.

Burger drew internal controversy within the Supreme Court throughout his tenure, as was revealed in Woodward and Armstrong's The Brethren. Although Sen. Everett Dirksen noted Burger "looked, sounded, and acted like a chief justice," the reporters depicted Burger as an ineffective chief justice who was not seriously respected by his colleagues for his alleged pomposity and lack of legal acumen. Woodward and Armstrong's sources indicated that some of the other justices were annoyed by Burger's practice of switching his vote in conference or simply not announcing his vote so that he could control opinion assignments. "Burger repeatedly irked his colleagues by changing his vote to remain in the majority, and by rewarding his friends with choice assignments and punishing his foes with dreary ones." Burger would also try to influence the course of events in a case by circulating a pre-emptive opinion. Clerks mocked him for his perceived egotism and intense homophobia, and Justice Lewis Powell allegedly referred to him as "the great white doughnut", an attack on both his intellect and physical appearance.

Consequently, the Burger Court was described as his "in name only". Time magazine called him "plodding" and "standoffish" as well as "pompous", "aloof", and unpopular. Burger was a constant irritant on the Court's group dynamic, according to The New York Times' Linda Greenhouse. Jeffrey Toobin wrote in his book The Nine that by the time of his departure in 1986, Burger had alienated all of his colleagues to one degree or another. In particular, Associate Justice Potter Stewart, who had been considered a candidate to succeed Warren as chief justice, was so discontented with Burger that he became the primary source for Woodward and Armstrong when they wrote The Brethren.

Greenhouse pointed to INS v. Chadha as evidence of Burger's "foundering leadership". Burger would cause the case to be delayed for over twenty months although there had been five votes to affirm the appeals court's finding of unconstitutionality after the case had been first argued: Brennan, Marshall, Blackmun, Powell, and Stevens. Burger did not allow an opinion to be assigned, first by asking for a special conference on the case and then by delaying the case for reargument when that conference fell through even though he never held a formal vote on holding the case over for reargument.

=== Views on women judges ===
No women served on the Supreme Court until 1981, and Burger was strongly opposed to giving a seat to a female judge. In 1971, President Nixon considered nominating California state Appellate Judge Mildred Lillie to the Supreme Court. Former White House Counsel John Dean had said that the greatest opposition to Lillie came from Chief Justice Burger. Dean indicated that Burger threatened to resign over the nomination.

=== Views on homosexuality ===
Burger was deeply prejudiced against gay people to an extent which bordered on hysteria. Burger sent Byron White, who wrote the majority opinion in Bowers v. Hardwick upholding laws banning homosexual relations between consenting adults, a letter telling him to condemn homosexuality in his opinion. White refused. When Lewis Powell voted to strike down the anti-gay laws, Burger aggressively lobbied him to change his mind, and sent him a letter so hostile towards homosexuals that Powell mockingly described it as "nonsense". Burger wrote his own concurring opinion attacking homosexuality, quoting a description of it as "an infamous crime against nature, of deeper malignity than rape, and an act not fit to be named, the very mention of which is an affront to human nature", and noted, with apparent approval, that homosexuals were once executed. Burger's language mobilized gay rights advocates to work to overturn sodomy laws, eventually succeeding in the 2003 case Lawrence v. Texas.

== Later life and death ==
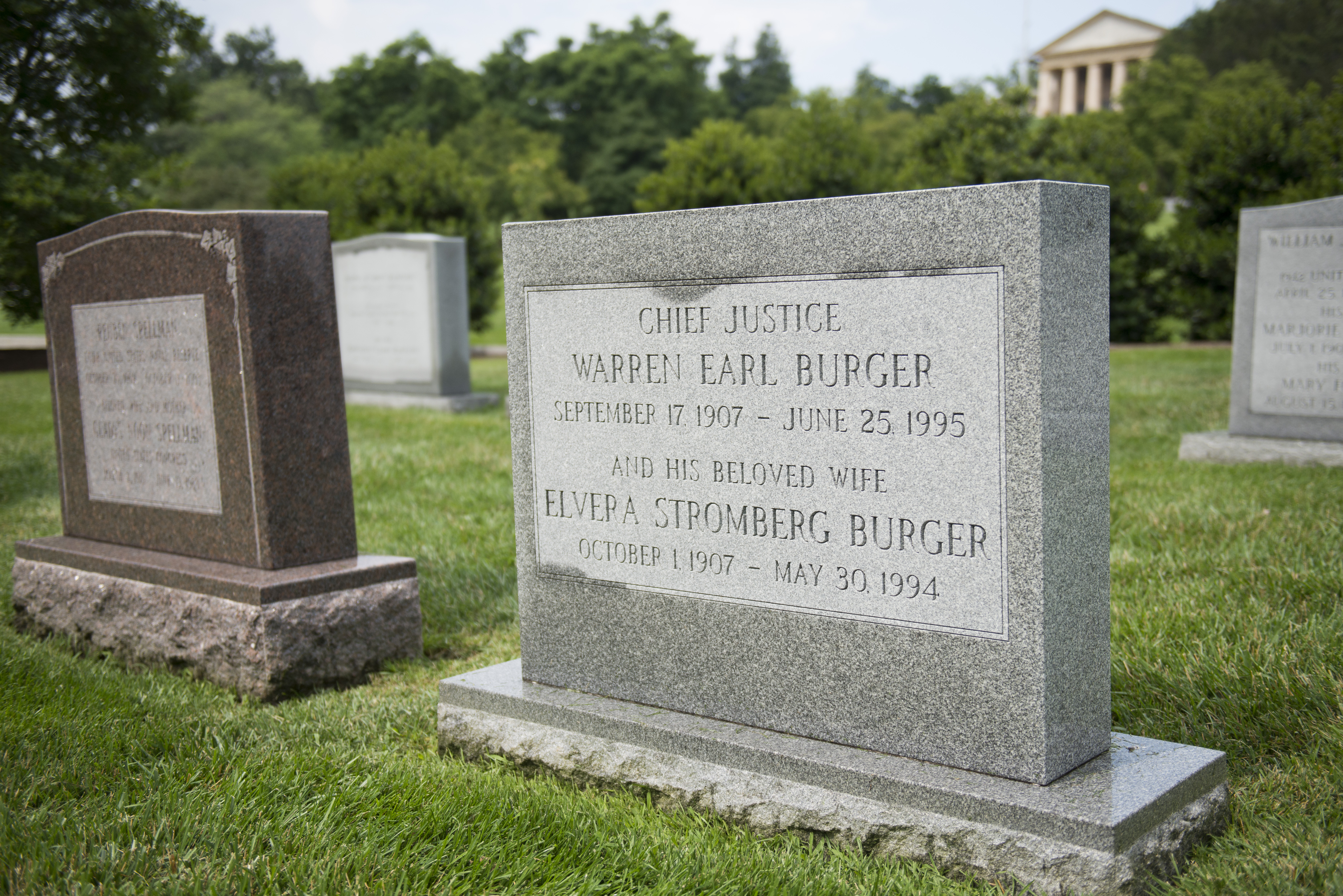
Burger's burial site, next to his wife's, at Arlington National Cemetery

Burger left office on September 26, 1986, in part to lead the campaign to mark the bicentennial of the United States Constitution. He was succeeded as chief justice by William Rehnquist.

In 1987, Princeton University's American Whig-Cliosophic Society awarded Burger the James Madison Award for Distinguished Public Service. In 1988, he was awarded the prestigious United States Military Academy's Sylvanus Thayer Award as well as the Presidential Medal of Freedom.

In a 1991 appearance on the MacNeil/Lehrer NewsHour, Burger stated that the notion that the Second Amendment guaranteed an unlimited individual right to obtain any kind of weapon "has been the subject of one of the greatest pieces of fraud, I repeat the word 'fraud,' on the American public by special interest groups".

On June 25, 1995, Burger died from congestive heart failure at Sibley Memorial Hospital in Washington, at the age of 87. All of his papers were donated to the College of William and Mary, where he had served as Chancellor; however, they will not be open to the public until ten years after the death of Sandra Day O'Connor in 2033-2034, the last surviving member of the Burger Court, per the donor agreement. O'Connor died on December 1, 2023.

Burger's casket lay in repose in the Great Hall of the United States Supreme Court Building. His remains are interred at Arlington National Cemetery.

== Legacy ==
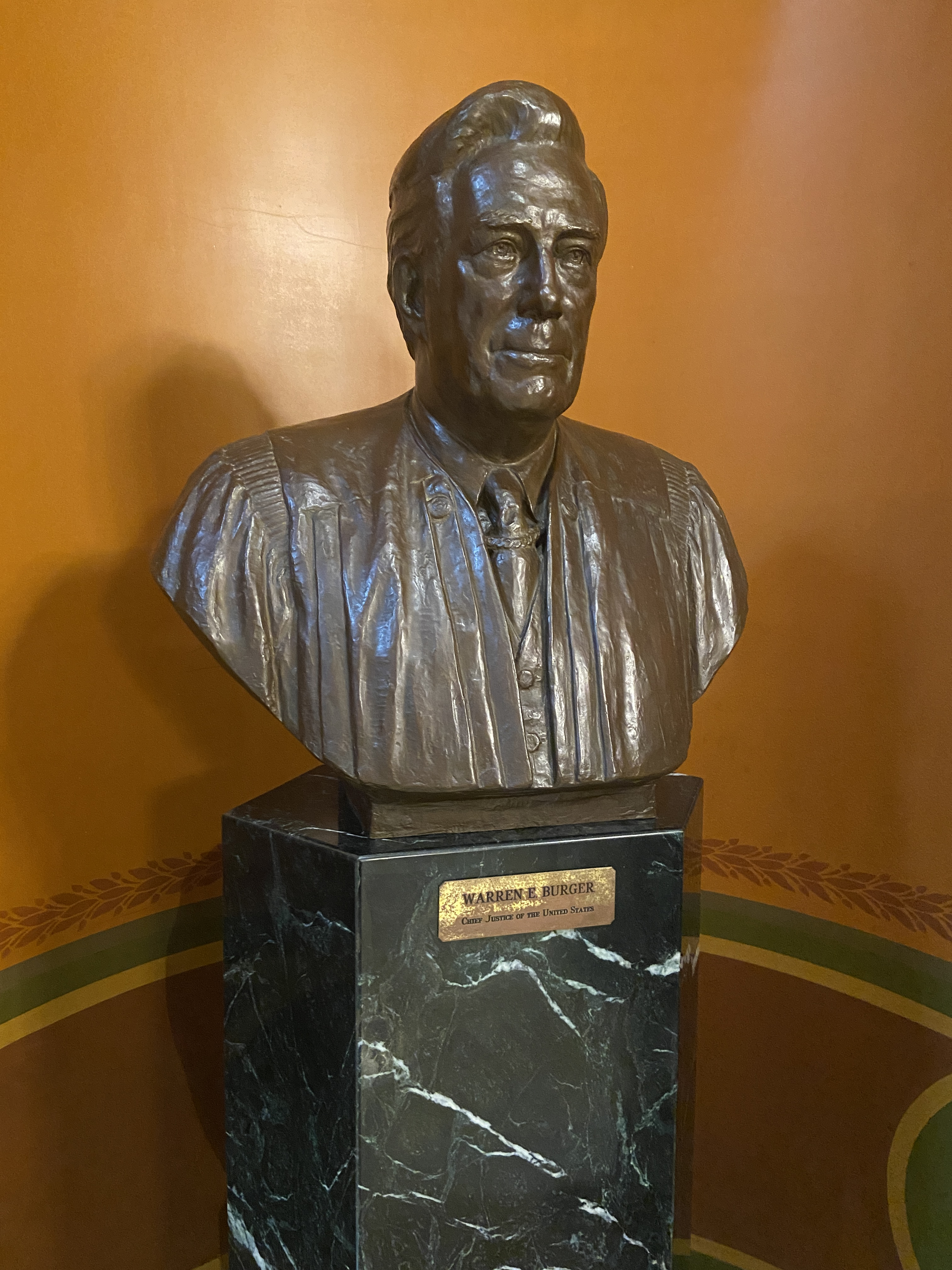
Bust of Warren Burger Minnesota Supreme Court lobby

As chief justice, Burger was instrumental in founding the Supreme Court Historical Society and was its first president. Burger is often cited as one of the foundational proponents of Alternative Dispute Resolution (ADR), particularly in its ability to ameliorate an overloaded justice system. In a speech given in front of the American Bar Association, Chief Justice Burger lamented the state of the justice system in 1984, saying, "Our system is too costly, too painful, too destructive, too inefficient for a truly civilized people. To rely on the adversary process as the principal means of resolving conflicting claims is a mistake that must be corrected." The Warren E. Burger Federal Courthouse in Saint Paul, Minnesota, and the Warren E. Burger Library at his alma mater, the Mitchell Hamline School of Law (formerly the William Mitchell College of Law, and the St. Paul College of Law at the time of Burger's attendance) are named in his honor.

A bust of Burger was placed in the Minnesota State Capitol in 1984.

== Family and personal life ==
He married Elvera Stromberg in 1933. They had two children, Wade Allen Burger (1936–2002) and Margaret Elizabeth Burger (1946–2017). Elvera Burger died at their home in Washington, D.C., on May 30, 1994, at the age of 86.

== See also ==
- Demographics of the Supreme Court of the United States
- List of justices of the Supreme Court of the United States
- List of justices of the Supreme Court of the United States by court composition
- List of law clerks for the chief justice of the United States
- List of United States Supreme Court justices by time in office
- United States Supreme Court cases during the Burger Court

== Sources ==
- Barker, Lucius J. Black Americans and the Burger Court: Implications for the Political System, 1973 Wash. U. L. Q. 747 (1973).
- Eisler, Kim Isaac (1993), A Justice for All: William J. Brennan, Jr., and the Decisions That Transformed America, New York: Simon & Schuster, ISBN 0-671-76787-9
- Greenhouse, Linda. Nixon Appointee Eased Supreme Court Away from Liberal Era, The New York Times, June 26, 1995.
- Greenhouse, Linda (2005), Becoming Justice Blackmun, Times Books, ISBN 0805080570
- Schwartz, Bernard. A History of the Supreme Court Oxford University Press ISBN 978-0-19-509387-2.
- Schwartz, Bernard, ed. The Burger Court: Counter-Revolution or Confirmation? Oxford University Press, 1998 ISBN 0-19-512259-3.
- Woodward, Robert; Armstrong, Scott (1979). The Brethren: Inside the Supreme Court. New York: Simon and Schuster. ISBN 978-0-380-52183-8.

Legal offices
Preceded by Harold Montelle Stephens	Judge of the United States Court of Appeals for the District of Columbia Circuit; 1956–1969	Succeeded by Malcolm Richard Wilkey
Preceded by Earl Warren	Chief Justice of the United States; 1969–1986	Succeeded by William Rehnquist
