= The Final Days (1989 film) =

1989 television film directed by Richard Pearce

- UK DVD cover
- Genre: Drama
- Based on: The Final Days by Bob Woodward & Carl Bernstein
- Teleplay by: Hugh Whitemore
- Directed by: Richard Pearce
- Starring: Lane Smith; Richard Kiley
- Music by: Cliff Eidelman
- Country of origin: United States
- Original language: English

Production
- Executive producer: Stuart Samuels
- Producer: Richard L. O'Connor
- Cinematography: Fred Murphy
- Editor: Bill Yahraus
- Running time: 144 minutes
- Production companies: Poochie Productions; The Samuels Film Co.

Original release
- Network: ABC
- Release: October 29, 1989

The Final Days is a 1989 American television film adaptation of the 1976 book written by Bob Woodward and Carl Bernstein. The film premiered on ABC on October 29, 1989. The film is directed by Richard Pearce and follows the events in the Nixon White House after the Washington Post's Watergate revelations.

== Plot ==
J. Fred Buzhardt inadvertently reveals the existence of a taping system to the Watergate Committee minority counsel. After the committee's majority counsel discovers the information, Alexander Butterfield is interviewed and confirms the taping system's existence.

Four days after the Yom Kippur War, Vice President Spiro Agnew resigns. Nixon turns over the tapes after the resignations of Elliot Richardson and William Ruckelshaus.

Later at his Key Biscayne home, Nixon holds his "I'm not a crook" press conference. James D. St. Clair is hired as Nixon's defense lawyer.

As the walls close in on Nixon, he becomes increasingly erratic. Despite his family's pleas to fight on, he accepts the advice of his advisors and resigns the presidency.

== Featured cast ==
Actor	Role
Newell Alexander	Oliver F. Atkins
Graham Beckel	Ron Ziegler
Diana Bellamy	Rose Mary Woods
Ramon Bieri	John Sirica
Theodore Bikel	Henry Kissinger
Susan Brown	Pat Nixon
James Edgcomb	Alexander Butterfield
Ed Flanders	Leonard Garment
Milo Kevin Floeter	David Eisenhower
Alan Fudge	Gerald Ford
Gregg Henry	John Dean
Ann Hearn	Julie Nixon Eisenhower
Richard Kiley	J. Fred Buzhardt
Elizabeth Norment	Jill Wine-Banks
James Sikking	Elliot Richardson
Gary Sinise	Richard Ben-Veniste
Lane Smith	Richard Nixon
David Ogden Stiers	Alexander Haig
Wayne Tippit	Edward Gurney
Richard Venture	James D. St. Clair
Boris Sichkin	Leonid Brezhnev
George D. Wallace	Archibald Cox
Amanda Wyss	Tricia Nixon Cox

== Awards and nominations ==
=== 1990 Casting Society of America (Artios) ===
- Nominated – Best Casting for TV Movie of the Week: Susan Bluestein

=== 1990 Emmy Awards ===
- Nominated – Outstanding Cinematography for a Miniseries or Movie: Fred Murphy
- Nominated – Outstanding Directing for a Miniseries, Movie or a Dramatic Special: Richard Pearce
- Nominated – Outstanding Made for Television Movie: Stu Samuels, Richard L. O'Connor, Susan Weber-Gold
- Nominated – Outstanding Writing for a Miniseries, Movie Or A Dramatic Special: Hugh Whitemore

=== 1990 Golden Globe Awards ===
- Nominated – Golden Globe Award for Best Actor – Miniseries or Television Film: Lane Smith

== See also ==
- All the President's Men, 1976 film
