= The Final Days =

1976 book by Bob Woodward and Carl Bernstein

- Author: Bob Woodward; Carl Bernstein
- Language: English
- Subject: Richard Nixon, Watergate scandal
- Genre: Political history
- Publisher: Simon & Schuster
- Publication date: May 1976
- Publication place: United States
- Media type: Hardback
- Pages: 476
- ISBN: 0671222988
- Preceded by: All the President's Men (1974)
- Followed by: The Brethren (Woodward, co-author, 1979); Loyalties: A Son's Memoir (Bernstein, 1989)

The Final Days is a 1976 non-fiction book written by Bob Woodward and Carl Bernstein about the Watergate scandal. A follow-up to their 1974 book All the President's Men, The Final Days concerns itself with the final months of the Presidency of Richard Nixon including battles over the Nixon White House tapes and the impeachment process against Richard Nixon.

== Background and writing ==
Not long after the resignation of Richard Nixon in August 1974, Woodward and Bernstein took a leave of absence from The Washington Post in order to begin work on the book. They originally intended to cover just the last hundred days of the Nixon presidency but then expanded it further back. They hired two research assistants, Scott Armstrong and Al Kamen, and among them they interviewed 394 people involved in the tale. People were anxious to talk in an effort to get their (sometimes self-serving) perspective on the events included in the narrative, and almost all of the sources were promised anonymity in return. In this way, Woodward and Bernstein constructed a fly on the wall type narrative of the events in question.

While the book was being written, there were some intimations that it was going to be a "blockbuster" in terms of content, but Woodward demurred, saying instead that it would be "a book of a hundred small surprises."

According to Jon Marshall's 2011 retrospective look at Watergate and the press, although Bernstein got co-equal credit on the cover, he in fact did relatively few interviews and not only less of the writing than Woodward, but also less than either Armstrong or Kamen. (It could also be noted that Woodward wrote the foreword to Marshall's book.)

As noted in the book's foreword, all the information and scenarios depicted were taken from interviews with 394 people who were involved. The content of the interviews was considered on the record, but the identity of the sources remained confidential. Every detail was thoroughly checked, and any information that could not be confirmed by two separate accounts was left out of the book.

In an example of the book's approach, J. Fred Buzhardt co-operated with Woodward and Bernstein during the research for the book, by sitting for eight "extensive" interviews. One person was interviewed as many as 17 times.

== Promotion and the Newsweek excerpts ==
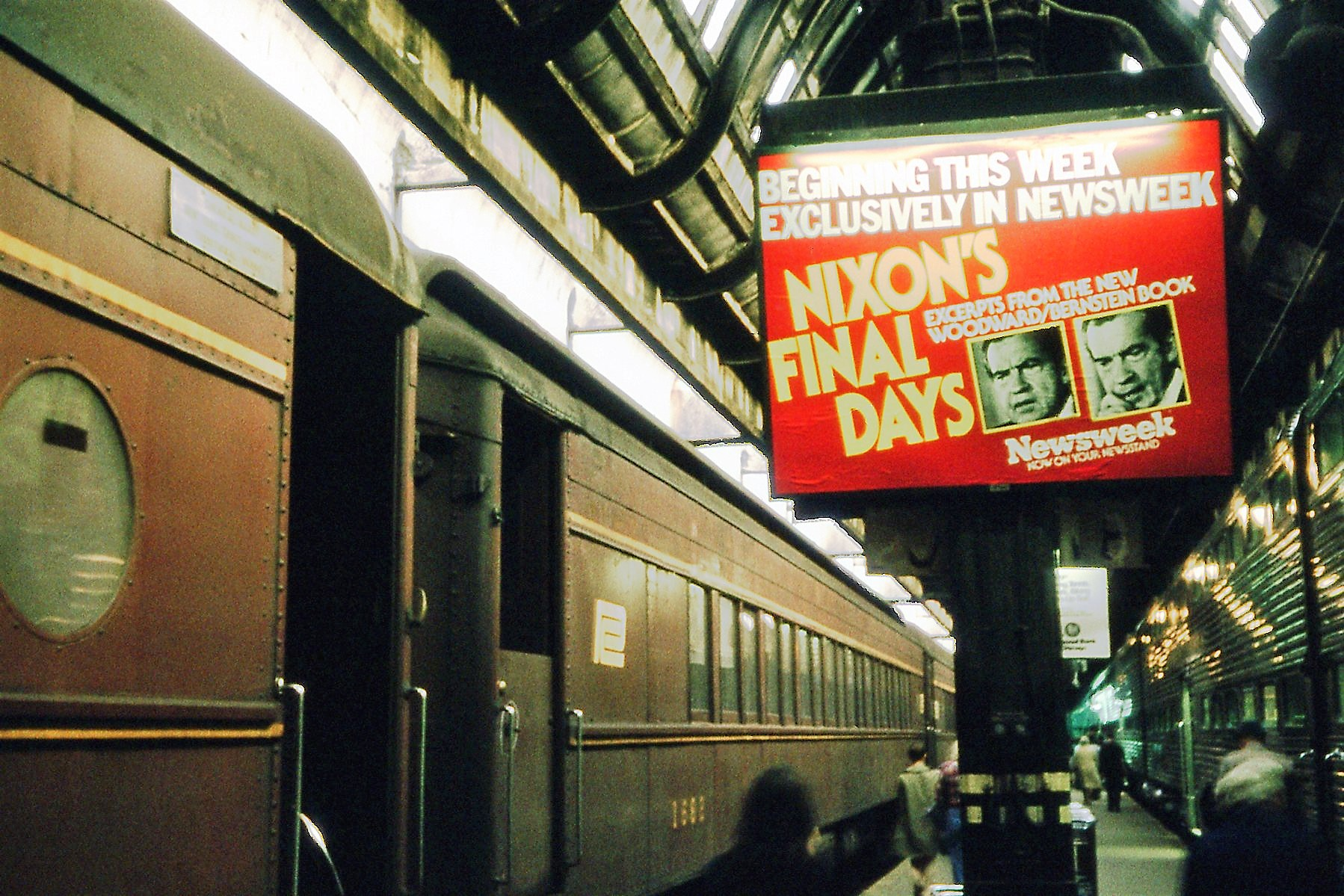
Ad for Newsweek excerpts of "The Final Days" in Chicago Union Station

Release of the book was preceded by the publishing of excerpts in Newsweek magazine, which included a number of the authors' more vivid narrations. (At the time, Newsweek was owned by The Washington Post Company.) At the same time, revelations from these excerpts appeared in many newspaper stories.

Two revelations that caught the most attention regarded Secretary of State Henry Kissinger. One was the disparaging comments about Nixon that Kissinger supposedly made to his staff, such as a reference to "our meatball President." The other, which received even more attention, was a memorable August 7, night-before-resignation-announcement scene with the president, in which a sobbing Nixon asked Kissinger to kneel and pray with him in the Lincoln Sitting Room, with Nixon ending up curled on the floor, beating the carpet with his fist whilst bemoaning his fate. The sensational nature of some of the excerpts brought significant criticism. Other items revealed by the excerpts included Nixon's deteriorating mental state, fears among his sons-in-law that he posed a possible danger to himself, Nixon's strong strain of anti-Semitism, and that the president and First Lady Pat Nixon were estranged and had been for some time.

The promotion was effective: this issue of Newsweek became the fastest selling one in the magazine's history. The debate over these particular incidents colored much of the subsequent reaction to the book.

== Content ==
The book contains two parts, with twenty chapters. The first carries on from where All the President's Men leaves off, in particular from April 30, 1973, when John Dean, the White House counsel, was fired, and brings the narrative through developments of later in 1973 and then up to late July 1974. Part II consists of a day-by-day account of the title-referenced final days, beginning with "Wednesday, July 24" and continuing through "Friday, August 9".

There is also a Cast of Characters at the beginning, starting at Robert Abplanalp and finishing with Ronald L. Ziegler, and a Chronology at the end, running from November 5, 1968 through August 9, 1974. Both are intended to help the reader keep the complex chain of events and people in mind.

As published by Simon & Schuster, the book contained some photographic illustrations and cost $10.95. After it became the fastest selling book in the publisher's history, the price was raised to $11.95, supposedly to defray paper costs and, in the publisher's words, as part of "maintaining priority press time so that [it] can get on press before other books."

== Critical response ==
Reviews of the book focused both on the disclosures within it and the methods by which it was written. Regarding the first, the Los Angeles Times said the book was "Fascinating, macabre, mordant, melancholy, frightening...." Newsweek, which ran the excerpts, described it as "An extraordinary work of reportage on the epic political story of our time."

The book as a whole gave a more balanced, at times sympathetic, portrait of Nixon. The New York Times daily review by Christopher Lehmann-Haupt said that the book was "Unprecedented...[Nixon] emerges from the book as a tragic figure weathering a catastrophic ordeal (of his own making, to be sure, but that is the nature of truly tragic ordeals), and weathering it with considerable courage and dignity." This fuller depiction did much to ameliorate the initial denunciations of the book.

Making reference to the debate swirling around the book, the Times wrote:

But can we believe The Final Days? Are Messrs. Woodward and Bernstein finally credible? All that can be reported here is that the experience of reading the book is credible — that is, the book is artistically believable. After all, as extraordinarily fresh as the whole thing seems, what's new about it consists of comparatively minute details; the framework in which these details are presented we've always known to be true, and we've read about at least a dozen times before. And the details at least seem plausible: it is always reasonably clear from the text who their possible sources could have been; and they always read as if they had been reconstructed from a secondhand point of view.

In a perspective from The New York Times Book Review, author Richard Reeves said that the book "is a spectacular piece of reporting, with all the delights and limitations of journalism." Reeves also expressed concern over the sourcing matter, saying that they should have gotten some of their sources to go on record. All the same he concluded, "Hell, I trust Woodward and Bernstein," saying "not only are they great reporters," but that some of his own findings in researching the first days of the Presidency of Gerald R. Ford had confirmed some of their reporting regarding the last days of the Nixon one.

In a look back from three decades later, The Guardian called the book "a meticulous recreation of the last hundred days of the Nixon presidency." In a 2018 retrospective ranking by Politico of all of Woodward's 20 books, including his newly released Fear, the ranking of The Final Days was second best, trailing only All the President's Men. The Politico writer said of The Final Days that "This book ... is fantastic, the model for all [by Woodward] that came after."

== Commercial response ==
The book was a major commercial success. It became Simon & Schuster's fastest selling book, surpassing by half again the rate of the publisher's previous fastest, 1960's The Rise and Fall of the Third Reich. It debuted atop The New York Times best seller list for the week of April 25, 1976. It stayed in the top spot for 18 weeks, and on the full list for 29 weeks total. Altogether The Final Days sold some 630,000 copies in hardcover.

Paperback rights to the book were in April 1976 sold to Avon Books in a record-setting deal for $1.55 million, eclipsing a previous mark for any publisher for non-fiction works held by The Joy of Cooking.

At the same time, the paperback edition of All the President's Men was atop that bestseller list and the film All the President's Men was the biggest box-office success in the land. All of these successes made both authors wealthy.

== Legacy ==
The book was the last collaboration between Woodward and Bernstein; quite dissimilar in personality, and with different approaches towards their newfound wealth, they soon went their separate ways, although they have remained close friends. In 2005, Bernstein wrote an afterword for Woodward's book The Secret Man: The Story of Watergate's Deep Throat, which detailed Woodward's relationship with FBI Associate Director Mark Felt, the notorious anonymous source known as "Deep Throat" who provided critical information to Woodward during their investigation of Watergate. The pair reunited in 2012 for a Washington Post op-ed column. In it they said that subsequent archival evidence and other historical accounts indicated that in the words of the column's title, "Nixon was far worse than we thought." Making reference to The Final Days, the pair said that their inclusion of anti-Semitic remarks and attitudes by Nixon in the book had been borne out by later revelations. The pair also sat for a joint retrospective '40 years later' interview on their Watergate reporting with CBS in 2014.

In his 1978 memoir RN: The Memoirs of Richard Nixon, the former president gave an account of the famous night-before-resignation-announcement scene that presents it as shorter and more business-like, but allows that his sense of "agony" and "loss" became "most acute" for him that night. Kissinger's 1982 memoir Years of Upheaval calls the Woodward and Bernstein narrative "an unfeeling account" but presents a description of the encounter that is not that far away from theirs. Both Nixon and Kissinger have the encounter starting in the Lincoln Sitting Room but ending in the Lincoln Bedroom.

== In other media ==
In 1989, a television adaptation of the book, also named The Final Days, aired. It starred Lane Smith as Nixon. It was nominated for five Primetime Emmy Awards and one Golden Globe Award.

In the late 1970s, Saturday Night Live featured a recurring sketch parodying some of the scenes described in the book with Dan Aykroyd as Nixon, John Belushi as Kissinger, Chevy Chase as David Eisenhower and Gilda Radner as Julie Nixon Eisenhower.
