= Theodore Moran =

American academic (born 1943)

Theodore ("Ted") Harvey Moran (born 1943) is a professor at Georgetown University and holds the Marcus Wallenberg Chair in the International Business and Finance at the School of Foreign Service within the university.

== Career ==
Moran's research focus teaches and conducts research on international economics, business, foreign affairs, and public policy. As an expert in international business and foreign affairs, Moran has served in a number of governmental and non-governmental advisory roles. Moran served as a senior adviser for economics on the Policy Planning Staff of the Department of State from 1993 to 1994. In 2002 he was chairman of the Committee on Monitoring International Labor Standards of the National Academy of Sciences. Moran served on the US National Intelligence Council on international business issues from 2007 to 2013, resigning after it was revealed Moran was also serving as a role as a paid consultant for Huawei Technologies, the Chinese technology company which the U.S. Government condemned as an espionage threat.

== Iran Memo ==
Some of Moran's earliest work as an economist was as a desk officer on the State Department's foreign policy planning staff for President Carter's administration. During this time, Moran advocated for an approach to Iranian foreign policy that countered the beliefs of senior State Department officials and presidential advisors (including Zbigniew Brzezinski), but would prove prescient after the proceedings of the Iranian Revolution.

In a memo dated Nov. 2, 1977 Moran predicted the upheaval of Shah of Iran, Mohammad Reza Pahlavi, due to mismanagement of domestic spending that favored large military spending drawn from public funds. In this memo he stated Iran “will face rising social and economic tensions unless it reorients government spending" and have “insufficient financial resources to head off mounting political dissatisfaction, including discontent among those groups that have traditionally been the bedrock of support for the monarchy.”

"... We both have a common interest in moderating and modulating the Iranian military buildup, not because this administration wants to yield to congressmen who do not like the shah, not because the United States is unable to trust Iran with our most sophisticated weapons but because we have a national interest in insuring the stable and robust evolution of a strong and dependable ally."

"We do not want to simply deny the shah particular pieces of military equipment (and have him feel hurt, or turn elsewhere). Rather we want him to slow down and stretch out the buildup of his military forces to give him more time and more resources to build a cohesive, prosperous (and non-repressive) domestic base for his defense effort."

Despite the wide circulation of this memo and extensive effort to elevate Moran's analysis to those who could affect policy change, the United States continued along a path that favored appeasing Iranian weapons purchases to secure American military interests in the region. Over the following years, protests of the Shah's regime grew more fervent, culminating in the massacre of protestors on Sep. 8, 1978, now known as Black Friday, and widely considered as the tipping point in the Iranian Revolution.

Moran was somewhat vindicated after details of his memo became public as part of a series of articles in the Washington Post by Scott Armstrong detailing the US' involvement in the demise of the Shah.

== Books ==
- Outward Foreign Direct Investment and US Exports, Jobs, and R&D: Implications for US Policy (2013)
- Foreign Direct Investment in the United States: Benefits, Suspicions, and Risks with Special Attention to FDI from China (2013)
- Foreign Direct Investment and Development: Launching a Second Generation of Policy Research: Avoiding the Mistakes of the First, Reevaluating Policies for Developed and Developing Countries (2011)
- China's Strategy to Secure Natural Resources: Risks, Dangers, and Opportunities (2010)
- Three Threats: An Analytical Framework for the CFIUS Process (2009)
- Harnessing Foreign Direct Investment for Development: Policies for Developed and Developing Countries (Center for Global Development, 2006)
- Does Foreign Direct Investment Promote Development? (coedited with Magnus Blomstrom and Edward Graham, 2005)
- International Political Risk Management: Exploring New Frontiers (World Bank, 2005)
- Beyond Sweatshops: Foreign Direct Investment, Globalization, and Developing Countries (Brookings Institution, 2002)
- Foreign Investment and Development (1998)
- Parental Supervision: A New Paradigm for Foreign Direct Investment and Development (Policy Analyses in International Economics, 1998)
