= Marco Politi =

Italian journalist

Marco Politi (born January 29, 1947, in Rome) is an Italian journalist and writer, specializing in Vatican news and politics.

== Biography ==
Editorialist of Fatto Quotidiano, Politi has dealt with Vatican-related and religious issues since 1971. After working at Il Messaggero, between 1987 and 1993 he was Moscow correspondent for La Repubblica; in that period he founded the association of foreign correspondents of the USSR, of which he was twice president. From 1993 to 2009 he was vaticanista of Scalfari's newspaper.

He collaborates regularly with ABC, CNN, BBC and other international networks. Author of numerous investigations, in the two conclaves of 1978 he identified, through a series of interviews with cardinal-electors, the identikit of the "pastor pope", destined to characterize the profile of Karol Wojtyla. With Pulitzer Prize winner Carl Bernstein he wrote a bestselling biography of John Paul II, published in numerous countries in Europe and the Americas. In an exclusive interview with the Prefect of the Congregation for the Doctrine of the Faith, Joseph Ratzinger, published in La Repubblica on November 19, 2004, he had identified the German cardinal as a candidate for the papacy.

The transmission ABC News Special Event", of which he was an expert on the election of John Paul II's successor, won the 2006 Alfred I.duPont-Columbia University award for information on the 2005 conclave.

He has followed John Paul II and Benedict XVI on more than eighty trips around the world. His book Joseph Ratzinger. Crisi di un papato, Laterza (2011) illustrated the blind alley in which the Catholic Church had arrived, prefiguring Benedict XVI's retirement a year in advance.

In April 2012, the Catholic Theological Faculty of the University of Münster, where Joseph Ratzinger had been a professor, invited him to give a lecture on the theme: "A Pope in the crisis". With his latest work, Francesco tra i lupi. Il segreto di una rivoluzione (Laterza 2014), he highlighted the existence of strong opposition to the reforms of Pope Francis from both Vatican curia and the bishops' conferences, as well as from the Mafia.

During his career Marco Politi has been deputy secretary of the Italian National Press Federation, working in the eighties for the contractualization of journalists of free radios. Upon his return from Moscow, he was repeatedly elected national councillor and president of the Legal Commission of the Order of Journalists.

== Bibliography ==
- Sua Santità, with Carl Bernstein, Rizzoli, 1996 (published in English as His Holiness: John Paul II and the History of Our Time)
- La confessione. Un prete gay racconta la sua storia, Editori Riuniti, 2000,
- Il ritorno di Dio. Viaggio tra i cattolici d'Italia, Mondadori, 2004, Giornalismo
- Io, prete gay, Mondadori, 2006
- Papa Wojtyla. L'addio, Morcelliana, 2007,
- La Chiesa del no. Indagine sugli italiani e la libertà di coscienza, Mondadori, 2009
- Joseph Ratzinger. Crisi di un papato, Laterza, 2011,
- Francesco tra i lupi. Il segreto di una rivoluzione, Laterza, 2014,
- La solitudine di Francesco: un papa profetico, una Chiesa in tempesta, Laterza, 2019,
- Francesco, la Peste, la Rinascita, Laterza, 2020.
