= Alfred Bernstein =

American civil rights activist (1911–2003)

- Born: Alfred David Bernstein; April 9, 1911; New York City, U.S.
- Died: February 28, 2003 (aged 91); Washington, D.C., U.S.
- Education: Columbia University
- Occupation: Civil rights activist
- Known for: Role in UFWA and UPWA unions
- Spouse: Sylvia Walker
- Children: 3 (including Carl Bernstein)

Alfred David Bernstein (April 9, 1911 – February 28, 2003) was an American civil rights and union activist.

== Background ==
Alfred David Bernstein was born on April 9, 1911, in New York City. He obtained two degrees from Columbia University, including a degree from Columbia University Law School.

== Career ==
In 1937, he moved to Washington, D.C. where he worked as an investigator for inquiry by the Senate Commerce Committee (AKA Senate Railroad Investigating Committee AKA Wheeler Committee) into the railroad industry then under scrutiny. ("I wasn't always on the payroll of the committee itself, but I always was attached to it," he later said.) While conducting investigations, he observed how poorly government workers, especially blacks, were treated. In 1941, he took a six-week leave of absence to help prepare a wage case for the Brotherhood of Railroad Trainmen. In 1942, he joined the Office of Price Administration (OPA) based in San Francisco as investigator. In 1943, he served two years in the United States Army Air Forces in the Pacific theater of World War II.

Around November 1945, Bernstein became director of negotiations for the United Public Workers of America (UPWA) until July 1951, shortly before he appeared under subpoena before Congress. He was an active opponent of Harry S. Truman's Executive Order No. 9835 which required a loyalty oath "designed to root out communist influence in the U.S. federal government" and testified against it before the United States House Committee on Education and Labor and was subsequently called by a Senate subcommittee to defend his own loyalty.

Later, Bernstein served as a fundraiser for the Eleanor Roosevelt Institute for Cancer Research and the Union of Hebrew Congregations before joining the National Conference of Christians and Jews in 1960 where he served until 1985 as vice president for development.

== Union and civil rights activism ==
From 1937 to 1950, Bernstein served as an official in the United Federal Workers of America (after its 1946 merger, known as the United Public Workers of America).

In the 1940s, he and his wife were members of the Communist party and, according to his son, Carl Bernstein, were persecuted by the US federal government.

In 1947, Bernstein testified about a strike against the GSI. (On January 26–28 and February 2, 1948, a hearing of the House Education and Labor Subcommittee, chaired by U.S. Representative Clare E. Hoffman, occurred on the topic of a strike by United Cafeteria and Restaurant Workers (Local 471) and its parent, the United Public Workers of America (UPWA), CIO, against Government Services, Inc. (GSI), which had already lasted nearly a month. Hoffman refused to let UPWA head Abram Flaxer read a statement and asked questions including whether Flaxer was a communist. One of his UAW attorneys, Nathan R. Witt, objected to "abuse of congressional power." When Forer rose to follow on from Witt, Hoffman asked him, "Are you the same Forer who defended Gerhard Eisler?" When Witt objected to Hoffman's question, it led Hoffman to eject Witt from the hearing. On January 26, 1948, Bernstein charged that House committee agents had raided the union's offices. During January, William S. Tyson, solicitor for the Labor Department, and Robert N. Denham, general counsel for the National Labor Relations Board, both agreed that nothing in the Taft-Hartley Act prohibited GSI from bargaining with a non-complying union. However, Denham added, the Act intended to "eliminate Communist influence from unions by denying to such unions the services of NLRB.")

On October 11, 1951, during testimony before the Senate Subcommittee on Internal Security (SSIS), Bernstein refused to answer many questions regarding the UPWA, the Communist Party, and people including Abram Flaxer, Louise Bransten, and Grigory Kheifets.

== Personal life and death ==
Bernstein was married to civil rights activist Sylvia Walker Bernstein. The couple had three children: journalist Carl Bernstein, Mary Bernstein, and Laura Bernstein.

Alfred Bernstein died age 91 on February 28, 2003, of a stroke at his home in Washington, D.C.

== See also ==
- Loyalties, a memoir by Carl Bernstein on his parents' life during the McCarthy era
