= Loyalties (memoir) =

1989 memoir by Carl Bernstein

Loyalties: A Son's Memoir
- Cover of the first edition
- Author: Carl Bernstein
- Language: English
- Subject: McCarthyism
- Genre: Memoir
- Publisher: Simon & Schuster
- Publication date: March 1989
- Publication place: United States
- Media type: Print (hardcover and paperback)
- Pages: 262
- ISBN: 0671649426

Loyalties: A Son's Memoir is a memoir by journalist Carl Bernstein, published in 1989. The book is an account of his family's experience during the McCarthy era in the 1940s and 1950s. Bernstein's parents Sylvia and Alfred, both members of the American Communist Party, were called to testify before the House Un-American Activities Committee (HUAC) and the Senate Subcommittee on Internal Security in the 1950s and were under FBI surveillance for four decades.

== Background ==
Bernstein began working on Loyalties in 1977. He had just published The Final Days, his second book about the Watergate scandal written with Bob Woodward, and had resigned from The Washington Post. Bernstein had initially approached long-time New Yorker editor William Shawn to write a piece about his family during the McCarthy era but then received a $400,000 advance from Simon & Schuster to write a book, initially to be titled Progressive People. In 1978, he conducted several extended interviews of his parents, who were hostile to the project. According to New York magazine, "Thirty years after rebuilding their shattered lives, the Bernsteins had no desire to dig up the shards and lacerate themselves again. Their days of living like fugitives were long over". During that time, Bernstein also filed Freedom of Information Act (FOIA) requests to obtain the file the FBI had compiled about his family over the course of four decades. Bernstein struggled to write the book and shelved the project in 1980. Following well-publicized personal and career struggles and spurred on by the counsel of writer Joan Didion, he returned to the book in 1984. In 1986, Bernstein signed a new $1 million contract with Simon & Schuster for two books. He finished writing Loyalties in January 1988 and spent another year editing it.

== Content ==
Loyalties recounts Bernstein's family's life in the 1940s and 1950s, during which his parents' left-wing activism and involvement in the labor movement brought them under heavy scrutiny from the FBI and the United States Congress. His father, Alfred Bernstein, served as an official in the United Federal Workers of America (after its 1946 merger, known as the United Public Workers of America) from 1937 to 1950. In 1947, President Harry S. Truman signed Executive Order 9835, which created 150 loyalty boards to investigate federal employees and to dismiss those found to be disloyal to the U.S. government. The Attorney General's office also compiled lists of "subversive organizations", which included many non-communist left-leaning institutions, and prior involvement with these could be grounds for investigation. Alfred Bernstein served as defense counsel in around 500 loyalty board cases, winning, according to his son, 80% of them.

During interviews with their son, Sylvia and Alfred Bernstein admitted to having joined the American Communist Party in 1942, although they said that they had been largely inactive members and that they stopped attending party meetings after 1947. Throughout the book, Bernstein discusses his parents' ambivalence towards the party and the impact that their membership and activism had on him and the rest of his family. The revelation of the Bernsteins' Communist Party membership shocked some because even FBI Director J. Edgar Hoover had been unable to prove that Bernstein's parents had been party members.

Bernstein's FOIA requests led to his discovery that the FBI had compiled a 2,500-page file about his parents, starting in 1938. The bureau tracked his parents' daily movements and activities, including their son's bar mitzvah, as well as those of their friends and colleagues in the progressive movement. Multiple anonymous informants told the FBI that the Bernsteins were members of the Communist Party, leading Alfred to be called to testify before the Senate Subcommittee on Internal Security in 1951, while Sylvia was called to testify before the House Un-American Activities Committee (HUAC) in 1954.

During the writing of Loyalties, Bernstein interviewed Clark Clifford, Truman's White House Counsel from 1946 to 1950. Clifford admitted to Bernstein that there had been no serious threat of communist infiltration of the federal government and that the Truman administration's loyalty program was created to fend off accusations from the Republican Party of being "soft" on communism.

== Reception ==
Loyalties received mixed to positive reviews. Publishers Weekly called it a "pained, loving, intensely felt account of his parents' ordeal, and his own emotional upheaval, during President Harry Truman's loyalty purges". The Chicago Tribune said Loyalties was a "touching and remarkable book". The Buffalo News wrote, "This story... involves much more than either Bernstein's professional rehabilitation or his parents' nightmare. On a larger scale, the book, much like Watergate, reveals the dark side of American democracy... Bernstein, through his reporting skill, manages to bring everything together with painful exhilaration."

In a mixed review for The Washington Post, Martin Duberman wrote, "As valuable as Carl Bernstein's story is in reminding us of the terrible human toll of the McCarthy years, and in personalizing it through the experiences of his own parents, his book falls uncomfortably between impersonal history and personal recollection. In the end, the history is too shallow and fragmentary, the recollections too tame and episodic." The New York Times gave Loyalties a similarly mixed assessment, praising Bernstein's retelling of childhood memories and his portrait of the Washington Jewish community but criticizing his historical and political analysis. In the Los Angeles Times, historian Eric Foner said that "Loyalties fails both as autobiography and as political analysis" but praised Bernstein for "[driving] home a truly subversive idea: Rather than a nest of spies, the Communist Party was an integral and honorable part of the American radical tradition."
