= Carl Bernstein =

American journalist (born 1944)

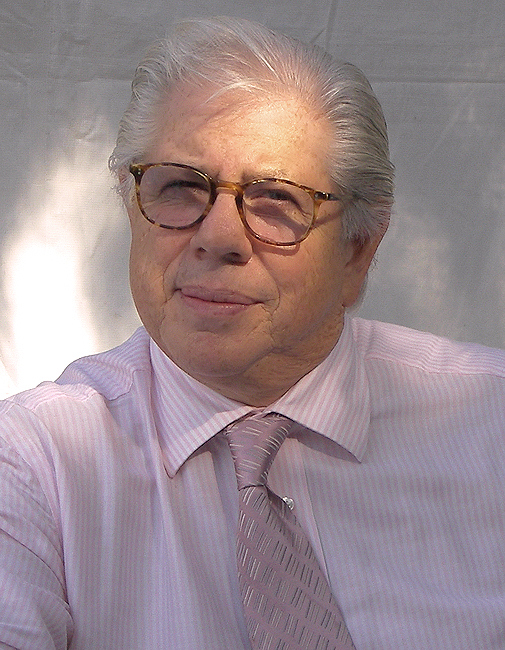
- Bernstein in 2007
- Born: Carl Milton Bernstein; February 14, 1944 (age 82); Washington, D.C., U.S.
- Occupations: Journalist, author
- Employer: Vanity Fair
- Known for: Reporting on Watergate scandal
- Spouses: Carol Honsa (m. 1968; div. 1972) Nora Ephron (m. 1976; div. 1980) Christine Kuehbeck (after 2003)
- Children: 2
- Parent(s): Alfred Bernstein; Sylvia Walker

Carl Milton Bernstein (/ˈbɜːrnstiːn/ BURN-steen; born February 14, 1944) is an American investigative journalist and author. While a young reporter for The Washington Post in 1972, Bernstein was teamed up with Bob Woodward, and the two did much of the original news reporting on the Watergate scandal. These scandals led to numerous government investigations and the eventual resignation of President Richard Nixon. The work of Woodward and Bernstein was called "maybe the single greatest reporting effort of all time" by long-time journalism figure Gene Roberts.

Bernstein's career since Watergate has continued to focus on the theme of the use and abuse of power via books and magazine articles. He has also done reporting for television and opinion commentary. He is the author or co-author of six books: All the President's Men (1974) and The Final Days (1976), both with Bob Woodward; Loyalties: A Son's Memoir (1989); His Holiness: John Paul II and the History of Our Time (1996) with Marco Politi; A Woman in Charge: The Life of Hillary Rodham Clinton (2007); and Chasing History: A Kid in the Newsroom (2022), a memoir of his early years in journalism. Additionally, he is a regular political commentator on CNN.

== Early life and career ==
Bernstein was born to a secular Jewish family in Washington, D.C. He was the son of Sylvia (née Walker) and Alfred Bernstein. Both his parents were civil-rights activists and members of the Communist Party USA in the 1940s. He attended Montgomery Blair High School in Silver Spring, Maryland, where he worked as circulation and exchange manager for the school's newspaper Silver Chips. He began his journalism career at the age of 16 when he became a copyboy for The Washington Star and moved "quickly through the ranks". The Star, however, unofficially required a college degree to write for the paper.

At the University of Maryland, College Park, he was a reporter for the school's independent daily, The Diamondback. However, Bernstein was dismissed from the university after the fall 1964 semester for bad grades.

In 1965, Bernstein left the Star to become a full-time reporter for the Elizabeth Daily Journal in New Jersey. While there, he won first prize in New Jersey's press association for investigative reporting, feature writing, and news on a deadline. In 1966, Bernstein left New Jersey and began reporting for The Washington Post, where he covered every aspect of local news and became known as one of the paper's best writing stylists.

== Watergate ==
On a Saturday in June 1972, Bernstein was assigned, along with Bob Woodward, to cover a break-in at the Watergate office complex that had occurred earlier the same morning. Five burglars had been caught red-handed in the complex, where the Democratic National Committee had its headquarters; four of them turned out to be ex-CIA agents who did security work for the Republicans. In the series of stories that followed, Bernstein and Woodward eventually connected the burglars to a massive slush fund and a corrupt attorney general. Bernstein was the first to suspect that President Nixon was involved, and he found a laundered $25,000 check that linked Nixon to the burglary. Bernstein and Woodward's discoveries led to further investigations of Nixon, and on August 9, 1974, amid hearings by the House Judiciary Committee, Nixon resigned to avoid facing impeachment.

In 1974, two years after the Watergate burglary and two months before Nixon resigned, Bernstein and Woodward released the book All the President's Men. The book drew upon the notes and research accumulated while writing articles about the scandal for the Post and "remained on best-seller lists for six months". In 1975, it was turned into a movie starring Dustin Hoffman as Bernstein and Robert Redford as Woodward which later went on to be nominated in multiple Oscar (including Best Picture nomination), Golden Globe and BAFTA categories. A second book, The Final Days, was published by Bernstein and Woodward in 1976 as a follow-up chronicling Nixon's last days in office.

== After Watergate ==
Bernstein left the Post in 1977 and expanded into other areas due to his reputation from the Watergate reporting. He joined broadcast news in a high growth period. He worked at ABC, CNN, and CBS as a political commentator, and was a spokesman in various television commercials. He began investigating the secret cooperation between the CIA and American media during the Cold War. He spent a year in his research, which was published as a 25,000-word article in Rolling Stone magazine.

He then began working for ABC News. Between 1980 and 1984, Bernstein was the network's Washington Bureau Chief and then a senior correspondent. In 1982, for ABC's Nightline, Bernstein was the first to report during the Israeli invasion of Lebanon that Ariel Sharon had "deceived the cabinet about the real intention of the operation—to drive the Palestinians out of Lebanon, not (as he had claimed) to merely establish a 25-kilometer security zone north from the border".

Two years after leaving ABC News, Bernstein released the book Loyalties: A Son's Memoir, in which he revealed that his parents had been members of the Communist Party of America. The assertion shocked some because even J. Edgar Hoover had tried and been unable to prove that Bernstein's parents had been party members.

In 1992, for Time, Bernstein wrote a cover story publicizing the alliance between Pope John Paul II and President Ronald Reagan. Later, along with Vatican expert Marco Politi, he published a papal biography entitled His Holiness. Bernstein wrote in the 1996 book that the Pope's role in supporting Solidarity in his native Poland, and his geopolitical dexterity combined with enormous spiritual influence, was a principal factor in the downfall of communism in Europe.

In 1992, Bernstein wrote a cover story for The New Republic magazine indicting modern journalism for its sensationalism and celebration of gossip over real news. The article was entitled "The Idiot Culture".

Bernstein's biography of Hillary Rodham Clinton, A Woman in Charge: The Life of Hillary Rodham Clinton, was published by Alfred A. Knopf on June 5, 2007. Knopf had a first printing of 275,000 copies. It appeared on The New York Times Best Seller list for three weeks. A CBS News end-of-year survey of publishing "hits and misses" included A Woman in Charge in the "miss" category and implied that its total sales were somewhere in the range of perhaps 55,000–65,000 copies.

Bernstein is a frequent guest and analyst on television news programs, and in 2011 wrote articles for Newsweek/The Daily Beast, comparing Rupert Murdoch's News of the World phone-hacking scandal to Watergate.

In 2012, Carl Bernstein spoke at a rally of the People's Mojahedin Organization of Iran, saying he attended as an advocate "who believes in basic human rights" and that "the evil, the terrorism, the real terrorism, is in the heart of Tehran, not in this room".

On CNN in 2024, Bernstein reported that President Biden had 15 to 20 incidents of cognitive decline in early 2024, increasing media calls for Biden to drop out before he did shortly after.

== Personal life ==
Bernstein has been married three times, first to a fellow reporter at The Washington Post, Carol Honsa; then to writer and director Nora Ephron from 1976 to 1980; and since 2003 to the former model Christine Kuehbeck.

During his marriage to Ephron, Bernstein met Margaret Jay, daughter of British Prime Minister James Callaghan and wife of Peter Jay, then UK ambassador to the United States. They had a much-publicized extramarital relationship in 1979. Margaret later became a government minister in her own right. Bernstein and second wife Ephron already had an infant son, Jacob, and she was pregnant with their second son, Max, in 1979 when she learned of her husband's affair with Jay. Ephron delivered Max prematurely after finding out. Ephron was inspired by the events to write the 1983 novel Heartburn, which was made into a 1986 film starring Meryl Streep and Jack Nicholson.

While single, in the 1980s, Bernstein became known for dating Bianca Jagger, Martha Stewart, and Elizabeth Taylor, among others.

== Portrayals ==
Bernstein was portrayed by Dustin Hoffman in the film version of All the President's Men and by Bruce McCulloch in the 1999 comedy film Dick. In Nora Ephron's Heartburn, a 1986 semi-autobiographical comedy/drama, Jack Nicholson played Mark Forman, a character based on Carl Bernstein.

== Differences between Bernstein and Woodward ==
Although they worked together to report the Watergate scandal to the world, Bernstein and Woodward had very different personalities. Raised in a traditional Republican household, Woodward was very well-educated and has been described as gentle. After graduating from Yale University, he joined The Washington Post; nine months later, he was assigned the Watergate break-in story. On the other hand, Bernstein was born to a Communist Jewish family. He was rebellious, which led to him failing out of college. He was ten months further along in his career than Woodward when the scandal broke out.

They were also different in work styles. Woodward's strength was in investigation, so he focused on investigating the Watergate scandal. He met his Deep Throat source secretly to get as much information as possible. His writing was serious and matter-of-fact. However, Bernstein was the first of the pair to think that the Watergate case could be related to President Richard Nixon. Compared to Woodward, Bernstein was a strong writer, and therefore wrote articles based on Woodward's information from Deep Throat. Due to their different styles, other journalists described them as a perfect team. Alicia Shepard said, "Carl was the big thinker, and Woodward was the one that [made] sure it got done ... [T]hey knew that each of them had strengths that the other didn't, and they relied on one another."

== Bibliography ==
- All the President's Men (1974) ISBN 0-671-21781-X; written with Bob Woodward
- The Final Days (1976) ISBN 0-671-22298-8; written with Bob Woodward
- Loyalties: A Son's Memoir (1989) ISBN 0671649426
- His Holiness: John Paul II and the History of Our Time (1996) ISBN 0385472374; written with Marco Politi
- A Woman in Charge: The Life of Hillary Rodham Clinton (2007) ISBN 978-0-307-38855-1
- Chasing History: A Kid in the Newsroom (2022) ISBN 978-1-627-79150-2
