= Sylvia Bernstein (activist) =

American civil rights activist (1915–2003)

- Born: Sylvia Walker; November 6, 1915
- Died: November 23, 2003 (aged 88); Washington, D.C., U.S.
- Education: George Washington University
- Occupation: Civil rights activist
- Spouse: Alfred Bernstein
- Children: 3, including Carl Bernstein

Sylvia Bernstein (née Walker; November 6, 1915 – November 23, 2003) was an American civil rights activist.

== Background ==
Sylvia Walker was born on November 6, 1915, to Jewish immigrants from Russia. She attended Central High School and George Washington University.

== Career ==
In the 1930s, she worked as secretary for the War Department. In the 1940s, she and her husband were members of the Communist party; as a result, according to their son, Carl Bernstein, they were persecuted by the government. When asked by congressional panels about her party involvement, Bernstein invoked her Fifth Amendment rights against self-incrimination. In 1962, she worked as a statistician with Resources for the Future, an economic think tank. From 1964 to 1989, she worked in the gift department at Garfinckel's. She then worked for the Bill Clinton administration where she answered the correspondence of first lady Hillary Rodham Clinton. She was an active Democratic party member and was a member of Women Strike for Peace protesting nuclear weapons and the Vietnam War. She helped to desegregate District eateries, the Glen Echo amusement park and public swimming pools and playgrounds. She also campaigned on behalf of Julius and Ethel Rosenberg, who were executed in 1953 for espionage.

== Personal life and death ==
Walker was married to Alfred Bernstein, a union activist. They had three children: journalist Carl Bernstein, Mary Bernstein, and Laura Bernstein.

Sylvia Bernstein died aged 88 on November 23, 2003, in Washington, D.C.

== See also ==
- Loyalties, a memoir by Carl Bernstein on his parents' life during the McCarthy era
