= The Brethren: Inside the Supreme Court =

1979 book by Bob Woodward and Scott Armstrong

- First edition
- Author: Bob Woodward and Scott Armstrong
- Language: English
- Subject: Supreme Court of the United States
- Publisher: Simon & Schuster
- Publication date: 1979
- Publication place: United States
- Pages: 467
- ISBN: 978-0-671-24110-0
- OCLC: 61201839

The Brethren: Inside the Supreme Court is a 1979 book by Bob Woodward and Scott Armstrong. It gives a "behind-the-scenes" account of the United States Supreme Court during Warren Burger's early years as Chief Justice of the United States. The book covers the years from the 1969 term through the 1975 term. Using Woodward's trademark writing technique involving "off-the-record" sources, the book provides an account of the deliberations leading to some of the court's more controversial decisions from the 1970s. The book significantly focused on the Supreme Court's unanimous 1974 decision in United States v. Nixon, which ruled that President Richard Nixon was legally obligated to turn over the Watergate tapes. In 1985, upon the death of Associate Justice Potter Stewart, Woodward disclosed that Stewart had been the primary source for The Brethren.

The book begins with the 1969 retirement of Chief Justice Earl Warren from the Supreme Court after the U.S. Senate refused to allow President Lyndon Johnson to elevate sitting Associate Justice Abe Fortas to Chief Justice in 1968. Newly inaugurated as president, Richard Nixon considered nominating moderate Justice Potter Stewart, but ends up selecting Judge Warren Burger. Upon Burger's successful confirmation, the Republican Party begins pursuing reversals of liberal Warren Court decisions. John Marshall Harlan II comprised the more conservative side of the court, often joined by Byron White, while William Douglas, William Brennan and Thurgood Marshall took up the left. Serving as the narrator, Potter Stewart was portrayed as the Supreme Court's ideological center alongside Hugo Black.

Over the course of the book, Woodward and Armstrong portray the nominations of six additional justices, including the Senate's rejection of Clement Haynsworth and G. Harrold Carswell as successors to Abe Fortas. The replacement of Hugo Black and John Marshall Harlan II with Lewis F. Powell Jr. and William Rehnquist reinforces the Burger Court's conservatism, and the book ends with William Douglas suffering a stroke at the end of 1974, allowing Gerald Ford to appoint John Paul Stevens as his successor. While Douglas despised Ford over a 1970 attempt to impeach him, Stevens would ultimately lead the court's liberal bloc.

Warren Burger is described by others as pompous, devious, and intellectually mediocre. The book is also critical of William Douglas, who is portrayed as having gone from one of America's greatest jurists to a "nasty, petulant, prodigal child" who was overly political. Woodward and Armstrong also take aim at another liberal icon, Thurgood Marshall, describing him as intellectually lazy and apathetic — a characterization that legal scholar Mark Tushnet noted as being laden with racial connotations. The accuracy of the book was questioned by some of the Justices, particularly Brennan, who privately called it a "goddamn shit sheet."

In his 2026 memoir Secrets, Woodward revealed that Justices Blackmun, Powell, Rehnquist, Stewart, and White had all spoken to him or Armstrong.

== Specific criticism ==
In the 1972 baseball anti-trust case Flood v. Kuhn, Justice Harry Blackmun circulated a first draft listing more than 70 baseball greats to illustrate the role of baseball in American society. Armstrong and Woodward claimed that he included no African-American players until prodded to do so by Justice Thurgood Marshall. However, when the papers of Justice William O. Douglas were opened to the public in 1986, the names Jackie Robinson, Roy Campanella, and Satchel Page were already included in Justice Blackmun's 1st draft.

Regarding the 1972 case Moore v. Illinois, Armstrong and Woodward claimed that Justice William Brennan did not vote in favor of giving a man a new trial because he was trying to build Justice Harry Blackmun's confidence and independence from Chief Justice Warren Burger, potentially winning Blackmun's votes on other cases. Legal writer Anthony Lewis has since argued that this casual "vote swapping" did not happen based on interviews with Supreme Court clerks.

== Reception ==
In a review, educator Gene Nichol argued that the book's claims of law clerks overseeing most of the writing showcased a bias from sourcing the history of key cases from these clerks. Nichol similarly criticized the book for its overly negatively portrayal of Warren Burger as the result of law clerks biased against conservative jurisprudence after recent decades of liberal decisions. Furthermore, Nichol felt that the book's excessive focus on the personal lives of Supreme Court justices led it to improperly ignore the ethical issues surrounding Warren Burger and William Rehnquist.
