= Sylvia Bernstein (artist) =

American painter

Sylvia Bernstein (1914–1990) was an American painter.

Her work is included in the collections of the Brooklyn Museum and the Whitney Museum of American Art.
