= Scott Armstrong (journalist) =

American journalist, writer, and media consultant

- Occupations: Journalist, author, media consultant
- Employer: The Washington Post (former)
- Known for: Founder of National Security Archive; Staff member of Senate Watergate Committee
- Notable work: The Brethren (1979)

Scott Armstrong is an American journalist, author, and media consultant. He is the current director of Information Trust, a former journalist for The Washington Post, and founder of the National Security Archive. He was a staff member of the Senate Watergate Committee.

With Bob Woodward, he co-authored the 1979 book The Brethren, an inside account of the United States Supreme Court. Before that he was research assistant with Woodward on the latter's co-authored 1976 endeavor The Final Days.

== Works ==
- Scott Armstrong and Bob Woodward, The Brethren: Inside the Supreme Court, (New York: Simon & Schuster, 1979).
- Scott Armstrong, Malcolm Byrne, and Tom Blanton, The Chronology: The Documented Day-by-Day account of the Secret Military Assistance to Iran and the Contras, (New York: Warner Books, 1987).
- Scott Armstrong and Paul Grier, Strategic Defense Initiative: Splendid Defense or Pipe Dream?, (New York: Foreign Policy Association, 1986).
