= Clio's Psyche =

Academic journal

Clio’s Psyche: Understanding the “Why” of Culture, Current Events, History, and Society is an academic peer-reviewed journal established in 1994 by Professor Paul H. Elovitz of the Psychohistory Forum (1982–) to further the innovative, all encompassing, interdisciplinary field of psychohistory, utilizing the tools of applied psychoanalysis, history, psychobiography, clinical psychology, political psychology, philosophy, and related disciplines.

Clio's Psyche's (ISSN 1080-2622) mission is to nurture psychohistorical scholarship, to disseminate psychohistorical knowledge in non-technical language, to stimulate transdisciplinary thought, and to encourage academicians, clinicians, students, and lay public to research the "why's" of history - personal, group, and societal.

Initially, it started as a newsletter and before long became a full length, double-blind refereed journal, one of several in the field. Its website is at cliospsyche.org. Clio's Psyche produces three or four issues a year, as well as interviews and memorials, all of which are available for readers online under an open access license.

== Clio's Psyche's Editors and Editorial Board ==
=== Editors ===
- Paul H. Elovitz, Editor-in-Chief
- Inna Rozentsvit, Associate Editor

==== Editorial Board ====
- C. Fred Alford, PhD University of Maryland
- James William Anderson, PhD Northwestern University
- David R. Beisel, PhD RCC-SUNY
- Donald L. Carveth, PhD York University
- Marilyn Charles, PhD Austen Riggs Center
- Lawrence J. Friedman, PhD Harvard University
- Ken Fuchsman, EdD University of Connecticut
- Peter Loewenberg, PhD UCLA
- Denis O’Keefe, PhD New York University
- Peter W. Petschauer, PhD Appalachian State University
- Vamık Volkan, MD University of Virginia

Clio's Psyche has become one of the leading journals in the field of psychological history. Publication is both in print and online. Every year Clio's Psyche publishes 3-4 issues, with additional special issues and "The Best of Clio's Psyche" publications. There have been numerous special issues and features, symposia and festschrifts honoring psychohistorians Robert Jay Lifton, Peter Loewenberg, Vamik Volkan, and others. A major other activity has been to interview over sixty contributors to psychohistorical knowledge.

It also publishes detailed biographical memorials of deceased colleagues. The background of the authors it publishes incline to be as follows: academics from many disciplines, clinicians from many different backgrounds, and laypeople interested in pursuing the life of the min. Submissions deemed suitable by the editors are refereed by scholars in a double blind system.

Clio's academic authors come from various universities and colleges: Brandeis, Brown, Harvard, Helsinki, Princeton, Rutgers, UConn, Texas, Wesleyan, Williams, Yale, and UCLA. In recent decades, there are more clinicians from diverse backgrounds (medicine, psychology, psychotherapy, dentistry, sport medicine) are involved in writing for Clio's Psyche.

== See also ==
- Psychohistory Forum
- Journal of Psychohistory
- Psychobiography
