= Paul H. Elovitz =

- Occupations: Historian, psychohistorian, psychoanalyst

Academic background
- Education: University of Connecticut; Rutgers University

Academic work
- Institutions: Temple University; Ramapo College of New Jersey; Object Relations Institute for Psychotherapy and Psychoanalysis
- Main interests: Psychohistory, psychobiography, psychological study of political leadership
- Notable works: The Making of Psychohistory (2018)

Paul H. Elovitz is an American historian, psychohistorian, and psychobiographer who was a founding faculty member of Ramapo College of New Jersey. His research includes the history and methodology of psychohistory, psychobiography, and the psychological study of political leadership, particularly American presidents and presidential candidates.

Elovitz co-founded the Psychohistory Forum in 1982 and Clio's Psyche in 1994, and was a founding member and later president of the International Psychohistorical Association. He is the author of The Making of Psychohistory: Origins, Controversies, and Pioneering Contributors (Routledge, 2018).

Elovitz trained in psychoanalysis and was designated a Research Psychoanalyst by the New Jersey Institute for Psychoanalysis in 2019. Since 2020, he has taught postgraduate courses in psychohistory and psychobiography at the Object Relations Institute.

== Contributions to psychohistory ==
Elovitz joined the psychohistory movement in the 1970s. He was a founding member of the International Psychohistorical Association and later served as its president.

From the mid-1970s into the early 1980s, he convened the Saturday Workshops of the Institute for Psychohistory. In 1982, he and Henry Lawton founded the Psychohistory Forum as a separate scholarly organization.

In 1994, Elovitz founded Clio's Psyche, a psychohistory journal and related psychological approaches to history, culture, biography, and society, and became its editor-in-chief. His 2014 chapter, "The Successes and Obstacles to the Interdisciplinary Marriage of Psychology and History," appeared in Cristian Tileagă and Jovan Byford's Cambridge University Press volume Psychology and History: Interdisciplinary Explorations.

In 2021, Elovitz edited The Many Roads of the Builders of Psychohistory, a collection of essays in which psychohistorians describe how they entered the field.

Elovitz has written about the methodological limitations of psychohistory. In The Making of Psychohistory, he argues that psychological assumptions are often implicit in historical interpretation and that psychohistorical work should make those assumptions explicit and subject them to disciplined inquiry. He has also criticized speculative psychobiography and the use of psychiatric diagnosis of historical figures as a substitute for sustained historical research.

Elovitz also co-edited Immigrant Experiences: Personal Narrative and Psychological Analysis with Charlotte Kahn.

In 2023, Elovitz contributed "My Psychoanalytic Psychobiography and Methodology" to the Springer volume Beyond WEIRD: Psychobiography in Times of Transcultural and Transdisciplinary Perspectives. The volume addresses the extension of psychobiographical research beyond predominantly Western subjects and frameworks.

== Psychobiography and presidential studies ==
He has written about American presidents since the 1970s, with a citation that supports the date. His work examines political leadership through developmental history, personality, motivation, and relationships.

His contributions to Politics and Psychology: Contemporary Psychodynamic Perspectives included "George Bush: From Wimp to President," co-authored with Glen Jeansonne, and "Presidents Carter and Sadat: The Repudiation of the Peacemakers," co-authored with Mohamed Shalaan.

In 2003, he contributed "Psychoanalytic Scholarship on the American Presidency" to James William Anderson and Jerome A. Winer's edited volume Psychoanalysis and History.

Elovitz later examined Donald Trump and Joe Biden in "How Paul Elovitz Used What He Learned about Childhood, Leadership, Listening, and Personality to Become a Presidential Psychobiographer of Trump and Biden," published in Psychoanalytic Inquiry in 2021 and subsequently included in the Routledge volume Leadership, Psychoanalysis, and Society.

In their prologue to the 2021 Psychoanalytic Inquiry issue, Michael Maccoby and Mauricio Cortina describe Elovitz as a psychohistorian and student of American presidential personality. They note that his essay follows Trump and Biden from childhood to the presidency.

== The Making of Psychohistory ==
Elovitz's The Making of Psychohistory: Origins, Controversies, and Pioneering Contributors was published by Routledge in 2018. The book traces the emergence and development of psychohistory and discusses figures and debates involved in the organized field, while also drawing on Elovitz's experience as a participant in it.

Michael Rustin reviewed it in Psychodynamic Practice in 2019.

In History and the Unconscious, historian Tomasz Pawelec discusses The Making of Psychohistory in relation to the historiography and methodology of psychohistory.

== Selected works ==
- The Making of Psychohistory: Origins, Controversies, and Pioneering Contributors. London and New York: Routledge, 2018. ISBN 978-1-138-58749-6.
- The Many Roads of the Builders of Psychohistory (editor). New York: ORI Academic Press, 2021. ISBN 978-1-942431-17-6.
- Immigrant Experiences: Personal Narrative and Psychological Analysis (co-edited with Charlotte Kahn). Madison, New Jersey: Fairleigh Dickinson University Press, 1997.
- "Psychoanalytic Scholarship on the American Presidency." In James William Anderson and Jerome A. Winer, eds., Psychoanalysis and History. The Analytic Press, 2003.
- "The Successes and Obstacles to the Interdisciplinary Marriage of Psychology and History." In Cristian Tileagă and Jovan Byford, eds., Psychology and History: Interdisciplinary Explorations. Cambridge University Press, 2014, pp. 83–108.
- "How Paul Elovitz Used What He Learned about Childhood, Leadership, Listening, and Personality to Become a Presidential Psychobiographer of Trump and Biden." Psychoanalytic Inquiry, 41(7), 2021, pp. 527–539.
- "How Paul Elovitz Used What He Learned about Childhood, Leadership, Listening, and Personality to Become a Presidential Psychobiographer of Trump and Biden." In Michael Maccoby and Mauricio Cortina, eds., Leadership, Psychoanalysis, and Society. Routledge, 2022.
- "My Psychoanalytic Psychobiography and Methodology." In Claude-Hélène Mayer, Roelf van Niekerk, Paul J. P. Fouché, and Joseph G. Ponterotto, eds., Beyond WEIRD: Psychobiography in Times of Transcultural and Transdisciplinary Perspectives. Springer, 2023, pp. 313–328.

== See also ==
- Psychohistory
- Psychobiography
- Clio's Psyche
- International Psychohistorical Association
- Psychohistory Forum
