= Leadership analysis =

Leadership analysis is the act of breaking down a leader into basic psychological components for study and use by academics and practitioners. Good leadership analysis is not reductionist, but rather takes into consideration the overall person in the context of the times, society and culture from which they come. Leadership analysis is traditionally housed in political psychology departments and utilizes the tools of psychology to achieve political ends by exploiting the psyche in the case of practitioners, or to gain knowledge about the building blocks of leadership and individuals in the case of academics. The distinction between the two is not made frivolously; in fact, while academics and practitioners both engage in the overarching act of analyzing leaders, they go about it quite differently. Applied analysts make great use of the psychobiography, while academics tend to analyze transcriptions in search of traits and character clues.

== Applied analysis ==
In keeping with the goals of psychology (describe, explain, predict, control), a psychobiography is first a description of an individual's life, an explanation or analysis in psychological terms of how the events shaped the individual, and an if/then predictor (if conducting an applied analysis) of the actions the individual might take if given the right situation, leaving the control/change up to the policy-maker requesting the analysis. An if/then predictor is used because no analyst will be able to know the environment that acts upon the individual to the extent of proper analysis. One of the most influential government analysts is Jerrold Post, founder of CIA's Center for the Analysis of Personality and Political Behavior. Post's analytical paradigm is below. His background, like many of the earliest applied analysts, was in psychiatry, which utilizes qualitative methods for analysis.

Important theorists in psychobiography include Gordon Allport, Alfred Adler, Erik Erikson, Sigmund Freud, Urie Bronfenbrenner, Carl Jung, Albert Bandura, John Bowlby.

These methods focus primarily psychoanalytic, personality, and developmental theories including the influence of role models, early experiences, heroes and mentors, as well as ego defenses (known more commonly as defense mechanisms), personality types, belief systems, information processing styles, and cognitive factors. The important thing to note about leadership analysis is the consistency of the individual's belief systems, rather than small fluctuations.

Personality types (and personality disorders) play a large part in aiding with analysis, as they are often associated with specific cognitive beliefs and processes. For example, extreme narcissists lack empathy, conscience, and will do anything to accomplish personal goals. Lack of accomplishment is usually taken extremely badly and narcissists have low self-esteem. Narcissists have trouble learning from others because they know everything. Leaders who are narcissists make their people give great shows affirming their righteous leadership, demand praise from others, and employ “yes men”, or sycophants.

Other common personality types of leaders are obsessive-compulsive, which makes for a hardworking leader with great organizational skills, but also one afraid to make decisions for fear of making a mistake, excessively contentious, and lacking in social grace, and the paranoid; a hypersensitive, easily slighted leader who see the world as full of enemies and will rarely negotiate. Paranoid leaders fall prey to projecting their beliefs (ego defense) on those around them and are therefore largely autonomous and independent. Their enemies are always coordinated and rational actors intent on the paranoid's destruction.

In line with developmental psychology, life stages are a particularly important part of analysis, especially during the mid-thirties (when most leaders of coups emerge), or in old age, when leaders, especially narcissists, feel the reins of power slipping and either try to consolidate power, as did Deng Xiaoping, or give it up, as did Charles de Gaulle.

=== Psychobiographic outline ===
Part 1: Psychobiographic Discussion: The Development of the Individual in the Context of the Nation's History (use parallel time lines with one indicating key events in the life of the subject, the second indicating key events in the nation's history. By moving these lines parallel, a visual representation is created of the impact of historical events on individual development)

1. Cultural and historical background. Describe constraints of the political culture on the role of the leader
2. Family origins and early years
  1. Family constellations- grandparents, parents, siblings; relationships- family politics
  2. Heroes and models
3. Education and Socialization
  1. Climate in country
  2. Student years, examples of leadership
4. Professional career
  1. Mentors
  2. Early career
  3. Successes and failures
5. The subject as leader
  1. Key events
  2. Crises
  3. Key political relationships, influences
6. Family and friends

Part II: Personality

1. General personal description
  1. Appearance and personal characteristics (include description of lifestyle, work/personal life balance, working hours, hobbies, recreation)
  2. Health (include energy level, drinking, drug use)
2. Intellectual capacity and style
  1. Intelligence
  2. Judgment
  3. Knowledge
  4. Cognitive complexity
3. Emotional reactions
  1. Moods, mood variability
  2. Impulse and impulse control
4. Drives and character structure
  1. Identify personality types (if possible)
  2. Psychodynamics
    1. Self-concept/self-esteem
    2. Basic identification
    3. Neurotic conflicts
  3. Reality (sense of/testing/adaption to)
  4. Ego defense mechanisms
  5. Conscience and scruples
  6. Psychological drives, needs, motives (discriminate to degree possible among drive for power, for achievement, for affiliation)
  7. Motivation for seeking leadership role (to wield power, to occupy seat of power, to achieve place in history)
5. Interpersonal relationships
  1. Identify key relationships and characterize nature of relationships
    1. Inner circle, including unofficial advisors "kitchen cabinet"
    2. Superiors
    3. Political subordinates
    4. Political allies, domestic and international
    5. Political rivalries, international adversaries

Part III. Worldview

1. Perceptions of political reality (include cultural influences/biases)
2. Core beliefs (include concept of leadership, power)
3. Political philosophy, ideology, goals, and policy views (domestic, foreign, and economic policy views and view of U.S. Include discussion of which issues most interest the leader, in which issue areas his or her experience lies, and which issues are particularly salient for the leader's political psychology). Note that not all leaders have a core political philosophy or body of governing political ideas.
4. Nationalism and identification with country

Part IV. Leadership System

1. General characteristics (include discussion of the role expectations- both general public and elite- placed on the individual, emphasizing the leader's political and cultural determinants and skill in fulfilling them)
  1. How subject defines his or her role
  2. Relationship with public
  3. Oratorical skill and rhetoric
2. Strategy and tactics- goal-directed behavior
3. Decision making and decision implementation style
  1. Strategic decision making
  2. Crisis decision making
  3. How does leader use staff/inner circle? Does the leader vet decisions or use them only for information? How collegial? Does the leader surround himself or herself with sycophants or choose strong self-confident subordinates?
  4. Dealing with formal and informal negotiating style

Part V. Outlook

1. Note particularly political behavior closely related to personality issues. Relate personality to key issues, emphasizing in which direction the psychological factors point. Estimate drives, values, and characteristics that are the most influential.
2. Attempt to predict how the individual will interact with other political figures, including opposition leaders and other key foreign leaders

== Academic analysis ==
In contrast to applied analysts, academic analysts generally come from the fields of social psychology and political science and take a quantitative methodology when conducting analysis, usually consisting in part of trait theory (openness, contentiousness, extroversion, etc.) and/or character study (central to individual's functioning, observable, stable patterns of behavior, present across circumstances). In addition, quantitative measures such as verbal styles, grammatical choices, and scales for achievement, affiliation, and power provide room for analysis.

=== Verbal categories ===
Sources that are analyzed for verbal styles are general public data that has been cross-checked, legitimized, and filtered for representation of the individual as much as possible. Verbal style is preferred to be off the cuff, both to ensure lack of third party input and to put the individual in what is deemed a stressful situation.

Verbal categories include qualifiers (“I believe”), retractors (“but”, “nevertheless”), I/We, me, negatives (“nothing”, “never”, “not”), explainers (“because” “therefore”), feeling expressions (“I like”), direct references (“your question”), nonpersonal references (“Jack Kennedy was a friend of mine”), and expressions. The scores are based on occurrences/1000 words.

=== Motivation assessments ===
Leadership analyses can also come in the form of motivation assessments, where achievement, affiliation, and power are deemed the three fundamental dimensions. Achievement motivation, the concern for excellence, is often manifested in the leader claiming to do “good” or “better”. High achievers delay gratification, have high but achievable expectations, and are innovative. These leaders are rational calculators pursuing self-interest. Affiliation motivation, the concern for close relations with others, is manifested by statements of togetherness and common pursuits. Affiliation leaders form ideological circles and rely on friends, rather than experts, when formulating decisions. They work harder with people who share their ideologies and are aggressive towards people who are different or new. Affiliate leaders will rebel against those they believe are being exploitive, and perceptions of friends and enemies is important. They may appear erratic and unstable and are not adept and working with or managing people they don't know or like. Power motivation portrays the leader and the leader's group as the mover and shaker of events. Power motives with a sense of self-control, responsibility, and altruism leads to successful managers who create high-morale atmospheres, are visible and well-known (and liked). Power motives without self-censorship are prone to fall victim to ingratiation and flattery and will take extreme risks with little thought to moral considerations. Unchecked power motives create impulsive behavior and combined with stress, leads to lower immune functions, vulnerability to cardiovascular problems, and infectious diseases.

Studies have shown that countries heading to war will increase power language while decreasing affiliation language. Country documents with high achievement scores generally have stronger economies with greater numbers of entrepreneurs and higher levels of economic development.

=== Trait assessment ===
Seven other traits are used for assessing leadership style. The belief that one can influence or control what happens (locus of control), the need for power and influence, conceptual complexity (ability to differentiate between people and things in an environment), self-confidence, and motivations (problem solving/relationships), general distrust or suspicion, in-group bias. Scoring is done per mention per speech and compared with other leaders being studied. When the first trait, belief in influence, is scored high, these leaders generally get their way and have a way forward. Low scores indicate a belief in constraints, but also in consensus building and compromise. High scores in this trait but low in power motivation will not be able to manipulate as well and will not achieve all they want to do.

=== Conceptual complexity ===
Conceptual complexity and levels of self-confidence make up a self-other orientation, which analyses the level of openness the individual is to input from others. Higher complexity than self-confidence mean more likely to take input, showing a concern for others and are successful at seeing the whole picture and dealing with situations on a case-by-case basis. The reverse situation (higher self-confidence) shows a leader who view the world as they wish to perceive it and use coercion to ensure their views become their follower's views. Low in both is an individual who mirrors the group that elected them and tends to exhibit narcissistic tendencies.

Self-confidence scores are judged on the use of the words, I, me, myself, and mine. Scores are calculated by average percentage over the course of several speeches. Again, high self-confidence forms a filter with which the individual creates their world-view, low self-confidence turns the individual into a mouth for a cause. Contextual complexity (degree of differentiation) forecasts leaders either seeing multiple paths through situations (high) or absolutist terms (low).

=== Motivation assessment ===
The continuum of motivations spans from relationships (group maintenance) to problem solving. Coding is done through word choice, where words like accomplish(ment), achieve(ment), plan, position, proposal, recommend(ation), and tactic signify problem solving and words like appreciation, amnesty, collaboration, disappoint(ment), forgive(ness), harm, liberation, and suffering indicate group maintenance. Scoring is done of one in proportion to the other. The directed psychobiography in this case would only include categories of topics discussed in speeches, audience, events and tenure, and any significance in changes of speech patterns/traits.

=== Operational coding ===
Another way to conduct a leadership analysis is through operational coding. Operational coding analysis is the study of political leaders that closely focus on set of political beliefs and their cultural context. There are ten questions that should be answered:

Philosophy

1. What is the “essential” nature of political life? Is the political universe essentially one of harmony or conflict? What is the fundamental character of one's political opponents?
2. What are the prospects for the eventual realization of one's fundamental values and aspirations? Can one be optimistic, or must one be pessimistic on this score; and in what respects the one and/or the other?
3. Is the political future predictable? In what sense and to what extent?
4. How much “control” or “mastery” can one have over historical development? What is one's role in “moving” and “shaping” history in the desired direction?
5. What is the role of “chance” in human affairs and in historical development?

Instrumental

1. What is the best approach for selecting goals or objectives for political action?
2. How are the goals of action pursued most effectively?
3. How are the risks of political action calculated, controlled, and accepted?
4. What is the best “timing” of action to advance one's interests?
5. What are the utility and role of different means for advancing one's interests?

Answering these questions will give the nature of the belief system, which can then be categorized into six types (A-F) regarding the opinions of the nature of conflict. A, B, and C believe that conflict is temporary, caused by individual misperceptions (A), pathological societal institutions (B), or anarchical organizations of the international system (C). D, E, and F believe that conflict is permanent, caused by the individual (D), society (E), or the international system (F). Type A's motivation is affiliation, which DEF are power motives. B and C shared achievement, but differed in power (B) and affiliation (C).

A system of analysis of operational coding is the psycholinguistic VICS (Verbs in Context System), a system for reviewing belief patterns in speeches in public statements and making inferences about behavior from those beliefs. Subject, verb category, domain of politics, tense of verb, intended target, and context are all scored with + or – points according to the table:

1. Identify the subject: Self or Other
2. Identify the tense of the transitive verb: past, present, future
  1. Identify the category of the verb +/-
3. Words
  1. Appeal, support (+1) Oppose, resist (-1)
  2. Promise benefits (+2) Threaten costs (-2)
4. Deeds
  1. Rewards (+3) Punishments (-3)
5. Identify domain: Domestic or Foreign
6. Identify target and place in context

Scoring (after weighting based on same verb categories and multiplying by frequency measures)- these can be applied to any of the operational coding questions:

Nature of Universe (for Philosophy):

Hostile		Friendly
Extremely	Mixed	Extremely
-1.0	0.0	+1.0

Direction of Strategy (Instrumental):

Conflict		Cooperation
Extremely	Mixed	Extremely
-1.0	0.0	+1.0

== Examples ==
=== Adolf Hitler ===
Adolf Hitler was one of the first targets of government analysis by the Office of Strategic Services on at least two occasions, one being by Dr. Henry Murray titled "Analysis of the Personality of Adolph Hitler", another by Walter Langer titled The Mind of Adolf Hitler, and another of unknown origin titled "Adolf Hitler". These psychobiographies included headers such as background, education, physique, religion, metamorphosis in Landsberg, sexual life, speechmaking technique, Hitler as he believes himself to be, Hitler as the German people know him, Hitler as his associates know him, Hitler as he knows himself, Hitler the man, and Predictions of Hitler's behavior in the coming future. These analyses included observations such as Hitler's messiah complex, sense of destiny, and how his rough beginnings inspired him to be where he is.

=== Woodrow Wilson ===
Woodrow Wilson was another target of analysis by psychobiographers George and George, who concluded a self-defeating pattern of low self-esteem and inner doubt that originated from his father, a Presbyterian Preacher whose perfectionist demands his son internalized. A competing analysis by Freud maintained that Wilson had not resolved the Oedipus complex and identified with his father and his harsh superego. His repressed aggression was reflected on those around him, who were his "younger brothers".

=== Jimmy Carter ===
From an academic perspective, Jimmy Carter's VICS score changed intensely from before to after the Soviet invasion of Afghanistan. Carter had previously been cooperative and friendly but changed to hostile and conflict prone afterward.

=== Bill Clinton ===
Bill Clinton's Trait and Motivation Profile, gathered from Q&A at press conferences, presented Bill Clinton as a single successful politician, rather than a part of a larger whole or cause (use of "I" was highest of post-World War II presidents while "we" was lowest), the use of qualifiers and retractors, presented a confident individual with no desire to control the flow of conversation but who would make decisions and rethink them when necessary. He doesn't use many explainers and tells, rather than explains his views. He is the most expressive post-World War II president and with high adverbial intensifiers, he is an actor who displays histrionic (attention seeking) behavior. His high negatives score shows he's very defensive when attacked.

=== Saddam Hussein ===
He was convinced in conspiracies of the US, Israel, and Iran to kill him. After the Kuwait invasion and defeat, he worked to shore up his forces and eventually began to trust party loyalists over his family, including two of his sons-in-law whom he killed after giving them amnesty. His goal was survival and a place in the world state with world class weapons. When backed into a corner, he fought with everything he had but could change his mind and compromise to be seen as a global leader.

=== Camp David Profiles ===
Post's creation of the Center for the Analysis of Personality and Behavior (CAPB) (later the Political Psychology Division) at CIA lead to the creation of the Camp David Profiles, psychobiographies of Anwar Sadat and Menachem Begin as well as how to manipulate each to get the best negotiation position. These were extensively studied by Carter, and resulted in the Nobel Prize. Among the findings were Anwar Sadat's "Nobel Prize Complex", his desire to be forever known in history as a great leader and Begin's biblical preoccupation and fixation on detail, which Carter was able to play off each other.

== See also ==
- Political decoy
