= Robert J. Kohler =

American intelligence official and aerospace executive

Robert J. Kohler Jr.
- Education: Rochester Institute of Technology (BS)
- Occupations: Intelligence official Aerospace executive

Robert J. Kohler Jr. is an American imaging specialist, former intelligence official, and aerospace executive. He served in the Central Intelligence Agency from 1967 to 1985, including as director of its Office of Development and Engineering. In that position, he was executive director of Program B, the CIA component of the National Reconnaissance Office (NRO). He later held executive positions at Lockheed Missiles and Space Company, ESL Incorporated, and TRW Inc. The NRO designated him a Pioneer of National Reconnaissance in 2000 for contributions to the evaluation and enhancement of overhead imagery. He received the CIA Distinguished Intelligence Medal and the National Intelligence Distinguished Service Medal in 1985.

== Education ==
Kohler earned a Bachelor of Science in photographic science and technology from the Rochester Institute of Technology (RIT) in 1959.

== CIA and National Reconnaissance Office career ==
Kohler joined the CIA in 1967. During his 18-year career, he held several positions in the agency's Directorate of Science and Technology and became director of the Office of Development and Engineering (OD&E). He left government service in 1985.

As OD&E director from March 1982 to August 1985, Kohler also served as executive director of NRO Program B. During a 1985 competition over the successor to the Magnum signals-intelligence satellites, Program B favored incremental improvements to existing systems rather than the larger satellite proposed by the Air Force's Program A. Director of Central Intelligence William J. Casey accepted the Program B recommendation over the position advanced by the NRO director.

Kohler began his intelligence career as a photographic specialist. His work introduced photographic edge-measurement and edge-sharpening tools used to evaluate and improve overhead imagery. The NRO included him among the inaugural class of 46 Pioneers of National Reconnaissance announced in 2000.

== Aerospace industry career ==
After leaving the CIA, Kohler became a vice president at Lockheed Missiles and Space Company. He was appointed president of ESL Incorporated, a TRW subsidiary specializing in communications and reconnaissance systems, in June 1986.

By 1994, he was an executive vice president of TRW and general manager of its Avionics and Surveillance Group, which managed avionics, communications, reconnaissance, and intelligence programs. He retired from TRW in 1995.

During the reductions in intelligence and defense spending that followed the Cold War, Kohler warned that inconsistent acquisition decisions and reductions in satellite programs were damaging the specialized industrial base that supported national reconnaissance. He also criticized direct lobbying by intelligence contractors before congressional committees, arguing that contractor proposals did not always reflect national requirements.

== Rochester Institute of Technology ==
Kohler joined RIT's Imaging Science Advisory Board during the mid-1980s and later became a university trustee. He worked with imaging scientist John Schott and RIT president M. Richard Rose to build support for an imaging-science doctoral program. The New York State Board of Regents approved the program, RIT's first PhD program, in December 1989.

RIT presented Kohler with its Distinguished Alumni Award in 1986. He later became a trustee emeritus.

== Writing and public commentary ==
Kohler's public writing has focused on national-reconnaissance organization, the intelligence industrial base, and government management of complex technical programs. His 2002 essay, “One Officer's Perspective: The Decline of the National Reconnaissance Office,” criticized the abolition of the NRO's Programs A, B, and C and the consolidation of their functions within a centralized organization. NRO deputy director Dennis Fitzgerald published a response disputing several of Kohler's conclusions. The NRO revisited the debate in 2005 by publishing the original essays, an update by Kohler, and additional commentary by Fitzgerald.

In 2006, Kohler and former OD&E director Edmund H. Nowinski published an article examining changes in intelligence-community program management. The authors emphasized the importance of experienced government program managers, realistic budgets, clearly assigned authority, and sustained technical expertise.

== Honors ==
Kohler received the CIA Distinguished Intelligence Medal and the National Intelligence Distinguished Service Medal in 1985. His other honors include the Intelligence Medal of Merit and awards for work on NRO programs.

== Selected publications ==
- Kohler, Robert (Autumn–Winter 1994). "The Intelligence Industrial Base". American Intelligence Journal. 15 (2): 85–91. JSTOR 44326927.
- Kohler, Robert J. (June 2002). "One Officer's Perspective: The Decline of the National Reconnaissance Office". Studies in Intelligence. 46 (2).
- Kohler, Robert (2005). "Recapturing What Made the NRO Great: Updated Observations on 'The Decline of the NRO'" (PDF). National Reconnaissance: Journal of the Discipline and Practice (2005-U1): 51–58.
- Nowinski, Edmund H.; Kohler, Robert J. (June 2006). "The Lost Art of Program Management in the Intelligence Community". Studies in Intelligence. 50 (2).
- Kohler, Robert (March 2025). "Letter to the Editors". Studies in Intelligence. 69 (1).
