= Peter Loewenberg =

American historian and psychoanalyst

Peter J. Loewenberg (born August 1933 in Hamburg, Germany) is an American historian and psychoanalyst, professor of "European cultural, intellectual, German, Austrian and Swiss history, political Psychology, integrating the identities of an historian and political psychologist with the clinical practice of psychoanalysis" at UCLA.

== Biography ==
Loewenberg was born in Hamburg in 1933 when Hitler acceded to power in Germany. His father's concern for the safety of his family during Hitler's reign led him to research various countries to move to, eventually settling in Shanghai, China. It is there that Loewenberg spent the first four years of his life. In 1937 his family immigrated to the United States and Peter was raised in Bakersfield, California. His father was a university psychiatrist and a humanist who wrote on Kant, Lichtenberg, and Nietzsche. His mother, who had been a socialist activist in the Weimar Republic, was a public health nurse.

Loewenberg traced his parents' activism and sacrifice to his pursuance of a diverse and profound education in 20th-century European cultural history, Austro-German history, and political psychology, as he saw it. "My intense conviction of the value of dual training has a personal, subjective source as well as the power of its subsequent value for my own work as a historian." He was educated at the left-wing University of California, Berkeley and the Free University of Berlin.

Peter Loewenberg was instrumental in lobbying the California legislature to pass the Research Psychoanalyst Law of 1977 Prior to that time, some non-clinician academics were occasionally allowed to study psychoanalysis at US psychoanalytic institutes, as Loewenberg himself had done at the Southern California Psychoanalytic Institute (SCIPI, now merged into the New Center for Psychoanalysis in Los Angeles). However, Loewenberg was required to obtain a degree and license in Marriage and Family Therapy (MFT) in order to practice as a psychoanalyst. With the aid of Martin Levine, a law professor at University of Southern California, among others, the California legislature passed and then-governor Jerry Brown signed the Research Psychoanalyst Law, making provision for limited psychoanalytic practice by non-clinician academics who had completed psychoanalytic training in California.

With Nancy Chodorow at the University of California at Berkeley and Bob Nemiroff at the University of California at San Diego, Loewenberg was a co-founder of the University of California Interdisciplinary Psychoanalytic Consortium, and the co-ordinator for their first meeting which consisted of 30 faculty and graduate students from the 10 different campuses of the University of California, in 1993. His view is that psychoanalysis allows the historian "to more effectively move back and forth across the internal boundaries between conscious, pre-conscious, and unconscious processes."

Loewenberg is currently an Emeritus Professor at the University of California, Los Angeles. He was Dean and Chairman of the Education Committee and Director of the Training School of the Southern California Psychoanalytic Institute and the New Center for Psychoanalysis, Los Angeles, 2001–2006.

He served as Sir Peter Ustinov Visiting professor at the University of Vienna in 2006. Also, he is Chair of the International Psychoanalytic Association China Committee and Editor of the IPAC Centenary History (1910–2010).

He has lectured in America, several countries in Europe, Africa, Israel, Hong Kong, China, and Latin America. He won the 1999 Edith Sabshin award for "excellence in teaching psychoanalytic concepts".

== Family ==
Loewenberg has three children, two sons and one daughter.

== Awards ==
- “1999 Edith Sabshin Award”
- “Social Science Research Council”
- “American Council of Learned Societies”
- “National Endowment for the Humanities”
- “Guggenheim Fellowship”
- “Austrian Ministry of Education”
- “Pro Helvetia”
- “Max Planck Institut fur Geschichte”

== Works ==
Loewenberg books published include,

- "Decoding the Past: The Psychohistorical Approach (New York: Alfred A. Knopf, 1983); (Berkeley and Los Angeles: University of California Press, 1985); (New Brunswick, N.J.: Transaction Publishers, 1996, paperback edition with a new introduction,)."
- "Fantasy and Reality in History (New York: Oxford University Press, 1995)"

== Publications ==
- "Austria 1918: Coming to Terms with the National Trauma of Defeat and Fragmentation", Österreich 1918 und die Folgen: Geschichte, Literatur, Theater und Film, Karl Mueller und Hans Wagener, eds., (Wien, Koeln, Weimar: Boehlau Verlag, 2009
- “Cultural History and Psychoanalysis”, Psychoanalysis and History, Vol. 9, No. 1 (2007), pp. 17–37
- ”The Bauhaus as a Creative Play Space: Weimar, Dessau, Berlin, 1919 -- 1933", The Annual of Psychoanalysis, Vol. XXXIII (2005), pp. 209–226
- “A Correspondence on Teaching Emotion and Politics” (with Mark Fisher), Clio's Psyche, 12:3 (December 2005), 113–118
- "Lucian and Sigmund Freud,” American Imago, Vol. 61, No. 1 (Spring, 2004), 89–99.
- "The IPA in China", International Psychoanalysis: News Magazine of the International Psychoanalytic Association, Vol. 17 (December 2008), pp 18–19
- "Freud as a Cultural Subversive", The Annual of Psychoanalysis, ed. Jerome Winer and James W. Anderson (Hillsdale, NJ: Analytic Press, 2001), 39:117–130.
- "Violence and Health: Personal, Social, National, Ethnic and Racial Issues", in Violence and Health (Kobe: World Health Organization, 2000), pp. 360–367
- "The Construction of National Identity", in Nancy Ginsburg and Roy Ginsburg, eds., Psychoanalysis and Culture at the Millennium (New Haven: Yale University Press, 1999), pp. 37–63
- "In California’s Universities Research Psychoanalysts Prove Their Interdisciplinary Mettle", The American Psychoanalyst, 30:1 (1996), 19–20.
- "Freud, Schnitzler, and Eyes Wide Shut", in Geoffrey Cocks, James Diedrick, and Glen Perusek, eds., Depth of Field: Film and the Uses of History (Madison: University of Wisconsin Press, 2006), pp. 255–279
- "Remembering Fawn McKay Brodie(1915-1981)", Clio's Psyche:, Vol. 13, No. 1 (June 2006), pp. 1–34
- "Freud as a Cultural Historian", The American Psychoanalyst, Vol. 40, No. 1 (Winter/Spring 2006), pp. 25–35
- "Klinische und historische Perspektiven intergenerationaler Vermittlung von Trauma", Psychosozial, 28 Jahrgang, Nr. 102 (2005), Heft 4, 9–17.”
- "A Correspondence on Teaching Emotion and Politics" (with Mark Fisher), Clio's Psyche, 12:3 (December 2005), 113–118. “Assisted Dying in Contemporary America”, in Andreas Bähr and Hans Medick, eds., Sterben von eigener Hand: Selbsttötung als kulturelle Praxis (Köln: Böhlau Verlag, 2005), pp. 219–38
- "Wild Analysis: A New Freud Translation", Journal of the American Psychoanalytic Association:, Vol. 53, No. 3 (2005), 973–979
- "Sigmund Freud, Max Weber, and the Shoah", Tel Aviver Jahrbuch für deutsche Geschichte, XXXII (Göttingen: Wallstein Verlag, 2004), pp. 135–147
- "Freud, Schnitzler und Eyes Wide Shut", Psyche, 58:12 (Dezember 2004), pp. 1156–1181
- "Die soziale Konstruktion der Sexualmoral und die klinische Situation", in Die Kindheit überleben, eds. Thomas Kniesche and Laurence Rickels (Würzburg: Verlag Königshausen & Neumann, 2004), pp. 3–12
- “Der Sozialpsychologisch-psychoanalytische Beitrag Bruno Bettelheims”, Zeitschrift für Politische Psychologie, Jg. 11, Nr. 1-3 (2003), pp. 241–244
- "The Psychology of Creating the Other in National Identity, Ethnic Enmity, and Racism", in Nancy M. Wingfield, ed., Creating the Other: Ethnic Conflict and Nationalism in Habsburg Central Europe (New York: Berghahn Books, 2003), pp. 243–256
- “Wo sind die Emotionen? Oder: Die Psychoanalyse als Proto-Postmoderne”, in Alf Gerlach, Anne-Marie Schlösser, Anna Springer, Hg, Psychoanalyse mit und ohne Couch: Haltung und Methode (Gießen: Psychosozial-Verlag, 2003), pp. 60–72
- "Postmodern Psychoanalytic Theory" (in Chinese), Historiography Quarterly (Chinese Academy of Social Sciences, Beijing), 4 (2002), 98–104
- "Aggression in World War I: The Deepest Part of Sigmund Freud’s Self-Analysis", Conflict and Cooperation: The Individual Between Ideal and Reality, ed. Günther Baechler and Andreas Wenger (Zürich: Neue Zürcher Zeitung Publishing, 2002), pp. 81–92
- "Psychoanalitycne Modele Historii: Freud Późneij", in Psyche I Klio: Historia W. Oczah Psychohistoryków, Tomasz Pawelec, ed. and trans. (Lublin: Wydawnictwo Uniwersytetu Marii Curie-Skłodowskeij, 2002), pp. 111–139
- Aggression im Ersten Weltkrieg: Der “tiefste Teil” von Sigmund Freuds Selbst-Ananlyse”, SOWI: Sozialwissenschaftliche Informationen (Freiburg), 3/2001, pp. 53–62
- "Legalizing and Advancing Psychoanalytic Academic Research Training", Clio's Psyche, 8: 1 (June 2001), pp. 1–31
- “John Muir and the Erotization of Nature”, Journal of Applied Psychoanalytic Studies, 2: 4 (2000), pp. 365–381
- "L'agressivité pendant la Première Guerre mondiale: l' auto-analyse approfondie de Sigmund Freud, Sigmund Freud de L'interprétation des rêves de L’Homme" (Paris: Presses Universitaires de France, 2000), pp. 55–63
- “Psychoanalysis as a Hermeneutic Science”, in Peter Brooks and Alex Woloch, eds., Whose Freud: The Place of Psychoanalysis in Contemporary Culture (New Haven: Yale University Press, 2000), pp. 96–115; 130–137
- “A Stoic Death: Sigmund Freud, Max Schur, and Assisted Dying in Contemporary America”, in Mark S. Micale and Robert L. Dietle, eds., Enlightenment, Passion, Modernity: Historical Essays in European Thought and Culture (Stanford: Stanford University Press, 2000), pp. 360–486
- “Emotion und Subjektivität: Desiderata der gegenwärtigen Geschichtswissenschaft aus psychoanalytischer Perspektive,” in P. Nolte, M. Hertling, F.M. Kuhlemann, and H.W. Schmuhl, eds., Perspetiven der Gesellschaftsgeschichte (München: Verlag C.H. Beck, 2000), pp. 58–78
- “The Construction of National Identity,” in Nancy Ginsburg and Roy Ginsburg, eds., Psychoanalysis and Culture at the Millennium (New Haven: Yale University Press, 1999), pp. 37–63
- “Xenophobie als intrapsychisches Phänomen” in Irene Etzersdorfer and Michel Ley (Hg.), Menschenangst: Die Angst vor dem Fremden (Berlin: Philo Verlag, 1999), pp. 113–120
- “Herzl Between Fantasy and Reality”, in Gideon Shimoni and Robert S. Wistrich, eds., Theodor Herzl (Jerusalem: Magnes Press of the Hebrew University, 1999), pp. 3–14.”
- “The Nation at Arms: Concepts of Nationalism and War in Germany, 1866-1914. Comment”, in Hartmut Lehmann and Hermann Wellenreuther, eds., German and American Nationalism in Comparative Perspective (Oxford: Berg Publishers, 1999), pp. 263–269
- "The Correspondence of Sigmund Freud and Sandor Ferenczi", vol. 2, 1914–1919, edited by Ernst Falzeder and Eva Brabant with the collaboration of Patrizia Giampieri-Deutsch under the supervision of André Haynal; transcribed by Ingeborg Meyer-Palmedo; translated by Peter T. Hoffer; introduction by Axel Hoffer (Cambridge, Massachusetts and London, England: The Belknap Press of Harvard University Press, 1996), in Psychoanalytic Books, 9:3 (1998), pp. 273–280
- "Psychoanalytische Ich-Psychologie, Objektbeziehungstheorie und ihre Anwendbarkeit in der Geschichtswissenschaft", in Jörn Rüsen and Jürgen Straub, ed., Die dunkle Spur der Vergangenheit: Psychoanalytische Zugänge zum Geschichtsbewusstsein; Erinnerung, Geschichte, Identität
- Forward to Geoffrey Cocks, Treating Mind and Body: Essays in the History of Science, Professions, and Society Under Extreme Conditions (New Brunswick: Transaction Publishers, 1998), pp. vii-xvii
- “Professional and Personal Insights”, Clio's Psyche, 4:2 (September 1997), 33–36
- “The Pagan Freud”, in Stephen Barker, ed., Excavations and Their Objects: Freud's Collection of Antiquity (Albany: State University of New York Press, 1996), pp. 13–32, 130–134
- "Psychoanalytic Ego Psychology and Object Relations and Their Uses for the Historian", Psychohistory Review: Studies of Motivation in History and Culture, 25:1 (Fall 1996), 21–46
- "Germany, the Home Front: The Physical and Psychological Consequences of Home Front Hardship", in Hugh Cecil, ed., Facing Armageddon: The First World War Experienced (London: Leo Cooper, 1996), pp. 554–562
- Decoding the Past: The Psychohistorical Approach (New York: Alfred A. Knopf, 1983); (Berkeley and Los Angeles: University of California Press, 1985); (New Brunswick, N.J.: Transaction Publishers, 1996, paperback edition with a new introduction,).”
- "Fantasy and Reality in History" (New York: Oxford University Press, 1995)
- "Spaltungen", in Ludger M. Hermanns, Hrsg., Spaltungen in der Geschichte der Psychoanalyse (Tübingen: Edition Discord, 1995), pp. 138–140
- "Psychoanalysis, Sexual Morality, and the Clinical Situation", in Rediscovering History: Culture, Politics, and the Psyche, Michael S. Roth, ed. (Stanford, CA: Stanford University Press, 1994), pp. 61–82
- "The State, National Hatred, and its Transcendence", Clio's Psyche, Vol. I, No. 3 (December, 1994), 4–7
- "Sigmund Freud's Psycho-Social Identity", 100 Years of Psychoanalysis: Contributions to the History of Psychoanalysis, André Haynal and Ernst Falzeder, eds., special issue of Cahiers Psychiatriques Genevois (London: Karnac Books, 1994), pp. 135–150
- "The Praxis of Peter Loewenberg", Clio's Psyche, 1:2 (September 1994), 5–8
- "The Psychological Reality of Nationalism: Between Community and Fantasy", Mind and Human Interaction, Vol. 5, No. 1 (February 1994), 6–18
- “Psychoanalytic Research Training: A California Success Story”, The American Psychoanalyst, 27:2 (1993), 11–12.”
- "Die Psychodynamik des Antijudismus in historischer Perspektive", Psyche: Zeitschrift für Psychoanalyse und ihre Anwendungen (Stuttgart), Vol. 46, No. 12 (December 1992), pp. 1095–1121
- Translated into Portuguese in IDE: Review of the Sociedade Brasileira de Psicanalise de São Paulo (1994)
- "The Psychodynamics of Nationalism", History of European Ideas, Vol. 15, No. 1-3 (August 1992), 93–103
- 'The Pagan Freud", in Robert Wistrich, ed., Austrians and Jews in the Twentieth Century (London: Macmillan Press, Ltd., 1992), pp. 124–141
- "Karl Renner and the Politics of Accommodation: Moderation versus Revenge", Austrian History Yearbook, Vol. 22 (1991), 35–56
- "The Uses of Anxiety", Partisan Review (1991), No. 3, pp. 514–525
- "Anxiety in History", Journal of Preventive Psychiatry and Allied Disciplines, 4: 2-3 (1990), pp. 143–164.”
- 'The Social Psychoanalytic Contributions of Bruno Bettelheim", Los Angeles Psychoanalytic Bulletin (Fall, 1990), pp. 30–32
- “A Conversation with Peter Loewenberg”, The American Psychoanalyst, 24:3 (Fall 1990), 8–11
- "Psychoanalytic Models of History: Freud and After", in William M. Runyan, ed., Psychology and Historical Interpretation (New York: Oxford University Press, 1988), pp. 126–156
- "The End of Analysis", Partisan Review, 55: 1 (1988), pp. 82–96
- "An Historical, Biographical, Literary, and Clinical Consideration of Freud's 'Analysis Terminable and Interminable' on its Fiftieth Birthday", International Journal of Psycho-Analysis, 69 (1988), pp. 273–281
- Translated and reprinted as: "Eine historische, biographische, literarische und klinische Betrachtung zum 50. Entstehungs jahr von Freuds Abhandlung "Die endliche und die unendliche Analyse", Psyche: Zeitschrift für Psychoanalyse und ihre Anwendungen (Stuttgart), 44: 9 (September 1990), 773–787
- "Psychodynamics of the Holocaust", in Remembering for the Future: The Impact of the Holocaust and Genocide on Jews and Christians (Oxford, England: Pergamon Press. Supplementary Volume, 1988), pp. 284–297
- "The Kristallnacht as a Public Degradation in Ritual", Leo Baeck Institute Yearbook, 32 (London: Secker & Warburg (1987), pp. 308–323
- Reprinted in Michael R. Marrus, The Nazi Holocaust, Vol. 2, "The Origins of the Holocaust" (Westport, CT Meckler), 1989, pp. 582–596. Translated into Chinese in History and Theory (Beijing, China), Vol. 2 (1988), pp. 128–136; translated into German as "Die 'Reichskristallnacht' vom 9. zum 10. November 1938 als "öffentliches Erniedrigungstitual", in Psychoanalysis 1986: Essays on a Theory and its Applications, Sigmund Freud House Bulletin (Vienna), Vol. 10 (Winter 1986), pp. 313–324; reprinted in Mitteilungsblatt der Berliner Ärztekammer, Vol. 25, No. 11 (3 November 1988), pp. 575–586. Werner Bohleber and John Kafka, Eds., Antisemitismus (Bielefeld: Aisthesis Verlag, 1992), pp. 39–64
- "Nixon, Hitler, and Power: An Ego Psychological Study", Psychoanalytic Inquiry, 6: 1 (1986), 27–48
- "Historical Method, the Subjectivity of the Researcher, and Psychohistory", Rapports, II, XVIe Congres International des Sciences Historiques (Stuttgart, 1985), pp. 634–640
- Reprinted in Psychohistory Review, 14:1 (1985), pp. 1–2
- ”Otto Bauer as an Ambivalent Party Leader", in Anson Rabinbach, ed., The Austrian Experiment: Social Democracy and Austromarxism, 1918-1934 (Boulder and London: Westview Press, 1985), pp. 71–79
- "A Creative Epoch in Modern Science: Psychiatry at the Burgholzli, 1902-1912", American College of Psychoanalysts Newsletter, Vol. XVI, No. 1 (Spring 1985), pp. 1–2
- "Subjectivity and Empathy as Guides to Progress in Counselling", Counsellor: Journal of the Institute of Educational & Vocational Guidance in Pakistan (Peshawar), Issue 2-84 (July–December 1984), 31–42
- Walther Rathenau and Henry Kissinger: The Jew as Modern Statesman in Two Political Cultures (New York: Leo Baeck Institute, 1980)
- "Psychohistory", in Michael Kammen, ed., The Past Before Us: Contemporary Historical Writing in the United States (Cornell University Press and the American Historical Association, 1980), pp. 408–432
- "Antisemitismus und jüdischer Selbsthass: Eine sich wechselseitig verstärkende sozialpsychologische Doppelbeziehung", Geschichte und Gesellschaft: Zeitschrift für Historische Sozialwissenschaft, 5: 4 (1979), pp. 455–475
- "Walther Rathenau and the Tensions of Wilhelmine Society", in David Bronsen, ed., Jews and Germans from 1860 to 1933: The Problematic Symbiosis (Heidelberg: Carl Winter Universitaetsverlag, 1979), 100–127.”
- "History and Psychoanalysis", in The International Encyclopedia of Neurology, Psychiatry, Psychoanalysis and Psychology (New York: Van Nostrand Reinhold Co., 1977), Vol. 5, pp. 363–374
- Translated into Spanish as "La Historia y el Psicoanalisis" in Enciclopedia Internacional de Psiquiatria, Psicologia, Psicoanalisis y Neurologia, Volumen V (Nueva York: Prensa de las Ciencias Humanas, 1977)
- "Psychohistorical Perspectives on Modern German History", Journal of Modern History, Vol. 47, No. 2, June 1975
- "Why Psychoanalysis Needs the Social Scientist and the Historian", International Review of Psycho-Analysis (London), 4: 3 (1977), pp. 305–315
- "Racism and Tolerance in Historical Perspective", in Race, Change, and Urban Society, Urban Affairs Annual Review, Vol. 5, P. Orleans and W. R. Ellis Jr., eds. (Beverly Hills, CA.: SAGE Publications Inc., 1971), pp. 561–576
- "Die Psychodynamic des Antijudentums", Jahrbuch des Instituts für Deutsche Geschichte, Walter Grab, ed., Vol.I (1972), pp. 145–158
- "Love and Hate in the Academy," The Center Magazine", V: 5 (September–October 1972), pp. 4–11
- ”The Psychodynamics of Campus Confrontations", Bulletin of the Woodview Hospital, VI: 1 (July 1972), pp. 1–12
- "Theodor Herzl: A Psychoanalytic Study in Charismatic Political Leadership", The Psychoanalytic Interpretation of History, Benjamin B. Wolman, ed. (Basic Books, 1971, pp. 150–191. Paperback edition Harper Torchbooks, 1973)
- "The Unsuccessful Adolescense of Heinrich Himmler", American Historical Review, 76-3 (June 1971), pp. 612–641
- "Sigmund Freud as a Jew: A Study of Ambivalence and Courage", Journal of the History of the Behavioral Sciences, VII: 4 (October 1971), pp. 363–369
- "The Psychohistorical Origins of the Nazi Youth Cohort", American Historical Review, 76: 5 (December 1971), pp. 1457–1502
- “Reprinted in John L. Snell and Allan Mitchell, eds., The Nazi Revolution: Hitler's Dictatorship and the German Nation, second edition (Lexington, Massachusetts: D. V. Heath and Co., 1973), pp. 93–116; in Sosiologi Grunnfag (Bergen, Troms, Oslo: Universitets-forlaget, 1973), pp. 72–117; in Anthony Esler, ed., The Youth Revolution: The Conflict of Generation in Modern History (D.C. Heath, 1947), pp. 82–105; in George Kren and Leon Rappoport, ed., Varieties of Psychohistory (New York: Springer Publishing Co., 1976); in Alfred J. Andrea and Wolfe W. Schmokel, eds., The Living Past: Western Historiographical Traditions (New York: John Wiley & Sons, 1975), pp. 270–284; Trans. in Chinese in History and Heart: Theories and Practice of Psychohistory in the West (Beijing: CIP, 1998), pp. 129–183; in Polish as “Psychohistoryczne Początki Nazistowskiej Młodej Kohorty”, in Psyche I Klio: Historia W Oczah Psychohistoryków, Tomasz Pawelec, ed. and trans. (Lublin: Wydawnictwo Uniwersytetu Marii Curie-Skłodowskeij, 2002), pp. 227–270
- "The Psychology of Racism", in The Great Fear: Race in the Mind of America, G. B. Nash and R. Weiss, eds., (New York: Holt, Rinehart and Winston, 1970), pp. 186–201
- Reprinted in Rereading America: Cultural Contexts for Critical Thinking and Writing, G. Colombo, R. Cullen, B. Lisle, eds. (New York: St. Martin's Press, 1989), pp. 114–122
- "Problems of the Academic Research Candidate", Newsletter of the National Candidates Council, American Psychoanalytic Association, 1: 2 (April 1971), pp. 11–13
- Arno Mayer's "Internal Causes and Purposes of War in Europe, 1870-1956 — an Inadequate Model of Human Behavior, National Conflict, and Historical Change", Journal of Modern History, Vol. 42, No. 4, December 1970
- "An Interview with Richard Drinnon", Studies on the Left, II: 1 Summer (1961), pp. 76–81
- "Oppositionelle Tendenzen in den USA", Blatter fur Deutsche und International Politik, VI: 9 (September 1961), pp. 838–846

== Book reviews and review essays ==
- “Sabine Hanrath, Zwischen ‘‘Euthanasie’’ und Psychiatriereform: Anstaltspsychiatrie in Wesfalen und Brandenburg: Ein deutsch-deutscher Vergleich (1945-1964) [Westfälisches Institut für Regionalgeschichte Landschaftsverband Westfalen-Lippe Münster. Forschungen zur Regionalgeschichte. Band 41. Herausgegeben von Bernd Walter.] (Paderborn, München, Wien, Zürich: Ferdinand Schöningh, 2002), in American Historical Review, 109:1 (February 2004), pp. 271-272.”
- Charles B. Strozier, Heinz Kohut: "The Making of a Psychoanalyst" (New York: Farrar, Straus, and Giroux, 2001), in The Journal of American History (June 2002), pp. 263–64
- Thomas J. Scheff, "Bloody Revenge: Emotions, Nationalism, and War" (Boulder, CO: Westview Press, 1994), in Journal of Social History (December 1995), pp. 213–214
- David M. Halperin, John J. Winkler and Froma I. Zeitlin, eds., "Before Sexuality: the construction of erotic experience in the ancient Greek world" (Princeton, N.J.: Princeton University Press, 1990), in Continuity and Change: A Journal of social Structure, Law and Demography in Past Societies, Vol. 7, No. 3, (December 1992), pp. 408–411
- YosefHayim Yerushalmi, "Freud’s Moses: Judaism Terminable and Interminable" (New Haven: Yale University Press, 1991), in International Review of Psycho-Analysis, Vol. 19 (1992), No. 4, pp. 509–512
- "The Private Life of a Nation Builder" review of Ernst Pawel, The Labyrinth of Exile: A Life of Theodor Herzl (New York: Farrar, Straus & Giroux, 1989), in The New York Times Book Review (December 31, 1989), p. 9
- Peter Gay, "Freud for Historians" (New York: Oxford University Press, 1985), in Journal of the American Psychoanalytic Association, 36: 3 (1988), pp. 808–810
- "Einstein in His Youth" review essay of The Collected Papers of Albert Einstein, Vol. I, The Early Years, 1879–1902, in Science, Vol. 239 (January 29, 1988), pp. 510–512
- "Mentor-protecting: The Freud-Fliess Correspondence", Times Literary Supplement (London), (February 7, 1986), pp. 145–146.”
- "Heinz Hohne, The Order of the Death's Head: The Story of Hitler's S.S.", trans., Richard Barry (New York: Coward-McCann, 1970), in The Journal of Interdisciplinary History, II: 4 (Spring 1972), pp. 483–488
- Martin Grotjahn, "The Voice of the Symbol" (Los Angeles: Mara Books, 1971), in Journal of the Otto Rank Association, 7: 2 (December 1972), pp. 84–86
- "The Case of Schreber, The Intrapsychic World and Modern Child Rearing: A Review Essay", History of Childhood Quarterly: The Journal of Psychohistory, 1: 1 (Fall 1973), pp. 337–341
- "Hitler's Psychodynamics Examined", Contemporary Psychology, 19: 2 (February 1974), pp. 89–91
- Wolfgang Kreutzberger, Studenten und Politik, 1918-1933: Der Fall Freiburg in Breisgau (Göttingen: Vandenhoeck & Ruprecht, 1972), in Journal of Modern History, 46: 1 (March 1974), pp. 155–156
- Robert Payne, "The Life and Death of Adolf Hitler" (New York: Praeger Publishers, 1973), in Review d'Histoire de la Deuxiem Guerre Mondiale (Paris, August–September–October 1974), Bulletin No. 212, pp. 32–34
- "Review essay of Walter C. Langer, The Mind of Adolf Hitler: The Secret Wartime Report" (New York: Basic Books, 1972) in Central European History, 7: 3 (September 1974), pp. 262–275
- "Une psychanalyse de Hitler", Revue d'Historie de la Deuzieme Guerre Mondiale, 97 (Janvier, 1975), pp. 91–96
- Leland V. Bell, "In Hitler's Shadow: The Anatomy of American Nazism' (Port Washington, New York: Kennikat Press, 1973) in The Historian, 37: 2 (February 1975), pp. 328-329
- Paul Roazen, "Freud and His Followers" (New York: Alfred A. Knopf, 1975), for Group for the Use of Psychology in History Newsletter, IV: 1 (June 1975), pp. 27–28
- Martin Jay, "The Dialectical Imagination: A History of the Frankfurt School and Institute of Social Research, 1923-1950" (Boston: Little, Brown and Company, 1973), in Isis, 66: 232 (June 1975), pp. 291–293
- Jacques Barzun, Clio and the Doctors: Psychohistory, Quanto-History and History (Chicago: University of Chicago Press, 1974) for CLIO: Interdisciplinary Journal of Literature, History, Philosophy of History, 5: 1 (Fall 1975), pp. 123–127
- Jay Y. Gonen, "A Psychohistory of Zionism" (New York: Mason Charter Publishers, 1975), in History of Childhood Quarterly, 3: 2 (Fall 1975), pp. 300–305
- Erik H. Erikson, "Life History and the Historical Moment" (New York: W. W. Norton and Company, 1975), in Pacific Historical Review, 44: 4 (November 1975), pp. 555–556
- Alexander and Margaret Mitscherlich, "The Inability to Mourn: Principles of Collective Behavior" (New York: Grove Press, 1975), in History of Childhood Quarterly (Spring 1976), pp. 617–620
- "Comment on Michael Selzer, "Psychohistorical Approaches to the Study of Nazism", Journal of Psychohistory (Fall 1976), pp. 228–230.”
- Saul Friedlander, "Historie et Psychanalyse: Essai sur les Possibilites et les Limites de la Psychohistoire" (Paris: Seuil, 1975), in American Historical Review, 81: 4 (October 1976), pp. 821–822
- “Peter D. Stachura, Nazi Youth in the Weimar Republic (Santa Barbara and Oxford: Clio Books, 1975), in Journal of Modern History, 49: 4 (December 1977), pp. 712-713, and Canadian Journal of History, 22: 3 (1976), pp. 401-402
- “Sidney M. Bolkosky, The Distorted Image: German Jewish Perceptions of Germans and Germany, 1918-1935 (New York: Elsevier Publishing Co., 1975), for History and Theory, 16: 3 (1977), pp. 361-367
- "A New Tyranny over Youth", a review essay of John R. Gillis, Youth and History: Tradition and Change in European Age Relations 1770–Present (New York and London: Academic Press, 1975), in Reviews in European History, 3: 1 (March 1977), pp. 39–43
- Bruce Mazlish, "The Revolutionary Ascetic: Revolution of a Political Type" (New York: Books 1976), in American Historical Review, 82: 2 (April 1977), pp. 336–337
- "From Bismarck to Hitler" review of Gordon A. Craig, Germany: 1866-1945 (Oxford University Press, 1978), "Book World" Washington Post (January 7, 1979)
- ”Insiders and Outsiders", Partisan Review, 44: 3 (1979), 461–470. Essay on Peter Gay, Freud, Jews and Other Germans: Masters and Victims in Modernist Culture, and A Confidential Matter: The Letters of Richard Strauss and Stefan Zweig, pp. 1931–1935
- "The Flowering of Vienna," review of Carl E. Schorske, Fin-de-Siecle Vienna: Politics and Culture (New York: Knopf, 1981), Partisan Review, 48: 3 (1981), pp. 463–469
- “Albert H. Schrut, M.D., Are You Listening Doctor?: A Fictional Account of Patients in Therapy. Chicago: Nelson-Hall, 1980, in Bulletin of the So. Cal. Psychoanalytic Institute, 62 (Fall 1981), p. 36
- “Fred Weinstein, The Dynamics of Nazism: Leadership, Ideology, and the Holocaust (New York: Academic Press, 1980), in Psychohistory Review, 11: 1 (Fall 1982), 118-121.”
- “Donald M. Lowe, History of Bourgeois Perception (Chicago: University of Chicago Press, 1983), in American Historical Review (December 1984), 1301-1302.”
- "Expanding History." Review of David E. Stannard, Shrinking History: On Freud and the Failure of Psychohistory (New York: Oxford University Press, 1980), in Partisan Review, 51: 1 (1984), 133–137.”
- “Peter Gay, The Bourgeois Experience: Victoria to Freud, Volume 1, Education of the Senses (New York: Oxford University Press, 1984), in Journal of Modern History, 57: 2 (June 1985), 338-341.”
- “Peter Gay, Freud for Historians, (New York: Oxford University Press, 1985), in Los Angeles Times (November 3, 1985).”
- “Norbert Bromberg and Verna Volz Small, Hitler's Psychopathology (New York: International Universities Press, 1983) in International Review of Psychoanalysis, 12: 4 (1985), 483-485.”
- “Mark E. Blum, The Austro-Marxists, 1890-1918: A Psychobiographical Study (Lexington: University Press of Kentucky, 1985), in American Historical Review, 91: 1 (February 1986), pp. 146-147.”
- “Yiannis Gabriel, Freud and Society (London: Routledge & Kegan Paul, 1983), in Journal of the American Psychoanalytic Association, 34: 3 (1986), 741- 743.”
- “Grete Klingenstein, Heinrich Lutz, and Gerald Stourzh, eds., Biographie und Geschichtswissenschaft: Aufsatze zur Theorie und Praxis biographischer Arbeit (Vienna: Verlag fur Geschichte und Politik, 1979), in Austrian History Yearbook, Vol. XIX-XX (1983-84), Part 1, pp. 263-269.”
- "Documents of Psychiatry from Antiquity to Freud: History or Antiquarianism?”, Contemporary Psychology, 15: 2 (February 1970), pp. 90–92.”
- “Kurt H. Wolff and Barrington Moore, Jr., eds., The Critical Spirit: Essay in Honor of Herbert Marcuse (Boston: Beacon Press, 1967), in Journal of Modern History, 41: 4 (December 1969), pp. 518-522.”
- “Ernst Nolte, ed., Theorien über den Faschismus ("Neue Wissenschaftlicke Bibliothek," Geschichte: Number 21), (Cologne: Verlag Kiepenbeuer & Witsch, 1967), Journal of Modern History, XLI: 3 (September 1969), pp. 368–370.”

== Recent ==
Loewenberg was asked for a self-evaluation. His response was, "In associating to what I think is worth mentioning as uniquely meritorious about my interdisciplinary work, I come up with three things:"

1. Created, lobbied, and fought to passage the California Research Psychoanalyst Law of 1977 (California Business & Professions Code, sec. 2529–252.5), which places academic analysts under the California Medical Board to permit university faculty to acquire full psychoanalytic training and legally practice as psychoanalysts.
2. A founder of the University of California Interdisciplinary Psychoanalytic Consortium, which since 1993 has pulled together in annual seminars and workshops all humanists, social scientists, and mental health clinicians dedicated to using psa in their research and teaching.
3. As Dean of the Southern California Psychoanalytic Institute (2001–2006) led the successful effort to re-unify the two institutes that split in 1950 to form the New Center for Psychoanalysis in Los Angeles.
