= Frank Snepp =

American journalist and whistleblower (born 1943)

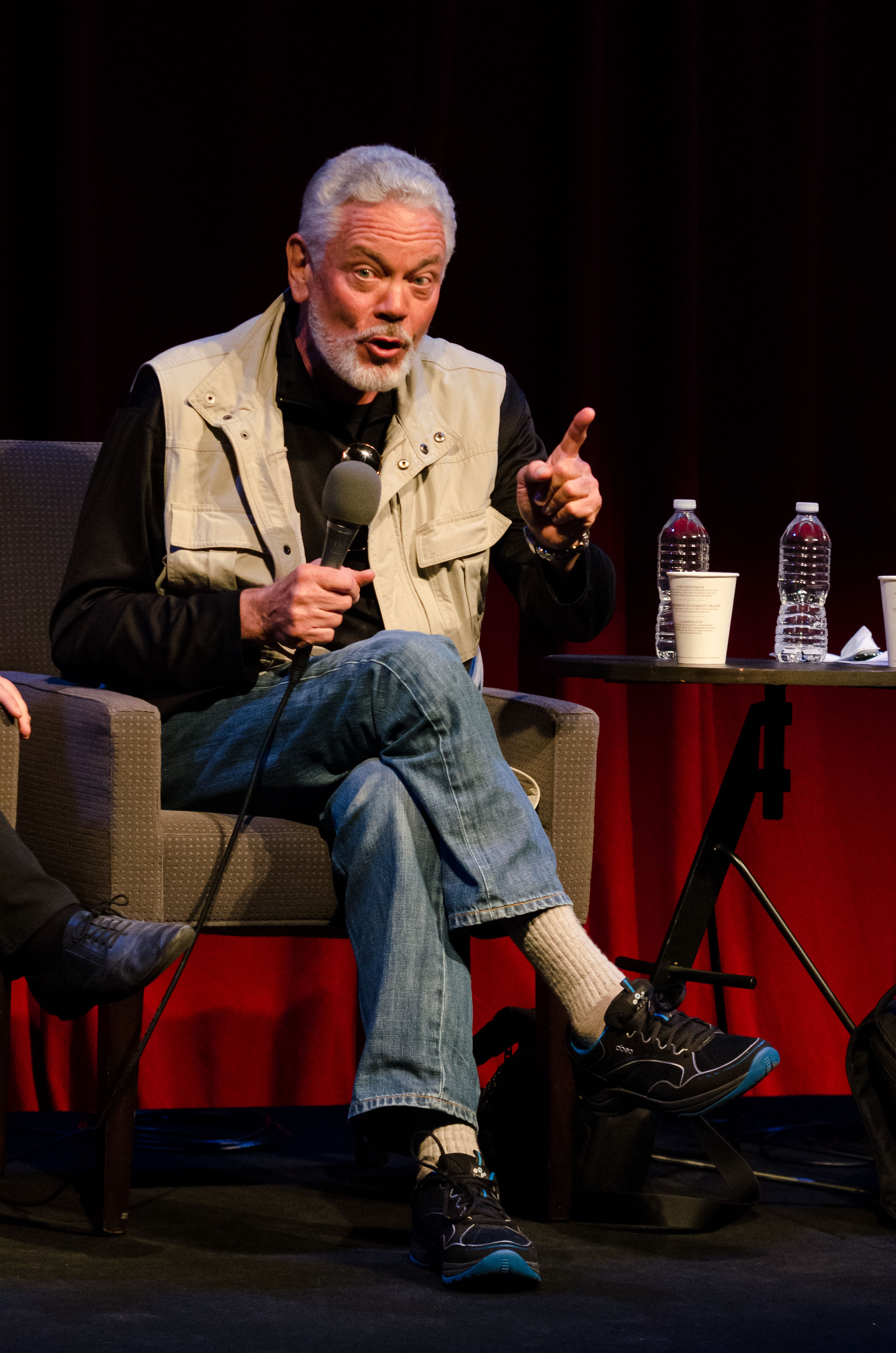
- Snepp speaks in 2013
- Born: Frank Warren Snepp III; May 3, 1943 (age 83); Kinston, North Carolina
- Education: Columbia University (BA, MIA)
- Occupations: investigative journalist, author
- Known for: former chief CIA analyst in the United States Embassy, Saigon, whistleblower
- Awards: Intelligence Medal of Merit (1975); Emmy Award (1997); Peabody Award (2006)

Frank Warren Snepp, III (born May 3, 1943) is an American journalist and former chief analyst of North Vietnamese strategy for the Central Intelligence Agency (CIA) in Saigon during the Vietnam War. For five out of his eight years as a CIA officer, he worked as interrogator, agent debriefer, and chief strategy analyst in the United States Embassy, Saigon; he was awarded the Intelligence Medal of Merit for his work. Snepp is a former producer for KNBC-TV in Los Angeles, California. He was one of the first whistle blowers who revealed the inner workings, secrets and failures of the national security services in the 1970s. As a result of a loss in a 1980 court case brought by the CIA, all of Snepp's publications require prior approval by the CIA.

== Background ==
Born in Kinston, North Carolina, Snepp studied Elizabethan literature at Columbia University, graduating in 1965. After spending a year at CBS News, he returned to Columbia's School of International and Public Affairs, from which he graduated in 1968.

== Career ==
=== CIA (1968–1976) ===
Snepp was recruited to the CIA in 1968, by the Associate Dean of the School of International and Public Affairs, Columbia University, Philip Mosely. Initially working on NATO and European security, he was sent to Saigon in 1969. Here Snepp worked as an analyst and counter-intelligence officer, coordinating agent networks and interrogation of captured enemy forces as well as preparing strategic estimates regarding the enemy. Snepp rejected the usual 2-year rotation, and stayed in Vietnam until the US was forced out in 1975. Snepp wrote in 2009 that he was "still haunted" by the "psychological manipulation and torment of a prisoner" he was involved with as a CIA interrogator.

Snepp was on hand for the Fall of Saigon and was one of the last Americans to leave the US Embassy, Saigon before the city fell to the North Vietnamese on April 30, 1975. Snepp was evacuated with other American personnel in Operation Frequent Wind. On his return to the US Snepp was awarded the Intelligence Medal of Merit in December 1975, but he resigned from the Agency in January 1976, upset at its refusal to rescue Vietnamese left behind in the pull-out, and its refusal to acknowledge mistakes made.

=== Memoir ===
Snepp wrote a memoir, Decent Interval, about the evacuation of US personnel from Saigon. It was published in 1977 without prior approval from the CIA Publications Review Board. Prior to publication, and while still employed at the CIA, Snepp attempted to tell the inspector general about the problems surrounding the evacuation, but was told that it "could not deal with anything so controversial".

After the book was published, CIA Director Stansfield Turner pushed for Snepp to be sued and, despite the objections of some Department of Justice officials, Turner prevailed. Since publication of the book could not be stopped under the constitutional law forbidding prior restraint of the press, the CIA sued Snepp for breach of contract. Snepp was accused of violating the non-disclosure agreement he had signed when he joined the agency that forbade publication of any material about CIA operations without the prior consent of the agency. Ironically, President Jimmy Carter permitted the lawsuit against Snepp at the same time he had proposed the creation of a special unit to provide protection for civil service whistle blowers. In a press conference, Carter said that Snepp did not qualify as a whistleblower as he did not "reveal anything that would lead to an improvement in our security apparatus or the protection of Americans' civil rights." Carter also claimed that Snepp had "revealed our nation's utmost secrets", a charge which was not part of the government's suit.

Snepp enlisted the help of the American Civil Liberties Union in his defense. The CIA won a court verdict against Snepp, with the US Supreme Court ruling that Snepp's book had caused "irreparable harm" to national security due to creating an appearance of a breakdown of discipline in the CIA. The royalties from Decent Interval (amounting to $300,000 by the time Snepp lost in front of the Supreme Court) were surrendered to the CIA, and Snepp forced to clear all future publications with the CIA. Snepp described the court decision as a "ticking time-bomb" which exploded when the cigarette manufacturer Brown & Williamson used the precedent to force CBS not to air an interview with whistleblower Jeffrey Wigand.

In 2001 Snepp published a second book, Irreparable Harm, about his court battle with the CIA.

=== Journalism (1980–present) ===
In 1980, following the Supreme Court decision against him, Snepp became an investigative journalist, contributing to publications including The New York Times, The Washington Post, the Village Voice and others.

During the late 1980s, he taught a Journalism and the Law course at California State University, Long Beach. He was a technical consultant for the comedy film Spies Like Us and was interviewed on his Vietnam War experiences for Ken Burns's series The Vietnam War and Vietnam: The Ten Thousand Day War.

Snepp worked in television for ABC's World News Tonight (1987–92), CBS (2003–05) and NBC from 2005. At World News Tonight he got Eugene Hasenfus to confirm that he had signed a government secrecy agreement, confirming the government's involvement in the Iran-Contra affair.

Snepp won an Emmy Award in 1997 for an investigation into Mexican drug trafficking. He won a Peabody Award in 2006 as producer on an investigation for KNBC-TV-Los Angeles of a Los Angeles housing development sited on a toxic landfill.

Snepp sued KNBC-TV for age discrimination after he was dismissed from his job in 2012. A jury deadlocked in 2015, and the case was settled in March 2016.

== Quotes ==
"Disinformation is most effective in a very narrow context."

Christian Science Monitor, February 26, 1985

"We always leave the last war thinking we have all the answers, but we end up having more questions."

University of California, Irvine, May 12, 2005

== Books ==
- Decent Interval: An Insider's Account of Saigon's Indecent End Told by the CIA's Chief Strategy Analyst in Vietnam by Frank Snepp (1977) ISBN 0-7006-1213-0
- Irreparable Harm: A Firsthand Account of How One Agent Took on the CIA in an Epic Battle Over Free Speech by Frank Snepp, with foreword by Anthony Lewis (1999) ISBN 0-7006-1091-X

== Awards ==
- Intelligence Medal of Merit (16 December 1975)
- Emmy Award (1997)
- Peabody Award (2006)

== See also ==
- Philip Agee
- Ralph McGehee
- Lindsay Moran
- John Stockwell
