= Elizabeth Sudmeier =

American spy

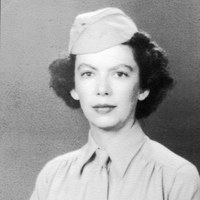
- in 1944
- Born: May 12, 1912; Timber Lake, South Dakota, U.S.
- Died: April 7, 1989 (aged 76); Washington, D.C., U.S.
- Education: The College of St. Catherine
- Employer(s): Central Intelligence Agency; Central Intelligence Group

Elizabeth Sudmeier (May 12, 1912 – April 7, 1989) was an American spy and founding member of the Central Intelligence Agency. Sudmeier was involved with The Petticoat Panel, a report about the status of women in the CIA.

== Early life and education ==
Sudmeier was born in Timber Lake, South Dakota, close to the Great Sioux Nation. Her father was fluent in the Sioux language. She studied English literature at The College of St. Catherine and graduated with a bachelor's degree in 1933. Sudmeier returned to South Dakota in 1933, where she worked as an English teacher for five years. She joined a bank in 1935, where she worked as a secretary.

== Career ==
In World War II Sudmeier joined the Women's Army Auxiliary Corps as a corporal. She had assignments in Edmonton and Fairbanks. She was awarded the World War II Asiatic Pacific Campaign Medal. Sudmeier joined the Central Intelligence Group, where she worked as a stenographer in the Office of Reports and Excellence. She became a charter member of the Central Intelligence Agency in 1947, and then transferred there from the Central Intelligence Group in 1951.

Sudmeier was one of few women in the Junior Officer Trainee program in the 1950s. She worked as a reports operator, managing the Stations' Foreign Intelligence production. She was responsible for collecting information about priority targets and relaying information to the Central Intelligence Agency. During her first field assignment Sudmeier was involved in a counterintelligence operation. She was involved in a nine-year campaign in the Middle East where she coordinated an agent to assess Soviet military hardware. One day in early 1954, Elizabeth Sudmeier loitered outside a cafe in Baghdad, taking care not to draw attention to herself. In a few minutes, the man she had been anticipating, the one she had spent months persuading to meet her, arrived, handed her an envelope and moved on. Sudmeier had just stolen Soviet secrets … the blueprints for the MiG-19 jet fighter, just gifted by Moscow to the Iraqis to gain favor in the region.

A report about the role of women in the CIA, which became known as the Petticoat Panel, was commissioned by Allen Dulles after a group of women employees questioned the gender pay gap. At the time, men were paid considerably more than women, and comments such as "Women are not qualified to perform in those positions which they do not now occupy,” were commonplace.

Sudmeier was nominated for the Intelligence Medal of Merit, which caused controversy amongst members of the intelligence community who thought it was not appropriate for woman to be awarded such a distinction. She was supported by her colleagues in the Central Intelligence Agency North East region, and was eventually awarded the medal in 1962. Her supervisors continued to support her, included arguing that her 'gender [should not] prevent her' in her promotion. In 1966 Sudmeier was promoted to the GS-13 career grade. She was involved with raising the profile of the Reports Officers, making people recognise that it was more than "women's work".

In 1972 Sudmeier took mandatory retirement. She died in Washington, D.C., in 1989. In 2013 Sudmeier was nominated as one of the Central Intelligence Agency Trailblazers. The award was received by her nieces, nephews and two grand-nieces.

== Awards & Accomplishments ==
- Received Intelligence Medal of Merit in 1962.
- Selected as one of the 2013 CIA Trailblazers.
