= Political psychology =

Interdisciplinary study of the relationship between political and psychological processes

Political psychology (or psychology of politics) is an interdisciplinary academic field, dedicated to understanding politics, politicians and political behavior from a psychological perspective, and psychological processes using socio-political perspectives. The relationship between politics and psychology is considered bidirectional, with psychology being used as a lens for understanding politics and politics being used as a lens for understanding psychology. As an interdisciplinary field, political psychology borrows from a wide range of disciplines, including: anthropology, economics, history, international relations, journalism, media studies, philosophy, political science, psychology, and sociology.

Political psychology aims to understand interdependent relationships between individuals and contexts that are influenced by beliefs, motivation, perception, cognition, information processing, learning strategies, socialization and attitude formation. Political psychological theory and approaches have been applied in many contexts such as: leadership role; domestic and foreign policy making; behavior in ethnic violence, war and genocide; group dynamics and conflict; racist behavior; voting attitudes and motivation; voting and the role of the media; nationalism; and political extremism. In essence political psychologists study the foundations, dynamics, and outcomes of political behavior using cognitive and social explanations.

== History and early influences ==
=== France ===
Political psychology originated from Western Europe, France, where it was closely tied to the emergence of new disciplines and paradigms as well as to the precise social and political context in various countries. The discipline political psychology was formally introduced during the Franco-Prussian war and the socialist revolution, stirred by the rise of the Paris Commune (1871). The term political psychology was first introduced by the ethnologist Adolf Bastian in his book Man in History (1860). The philosopher Hippolyte Taine (1828–1893), a founder of the Ecole Libre de Sciences Politiques, applied Bastian's theories in his works The Origins of Contemporary France (1875–1893), to ideas on the founding and development of the Third Republic. The head of Ecole Libre de Sciences Politiques, Émile Boutmy (1835–1906), was a famous explorer of social, political and geographical concepts of national interactions. He contributed various works on political psychology such as English People; A study of their Political Psychology (1901) and The American People; Elements of Their Political Psychology (1902). The contributor of crowd theory Gustave Le Bon (1841–1931) suggested that crowd activity subdued will and polluted rational thought which resulted in uncontrollable impulses and emotions. He suggested in his works Psychology of Socialism (1896) and Political Psychology and Social Defense (1910) that in the uncontrollable state of a crowd people were more vulnerable to submission and leadership, and suggested that embracing nationalism would remedy this.

=== Italy ===
Meanwhile, in Italy, the Risorgimento (1870) instigated various social reforms and voting rights. The large division in social class during this period led lawyer Gaetano Mosca (1858–1914) to publish his work, The Ruling Class: Elements of Political Science (1896), which theorized the presence of the ruling and the ruled classes of all societies. Vilfredo Pareto (1828–1923), inspired by Mosca's concepts, contributed The Rise and Fall of the Elites (1901) and The Socialist System (1902–1903) to the discipline of political psychology, theorizing on the role of class and social systems. His work The Mind and Society (1916) offers a sociology treatise. Mosca and Pareto's texts on the Italian elite contributed to the theories of Robert Michels (1875–1936). Michels was a German socialist fascinated by the distinction between the largely lower class run parliament in Germany and upper class run parliament in Italy. He wrote Political Parties: A Sociological Study of the Oligarchic Tendencies of Modern Democracy (1911).

=== Austria ===
Sigmund Freud (1856–1939) contributed a large psychoanalytical influence to the discipline of political psychology. His texts Totem and Taboo (1913) and Group Psychology and the Analysis of the Ego (1921) linked psychoanalysis with politics. Freud and Bullitt (1967) developed the first psycho-biographical explanation to how the personality characteristics of U.S. President Woodrow Wilson affected his decision making during World War I. Wilhelm Reich (1897–1957), inspired by the effects of World War II, was interested in whether personality types varied according to epoch, culture and class. He described the bidirectional effect of group, society and the environment with personality. He combined Freudian and Marxist theories in his book The Mass Psychology of Fascism (1933). He also edited The Journal for Political Psychology and Sexual Economy (1934–1938) which was the first journal to present political psychology in the principal of western language.

=== Germany ===
In Germany, novice political alterations and fascist control during World War II spurred research into authoritarianism from Frankfurt School. Philosopher Herbert Marcuse (1898–1979) opened up issues concerning freedom and authority in his book, Reason and Revolution: Hegel and the Rise of Social Theory (1941), where he suggested groups compromise on individual rights. Theodor W. Adorno (1903–1969) also investigated authoritarian individuals and anti-Semitism. His report The Authoritarian Personality (1950) attempts to determine the personality type susceptible to following fascism and anti-democratic propaganda. Nazi movements during World War II also spurred controversial psychologists such as Walther Poppelreuter (1932) to lecture and write about political psychology that identified with Hitler. The psychologist Erich Jaensch (1883–1940) contributed the racist book The Anti-type (1933).

=== United Kingdom ===
At the turn of the century, Oxford University and Cambridge University introduced disciplinary political psychology courses such as "The Sciences of the Man", along with the foundation of the Psychological society (1901) and the Sociological society (1904). Oxford historian George Beardoe Grundy (1861–1948) noted political psychology (1917) as a sub-discipline of history. Motivated by social and political behavior during World War I, he deemed a new branch of historical science, "The Psychology of Men Acting in Masses". He referred to science to instrument the clarification of mistaken beliefs about intention. The intellectual Graham Wallas (1859–1932) implicated the significance of studying psychology in politics in Human Nature in Politics (1908). Wallace emphasized the importance of enlightening politicians and the public about the psychological processes in order to raise awareness on exploitation while developing control over one's own psychological intellect. He suggested in Great Society (1917) that recognition of such processes could help to build a more functional humanity.

=== United States ===
Across the Atlantic the first American to be considered a political psychologist was Harold Lasswell (1902–1978) whose research was also spurred by a sociological fascination of World War I. His work Propaganda Technique in the World War (1927) discussed the use of applying psychological theories in order to enhance propaganda technique. Lasswell moved to Europe shortly after where he started to tie Freudian and Adler personality theories to politics and published Psychopathology and Politics (1930). His major theories involved the motives of the politically active and the relation between propaganda and personality.

Another contributing factor to the development of Political Psychology was the introduction of psychometrics and "The Measurement of Attitude" by Thurstone and Chave (1929). The methodological revolution in social science gave quantitative grounds and therefore more credibility to Political Psychology. Research into political preference during campaigns was spurred by George Gallup (1901–1984), who founded the "American Institute of Public Opinion". The 1940s election in America drew a lot of attention in connection with the start of World War II. Gallup, Roper and Crossley instigated research into the chances of Roosevelt being re-elected. Lazarsfeld, Berelson and Gaudet (1944) also conducted a famous panel study "The People's Choice" on the 1940s election campaign. These studies drew attention to the possibility of measuring political techniques using psychological theories. The entry of the US into World War II spiraled vast research into fields such as war technique, propaganda, group moral, psycho-biography and culture conflict to name a few, with the U.S. army and Navy recruiting young psychologists. Thus the discipline quickly developed and gained international accreditation.

Hadley Cantril and L. A. Free established the Institute for International Social Research to focus "attention primarily on psychological changes which influence political behavior in ways that have significant effect on international relations." They studied "governments and why, in terms of psychological variables, they behave as they do in regard to international issues."

McGuire identifies three broad phases in the development of political psychology, these three phases are: (1) The era of personality studies in the 1940s and 1950s dominated by psychoanalysis. (2) The era of political attitudes and voting behavior studies in the 1960s and 1970s characterized by the popularity of "rational man" assumptions. (3) An era since the 1980s and 1990s, which has focused on political beliefs, information processing and decision making, and has dealt in particular with international politics.

== Personality and politics ==
The study of personality in political psychology focuses on the effects of leadership personality on decision-making, and the consequences of mass personality on leadership boundaries. Key personality approaches utilized in political psychology are psychoanalytic theories, trait-based theories and motive-based theories.

=== A psychoanalytical approach ===
Sigmund Freud (1856–1939) made significant contributions to the study of personality in political psychology through his theories on the unconscious motives of behavior. Freud suggested that a leader's behavior and decision-making skill were largely determined by the interaction in their personality of the id, ego and superego, and their control of the pleasure principle and reality principle. The psychoanalytic approach has also been used extensively in psychobiography's of political leaders. Psychobiography's draw inferences from personal, social and political development, starting from childhood, to understand behavior patterns that can be implemented to predict decision-making motives and strategies.

=== A trait-based approach ===
Traits are personality characteristics that show to be stable over time and in different situations, creating predispositions to perceive and respond in particular ways. Gordon Allport (1897–1967) realized the study of traits introducing central, secondary, cardinal and common traits. These four distinctions suggest that people demonstrate traits to varying degrees, and further that there is a difference between individual and common traits to be recognized within a society. Hans Eysenck (1916–1997) contributed three major traits. Currently, however, Costa and McCrae's (1992) "Big Five" personality dimensions are the most recognized; these are: neuroticism, extraversion, agreeableness, openness to experience and conscientiousness. Theories in political psychology induce that one's combination of these traits has implications for leadership style and capacity. For example, individuals who score highly on extroversion are demonstrated as having superior leadership skills. The Myers-Briggs Type Indicator (MBTI) is a personality assessment scale commonly used in the study of political personality and for job profiling.

=== A motive-based approach ===
In terms of political psychology, motivation is viewed as goal-oriented behavior driven by a need for four things; power, affiliation, intimacy, and achievement. These categories were grouped by Winter (1996) from Murray's (1938) twenty suggested common human goals. Need for power affects the style in which a leader performs. Winter and Stewart (1977) suggested that leaders high in power motivation and low in need of affiliation intimacy motivation make better presidents. Affiliation-motivated leaders alternatively tend to collaborate joint efforts in the absence of threat. Lastly, achievement motivation has demonstrated to not correspond with political success, especially if it is higher than power motivation (Winter, 2002). Motivation between a leader and those whom they are ruling needs to be consistent with success. Motives have been shown to be correlated more highly with situation and time since last goal-fulfillment, rather than consistent traits. The Thematic Apperception Test (TAT) is commonly used for assessing motives. However, in the case of leadership assessment this test is more difficult to implement therefore more applicable tests are often used such as content analysis of speeches and interviews.

== Frameworks for assessing personality ==
=== The authoritarian personality ===
The authoritarian personality is a syndrome theory that was developed by the researchers Adorno, Frenkel-Brunswick, Levinson and Sanford (1950) at The University of California. The American Jewish Committee subsidized research and publishing on the theory since it revolved around ideas developed from World War II events. Adorno (1950) explained the authoritarian personality type from a psychoanalytic point of view suggesting it to be a result of highly controlled and conventional parenting. Adorno (1950) explained that individuals with an authoritarian personality type had been stunted in terms of developing an ability to control the sexual and aggressive id impulses. This resulted in a fear of them and thus development of defense mechanisms to avoid confronting them. Authoritarian personality types are persons described as swinging between depending on yet resenting authority. The syndrome was theorized to encompass nine characteristics; conventionalism, authoritarian submission, authoritarian aggression, anti-intraception (an opposition to subjective or imaginative tendencies), superstition and stereotypy, power and toughness, destructiveness and cynicism, sex obsession, and projectivity. The authoritarian personality type is suggested to be: ethnocentric, ego-defensive, mentally rigid, conforming and conventional, adverse to the out of the ordinary, and as having conservative political views. The book The Authoritarian Personality (1950) introduces several scales based on different authoritarian personality types. These are: the F-scale which measures from where and to what degree fascist attitudes develop, the anti-Semitism scale, the ethnocentrism scale and the politico economic conservatism scale. The F-scale, however, is the only scale that is expected to measure implicit authoritarian personality tendencies.

Bob Altemeyer (1996) deconstructed the authoritarian personality using trait analysis. He developed a Right-wing Authoritarianism (RWA) scale based on the traits: authoritarian submission, authoritarian aggression, and conventionalism. Altmeyer (1996) suggested that those who score high on the F-scale have low ability for critical thinking and therefore are less able to contradict authority. Altmeyer's theories also incorporate the psychodynamic point of view, suggesting that authoritarian personality types were taught by their parents to believe that the world was a dangerous place and thus their impulses lead them to make impulsive, emotional and irrational decisions. The beliefs and behavior of an authoritarian are suggested to be easily manipulated by authority instead of being based on internal values. Altmeyer also theorized that leaders with authoritarian personality types were more susceptible to the fundamental attribution error. There are many weaknesses associated with this syndrome and the F-scale. It may have been more relevant during the period in which it was produced, being shortly after World War II. The authoritarian personality is generally related to a fascist image; however, it is suggested to explain the behavior of individuals across all political ideologies.

=== Trait-based frameworks ===
Trait-based frameworks, excluding the Freudian approach, were suggested by James Barber (1930–2004) in The Presidential Character (1972) who highlighted the importance of psychobiography in political personality analysis. Barber suggested that leadership personality comprised three dimensions; "character", "world view", and "style". Barber also proposed that leadership typology followed a pattern leading from an individual's first political success and that it is includes two variables; the effort that a leader puts in and the personal satisfaction that the leader gains. This typology is fairly limited in its dimensions.

Etheredge (1978) proposed the importance of the traits; "dominance", "interpersonal trust", "self-esteem" and "introversion-extroversion", in leadership views and policy shaping. Etheredge found from studies on leaders during the Soviet Union, that those who scored highly on dominance were more likely to support the use of force during debate settlement. He found that the trait introversion can lead to a lack of co-operation, and that extroversion usually leads to cooperation and negotiation. Further he suggested that interpersonal trust and self-esteem were closely related to not advocating force.

Margaret Hermann (1976) introduced the Leader Trait Assessment (LTA) and advocated the development of the Profiler-Plus. The Profiler-Plus is a computer system used to code spontaneous interview answers for seven major characteristics; need for power, cognitive complexity, task-interpersonal emphasis, self-confidence, locus of control, distrust of others, and ethnocentrism. This method can profile large bodies of leadership related text whilst removing any subjective bias from content analysis. It is efficient and has high reliability. Hermann and Preston (1994) suggested 5 distinct variables of leadership style; their involvement in policy making, their willingness to tolerate conflict, their level and reasons for motivation, their information managing strategies, and their conflict resolving strategies.

An alternative approach is the Operational-Code method introduced by Nathan Leites (1951) and restructured by Alexander George (1979). The code is based on five philosophical beliefs and five instrumental beliefs. A Verbs in Context (VIC) coding system employed through the Profiler-Plus computer program once again allows substantial bodies of written and spoken speech, interviews and writings to be analyzed subjectively. The method attempts to be able to predict behavior thorough applying knowledge of various beliefs.

Although political behavior is governed and represented by a leader the consequential influence of the leader largely depends upon the context in which they are placed and in which type of political climate they are running. For this reason group behavior is also instrumental for understanding sociopolitical environments

== The political psychology of groups ==
Group behavior is key in the structure, stability, popularity and ability to make successful decisions of political parties. Individual behavior deviates substantially in a group setting therefore it is difficult to determine group behavior by looking solely at the individuals that comprise the group. Group form and stability is based upon several variables; size, structure, the purpose that the group serves, group development and influences upon a group.

=== Group size ===
Group size has various consequences. In smaller groups individuals are more committed (Patterson and Schaeffer, 1997) and there is a lower turnover rate (Widmeyer, Brawley and Carron, 1990). Large groups display greater levels of divergence (O'Dell, 1968) and less conformity (Olson and Caddell, 1994). Group performance also diminishes with size increase, due to decreased co-ordination and free-riding. The size of a political party or nation can therefore have consequential effects on their ability to co-ordinate and progress.

=== Group structure ===
The structure of a group is altered by member diversity, which largely affects its efficiency. Individual diversity with in a group has proven to demonstrate less communication and therefore to increase conflict (Maznevski, 1994). This has implications for political parties based in strongly colonial or multiracial nations. Member diversity has consequences for; status, role allocation and role strain within a group, all of which can cause disagreement. Thus, maintenance of group cohesion is key. Cohesion is affected by several factors; the amount of time members spend in the group, the amount that members like one another, the amount of reward that the group offers, the amount of external threat to the group and the level of warmth offered by leaders. These factors should be considered when attempting to form an efficient political group. President decision efficiency for example is affected by the degree to which members of the advisory group have a hierarchical status and by the roles that each member is assigned.

=== Group function ===
Studying the purpose for formation of a group, whether it is serving a "functional" purpose or an "interpersonal attraction" purpose (Mackie and Goethals, 1987), has implications for political popularity. Often people join groups in order to fulfill certain survival, interpersonal, informational and collective needs. A political party that provides; stability, clear information, offers power to individuals and satisfies a sense of affiliation, will gain popularity. Shutz's (1958) "Fundamental interpersonal relations orientation" theory suggests that groups satisfy the need for control, intimacy and inclusion. Groups also form due to natural attraction. Newcomb (1960) states that we are drawn to others close in socioeconomic status, beliefs, attitudes and physical appearance. Similarity in certain respects can thus be related to how much a person is attracted to joining one group over another.

=== Group development ===
Group development tends to happen in several stages; forming, storming, norming, performing, and adjourning (Tuckman, 1965). Group awareness of these stages is important in order for members to acknowledge that a process is taking place and that certain stages such as storming are part of progression and that they should not be discouraged or cause fear of instability. Awareness of group development also allows for models to be implemented in order to manipulate different stages. External influences upon a group will have different effects depending upon which stage the group is at in its course. This has implications for how open a group should be depending upon the stage of development it is at, and on its strength. Consistency is also a key aspect in a group for success (Wood, 1994).

=== The influence of conformity in groups ===
The application of conformity is key for understanding group influence in political behavior. Decision making within a group is largely influenced by conformity. It is theorized to occur based on two motives; normative social influence and informational social influence (Asch, 1955). Chance of conformity is influenced by several factors; an increase in group size but only to a certain degree at which it plateaus, and degree of unanimity and commitment to the group. Therefore, the degree of popularity of a political group can be influenced by its existing size and the believed unanimity and commitment by the public of the already existing members. The degree by which the group conforms as a whole can also be influenced by the degree of individuation of its members. Also, the conformity within political groups can be related to the term, political coalition. Humans represent groups as if there was a special category of an individual. For example, for cognitive simplicity, ancestral groups anthropomorphize each other because they have similar thoughts, values, and a historical background. Even though the member of a group may have an irrational or wrong argument about a political issue, there is a high possibility for the other members to conform to it because of the mere fact that they are in the same coalition.

=== The influence of power in groups ===
Power is another influential factor within a group or between separate groups. The "critical bases of power" developed by French and Raven (1959) allocates the following types of power as the most successful; reward power, coercive power, legitimate power, referent power and expert power. The way in which power is exerted upon a group can have repercussive outcomes for popularity. Referent power results in greater popularity of a political group or leader than coercive power (Shaw and Condelli, 1986). This has implications for leaders to manipulate others to identify with them, rather than to enforce consequential punishment. However, if coercive power is enforced, success and a trusted leader (Friedland, 1976) are necessary in order for group conflict not to escalate. Extrinsic punishment and reward are also suggested to detract from intrinsic motivation. A sense of freedom must be advocated to the group.

=== Decision-making in groups ===
Decision-making is an important political process which influences the course of a country's policy. Group decision-making is largely influenced by three rules; "majority-wins rule", "truth-wins rule", and "first-shift rule". Decision-making is also coerced by conformity. Irrational decisions are generally made during emotional periods. For example, an unpopular political party may receive more votes during a period of actual or perceived economic or political instability. Controversial studies by George Marcus (2003) however imply that high levels of anxiety can actually cause an individual to analyze information more rationally and carefully, resulting in more well-informed and successful decisions. The psychology of decision-making however must be analyzed in accordance with whether it is within a leadership context or a between-group context. The implementation of successful decision-making is often enhanced by group decision-making (Hill, 1982) especially if the decision is important to the group and when the group has been working together for an extended period of time (Watson, Michaelson and Sharp, 1991). However, groups can also hinder decision-making if a correct answer is not clear. Janis (1972) introduced the notion of Groupthink that advocates an increased chance of groups making faulty decisions under several conditions; strong group cohesion, isolation of group decision from public review, the presence of a directive leader in the group, and high-stress levels. Group polarization (Janis, 1972) suggests that group decision-making is often more extreme whether is it more risky or cautious. Groupthink refers to "a mode of thinking that people engage in when they are deeply involved in a cohesive in-group, when the members' striving for unanimity override their motivation to realistically appraise alternative courses of action."

Techniques to establish more effective decision-making skills in political dimensions have been suggested. Hirt and Markman (1995) claim that implementing an individual in a group to find faults and to critique will enable the members to establish alternative viewpoints. George (1980) suggested "multiple advocacy" which implements that a neutral person analyses the pros and cons of various advocate suggestions and thus makes an informed decision.

Applied psychology theories to improve productivity of political groups include implementing "team development" techniques, "quality circles" and autonomous workgroups.

== Using psychology in the understanding of certain political behaviors ==
=== Evolution ===
Evolutionary psychology plays a significant role in understanding how the current political regime came to be. It is an approach that focuses on the structure of human behavior claiming its dependence on the social and ecological environment. Developed through natural selection, the human brain functions to react appropriately to environmental challenges of coalitional conflict using psychological mechanisms and modifications. An example of political conflict would involve state aggression such as war. Psychological mechanisms work to digest what is taken in from internal and external information regarding the current habitat and project it in the most suited form of action such as acts of aggression, retrieval, dominance, submission and so forth.

=== Political identity and voting behavior ===
In order to make inferences and predictions about behavior concerning voting decision, certain key public influences must be considered. These influences include the role of emotions, political socialization, political sophistication, tolerance of diversity of political views and the media. The effect of these influences on voting behavior is best understood through theories on the formation of attitudes, beliefs, schema, knowledge structures and the practice of information processing. The degree to which voting decision is affected by internal processing systems of political information and external influences, alters the quality of making truly democratic decisions. Perceiving external events such as terrorist attacks, governmental warnings, and shifts in racial demography can lead to shifts in political opinion (Jost, 2017).

Some prominent academics in the field include Dr. Chadly Daniel Stern, who currently works at the Department of Psychology at the University of Illinois, Urbana Champaign. His research centers around answering social cognitive questions of how a person's political belief systems shape the way that they perceive the world and their everyday interactions.

=== Childhood influence ===
In 2006, scientists reported a relationship between personality and political views of Americans on a left–right spectrum as follows: "Preschool children who 20 years later were relatively liberal were characterized as: developing close relationships, self-reliant, energetic, somewhat dominating, relatively under-controlled, and resilient. Preschool children subsequently relatively conservative at age 23 were described as: feeling easily victimized, easily offended, indecisive, fearful, rigid, inhibited, and relatively over-controlled and vulnerable."

The amount of research done on children and the impact their childhoods have on their political views or identity is limited. However, an increasing amount of empirical work on children and their environment could be highly revealing of how their political awareness and attitudes develop very early on (Reifen‐Tagar & Cimpian, 2020).

=== Conflict ===
The application of psychology for understanding conflict and extreme acts of violence can be understood in both individual and group terms. Political conflict is often a consequence of ethnic disparity and "ethnocentrism" Sumner (1906).

On an individual level participators in situations of conflict can either be perpetrators, bystanders or altruists. The behavior of perpetrators is often explained through the authoritarian personality type. Individual differences in levels of empathy have been used to explain whether an individual chooses to stand up to authority or ignore a conflict. Rotter's (1954) locus of control theory in personality psychology has also been used to determine individual differences in reaction to situations of conflict.

Group behavior during conflict often affects the actions of an individual. The bystander effect introduced by Darley and Latane (1968) demonstrates that group behavior causes individuals to monitor whether others think it is necessary to react in a situation and thus base their behavior on this judgment. They also found that individuals are more likely to diffuse responsibility in group situations. These theories can be applied to situations of conflict and genocide in which individuals remove personal responsibility and therefore justify their behavior. Social identity theory explains that during the Holocaust of World War II political leaders used the Jews as an out-group in order to increase in-group cohesion. This allowed for the perpetrators to depersonalize from the situation and to diffuse their responsibility. The out-groups were held in separate confines and dehumanized in order to aid the in-group to disengage themselves from relating.

Research by Dan Kahan has demonstrated that individuals are resistant to accepting new political views even if they are presented with evidence that challenges their views. The research also demonstrated that if the individual was required to write a few sentences about experiences they enjoyed or spend a few moments affirming their self-worth, the individual was more likely to accept the new political position.

Although somewhat unusual, evolutionary psychology can also explain conflicts in politics and the international society. A journal article by Anthony C. Lopez, Rose McDermott and Michael Bang Petersen uses this idea to give out a hypothesis to explain political events. According to the authors, instincts and psychological characteristics developed through evolution is still existent with modern people. They suggest human being as "adaptation executers"; people designed through natural selection, and not "utility maximizers"; people who strive for utility in every moment. Though a group of people, perhaps those who are in the same political coalition, may seem as if they pursue a common utility maximization, it is difficult to generalize the theory of "utility maximizers" into a nation-view because people evolved in small groups. This approach helps scholars to explain seemingly irrational behaviors like aggressiveness in politics and international society because "irrational behavior" would be the result of a mismatch between the modern world and evolutionary psychology.

For example, according to evolutionary psychology, coalitional aggression is more commonly found in males. This is because of their psychological mechanism designed since ancestral times. During those times men had more to earn when winning wars compared to women (they had more chance of finding a mate, or even many mates). Also, the victorious men had more chance of reproduction which eventually led to the succession of aggressive, eager-to-war DNAs. As a result, the authors hypothesize that countries with more men will tend to show more aggressive politics thereby having more possibility of triggering conflicts within and especially among states.

Indeed, some exceptions do exist in this theory as this is just a hypothesis. However, it is viable enough to be a hypothesis to be tested to explain certain political events like war and crisis.

=== Terrorism ===
On an individual level terrorism has been explained in terms of psychopathology. Terrorists have demonstrated to show narcissistic personality traits (Lasch, 1979, Pearlstein, 1991). Jerrold Post (2004) argues that narcissistic and borderline personality disorders are found in terrorists and that mechanisms such as splitting and externalization are used by terrorists. Others such as Silke (2004) and Mastors and Deffenbaugh (2007) refute this view. Crenshaw (2004) showed that certain terrorist groups are actually careful in not enlisting those demonstrating pathology. The authoritarian personality theory has also been used as an explanation for terrorist behavior in individuals.

In terms of explaining reasons for which individuals join terrorist groups, motivational theories such as need for power and need for affiliation intimacy are suggested. Festinger (1954) explained that people often join groups in order to compare their own beliefs and attitudes. Joining a terrorist group could be a method to remedy individual uncertainty. Taylor and Louis (2004) explained that individuals strive for meaningful behavior. This can also be used to explain why terrorists look for such radical beliefs and demonstrations. Studies on children in northern Ireland by Field (1979) have shown that exposure to violence can lead to terrorist behavior later on. Implicating the effect of developing acceptable norms in groups. However this view has also been criticized (Taylor, 1998). Other theories suggest that goal frustration can result in aggression (Dollard, Doob. Miller, mower, and Sears, 1939) and that aggression can lead to frustration (Borum, 2004). Group settings can cause a social identity and terrorist behavior to manifest. Methods such as dehumanization allow individuals to detach more easily from moral responsibility, and group influence increase the chance that individuals will concede to conformity and compliance. Manipulations of social control and propaganda can also instrument terrorist involvement.

In fact, a strategic model has been proposed to examine the political motivations of terrorists. The strategic model, the dominant paradigm in terrorism studies, considers terrorists are rational actors who attack civilians for political ends. According to this view, terrorists are political utility maximizers. The strategic model rests on three core assumptions which are: (1) terrorists are motivated by relatively stable and consistent political preferences; (2) terrorists evaluate the expected political payoffs of their available options; and (3) terrorism is adopted when the expected political return is superior to those of alternative options. However, it turns out that terrorists' decision-making process does not fully conform to the strategic model. According to Max Abrahms, the author of "What Terrorists Really Want: Terrorist Motives and Counterterrorism Strategy", there are seven common tendencies that represent important empirical puzzles for the strategic model, going against the conventional thought that terrorists are rational actors.

== See also ==
- Category: Political psychologists
- Community psychology – Branch of psychology
- Experimental political science
- International Society of Political Psychology
- Leadership analysis
- Neuropolitics – Interdisciplinary field of study
- Political cognition – Topic in sociology
- Political economy – Study of the development of social production
- Public choice – Economic theory applied to political science
- Regality theory – Theory aiming to explain cultural differences based on perceived collective danger
