= Al Ulmer =

American intelligence officer (1916–2000)

Alfred C. Ulmer Jr. (August 26, 1916 – June 22, 2000) was an American intelligence officer. He was born in Jacksonville, Florida, in August 1916. He was of Swiss extraction on his father's side, his father having been born in Zurich. Ulmer graduated from Princeton University in 1939 and joined the United States Navy prior to the start of World War II, ultimately becoming a major head of intelligence operations during World War II. He married Doris Gibson Bridges and had three sons (Alfred III, James and Nicolas) and a daughter (Marguerite). He received the Intelligence Medal of Merit when he retired from his position in 1962. Ulmer then went on to business and in the 1980s joined the Swiss banking firm Lombard Odier et Cie. in Geneva, later setting up Lombard Odier's operations in Bermuda. He died on June 22, 2000, in Virginia Beach, Virginia.

== Career in intelligence ==
Ulmer began his career in intelligence as a major head of intelligence operations for the Navy during World War II. He then joined the Office of Strategic Services (OSS) in 1945 and oversaw operatives gathering information in Turkey, Egypt, Italy and Austria.

When the OSS was disbanded in 1945, Ulmer became head of the Strategic Services Unit (SSU) in Austria. There, Ulmer expanded his base of operations to include the whole Balkans area including such controversial places as Yugoslavia and Hungary. Although the SSU lacked the personnel to effectively carry out covert operations, Ulmer pushed for more money and was finally rewarded by a $150,000 annual budget. His glory at the SSU was short-lived, though, as the SSU was soon liquidated into the CIA by the new Central European Section chief, Richard Helms.

Ulmer was promoted to chief of the Far East division of the CIA's Directorate of Plans in 1955. At his new position Ulmer coordinated the overthrow of the president of Indonesia (Sukarno) in 1957. The main reason behind the rebellion was to rid Indonesia of its growing Communist Party. Ulmer was criticized for the failure of the rebellion and its intended sequel. He worked in Athens from 1952 to 1955 and in Paris from 1958 to 1962. Ulmer later went into business in London.

Ulmer and his wife, Doris, are briefly mentioned in the 1994 memoirs of Barbara Bush, the wife of former president George Herbert Walker Bush.

== Awards ==
Intelligence Medal of Merit

== Bibliography ==
- Persico, Joseph E. (1979). Piercing the Reich: The Penetration of Nazi Germany by American Secret Agents During World War II. New York: Ballantine. ISBN 978-0670554904.
- Prados, John (2006). Safe For Democracy: The Secret Wars of the CIA. Chicago: Ivan R. Dee. ISBN 978-1566638234.
- Weiner, Tim (2008). Legacy of Ashes: The History of the CIA (reprint ed.). New York: Anchor. ISBN 978-0-385-51445-3.
