= David O. Sullivan =

American intelligence officer

- Born: October 23, 1923; Alexandria, Virginia, U.S.
- Died: July 18, 2012 (aged 88); Chesapeake, Virginia, U.S.
- Education: American University
- Spouse: Mildred Lucille Carter
- Children: 3

David O. Sullivan (October 23, 1923 - July 18, 2012) was an American intelligence officer who worked for the Central Intelligence Agency for 22 years. He was the recipient of the Intelligence Medal of Merit.
