= Political sophistication =

Concept in political psychology

Political sophistication is a construct in the field of political psychology. It concerns the extent to which a person has knowledge of political activity, assimilates information and forms political views. One of the earliest uses of the term was by Robert C. Luskin in his paper Explaining Political Sophistication (1990).

Luskin writes "Terminology varies, but the name on which the literature seems to be settling on is political sophistication"

"A person is politically sophisticated to the extent to which his or her political cognitions are numerous, cut a wide substantive swath, and are highly organised, or "constrained"

Political sophistication has important implications for democratic theory. Luskin wrote in 1987 "that by anything approaching elite standards, the American public is extremely unsophisticated about politics and has not become appreciably more so over the last two and a half decades" adding that "other publics, abroad, are similarly unsophisticated." This low political sophistication he argues is damaging to the "democratic ideal" as "the less sophisticated the public, the less alert to its interests, the less active in pursuit of them" and crucially "the less resistant to manipulation from above"

Research in the field of political sophistication has focused on identifying the contributing factors to differing levels across public masses. Luskin investigated the effects of:

- exposure - what political information they receive
- motivation - their interest in learning about politics
- intelligence - their ability to assimilate and organise such information

He found that interest was the most influential variable to political sophistication summarising that "we learn about the things we care about" before continuing "education is probably the prime predictor of dependent variables reflecting political interest".

However the teaching of politics in UK schools has been a controversial topic. A report by OFSTED in the UK found that classes in citizenship that were made compulsory in 2002 were "something that teachers often shy away from – possibly because of the understandable concern that they will be perceived to demonstrate bias"

Other ways to increase political sophistication have been tested by John Gastill and James Dillard. They found a positive link between increasing political sophistication and increasing public deliberation through National Issues Forums.

Political sophistication has been shown to moderate political orientation. Researchers Becky L. Choma and Carolyn. L Hafer showed "that the association between explicit and implicit political orientation was moderated by political knowledge scores, such that the positive association was stronger among participants with a greater knowledge of politics."
