= Intelligence Medal of Merit =

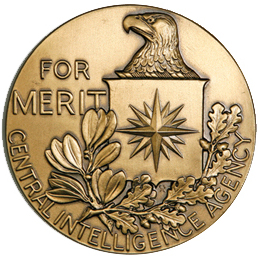
- Awarded for: "the performance of especially meritorious service or for an act or achievement conspicuously above normal duties which has contributed significantly to the mission of the Agency."
- Country: United States of America
- Presented by: Central Intelligence Agency
- Eligibility: Employees of the Central Intelligence Agency

Precedence
- Next (higher): Intelligence Star
- Next (lower): Distinguished Career Intelligence Medal

The Intelligence Medal of Merit is awarded by the Central Intelligence Agency for performance of especially meritorious service or for achievement conspicuously above normal duties.

== Notable recipients ==
- Gust Avrakotos
- I. Nathan Briggs
- George W. Cave
- Steven Abram Cash Served as CIA Operations Officer (1996-2001), Chief Counsel, Senate Select Committee on the Judiciary, Terrorism, Technology & Homeland Security Subcommittee (2001-2006), Senior Advisory to the Under Secretary for Intelligence & Analysis, U.S. Department of Homeland Security (2022-2025), Executive Director, The Steady State (2025-present)
- John Chambers (1923–2001) Hollywood make-up artist involved in Canadian Caper during 1979 Iran hostage crisis (aka Jerome Calloway)
- Charles Cogan
- Gene A. Coyle
- Peter Earnest
- Richard G. Fecteau
- Robert Gates
- Gina Haspel
- John J. Hicks, former director of National Photographic Interpretation Center; for his work during the Cuban Missile Crisis.
- J.B.E. Hittle
- Stephen Kasarda
- Mark Kelton, former deputy director of the National Clandestine Service for Counterintelligence
- George V. Lauder
- Harry E. Mason
- Edmund H. Nowinski (twice)
- James Olson
- Rufus Phillips
- Jerrold Post
- Robert Schaller
- James D. Skinner
- Frank Snepp
- John Stockwell
- Elizabeth Sudmeier
- David O. Sullivan
- Al Ulmer
- Charles Wilson, first non-Agency Officer to be awarded the Medal

== See also ==
- Awards and decorations of the United States government
