= Walther Poppelreuter =

German psychologist (1886–1939)

Walther Poppelreuter (also incorrectly written in the literature Walther Poppelreuther and Walter Poppelreuter; born 8 October 1886 in Saarbrücken; died 11 June 1939 in Bonn) was a German psychologist and neurologist. He dealt mainly with brain injuries of soldiers during the First World War and developed psychometric examination procedures that were used in the treatment of brain-injured patients and in industrial aptitude tests. He was among the first high school teachers who advocated openly for Nazism before the "seizure of power" (Machtergreifung). His psychometric tests are often used in visual neuropsychology, especially the Poppelreuter figure visual perceptual function test.

== Biography ==
The son of a high school director, Poppelreuter studied philosophy with a special emphasis on experimental psychology in Berlin and received his doctorate in 1908 in Königsberg. He then studied medicine and graduated in 1914. He came on as assistant to Gustav Aschaffenburg at the Psychiatric Hospital of Cologne, which during the First World War was the Cologne fortress hospital for head injuries.

In 1919, Poppelreuter moved to Bonn and became head of the newly founded "Institute for Applied Psychology" - trade station for German brain-injured war victims. In 1922, he received a position at the University of Bonn as an associate professor of clinical psychology. Poppelreuter's work on brain injury gave him high professional recognition. He developed a series of psychometric examination methods that were used in industrial psychology and vocational counseling. His clinical interest was given to the possible treatment of neuropsychological dysfunction.

Against his resistance Poppelreuter's "Brain-Injured Institute" moved in 1925 to Düsseldorf; however, it had been vacant since 1924. Poppelreuter had given himself a sabbatical in 1923/24 and turned to ergonomic issues at Gelsenkirchen mine association. In 1925, he became head of the Institute of Work Psychology at RWTH Aachen University and founded in 1928 on Adolf Wallichs guided chair for teaching a laboratory for industrial psycho-technique. Here he continued the experience he had gained from the inclusion of war-disabled in the rationalization of work processes in order.

In the winter semester 1931/32 he held a series of lectures on political psychology as applied psychology on the basis of Hitler's book Mein Kampf, which he in 1934 under the title Hitler, the political psychologist published. Hitler had told him in July 1932 in writing his joy that the first time his book will issue a lecture at a university.

In the Nazi period, Poppelreuter operated as a consultant of the National Socialist German Institute for Technical Work Research and Training in Düsseldorf. In Bonn, he served as Deputy Chairman of Psychology at the German Society. Shortly before his death, occupational and partisan judicial proceedings had been initiated against him for alcohol abuse and reprehensible means in a divorce dispute.

== Contributions to psychology ==
=== Poppelreuter's law ===
Poppelreuter's Law is a law of physiological training that states that when teaching a skill requiring both speed and accuracy, it is better in the early stages to limit speed and practice until a certain degree of accuracy has been attained, and then gradually increase the speed.

The law was invented and so named by Walther Poppelreuter in 1922. Subsequent research has invalidated the law, indicating that the neuromuscular patterns between the same activity performed slow and fast oftentimes are completely different and therefore unable to be trained simultaneously.

=== Poppelreuter figure visual perceptual function test ===
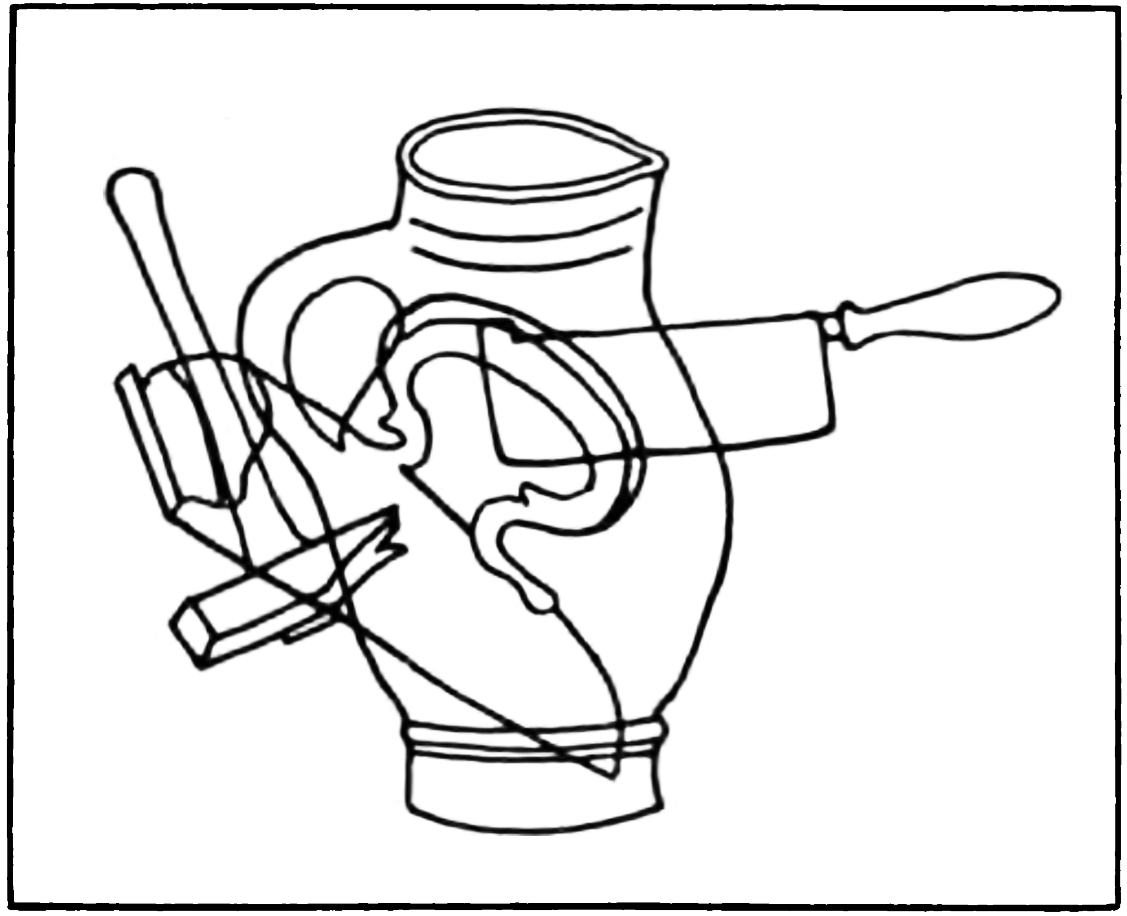
Poppelreuter overlapping figure

Poppelreuter invented the overlapping figures test in 1917 as one method of assessing brain injury incurred during World War I. It is typical for people with apperceptive agnosia to have difficulty with the overlapping figures, but not for people with associative visual agnosia.

== Honors and criticism ==
The Walther-Poppelreuter Medal was named in his honor. In addition, houses and streets were named after him. Poppelreuter's Nazi past was only noticed by the publication of a book on child euthanasia in the Bonn children's institution in the public consciousness. In 1990, Hannelore Kohl returned the Poppelreuter medal conferred in 1986.

In the district of Cologne Ostheim, there was a Poppelreuter Street since 1957. Due to Poppelreuter's involvement in Nazism, the road was renamed Josef-Poppelreuter Street, after the first director of the Roman division of the Wallraf-Richartz Museum.

Poppelreuter was responsible for leading the forced departure of Professor Dr. Med. Otto Lowenstein from his position at Bonn University and the children's psychiatric hospital (Rheinische Landesklinik fuer Jugendpschiatrie, which Lowenstein had founded in 1926) in Bonn three weeks after Hitler seized power in 1933. They both knew each other from service in the army during World War I. Poppelreuter became the director of the clinic by virtue of leading this action, which he justified on the basis of Lowenstein's Jewish ancestry. He used his connections with the Nazi party to deploy armed members of the party to force Löwenstein to flee. The events of this day are documented in the museum section of the Children's Psychiatric Hospital. These events led to the child euthanasia soon thereafter.
