= Etheredge =

Etheredge is a surname. Notable people with the surname include:

- Forest Etheredge (1929–2004), American educator and politician
- M. B. Etheredge (1915–2014), American World War II veteran
- Warren Etheredge, American interviewer, educator and film producer
