= International Psychohistorical Association =

- Formation: 1977

The International Psychohistorical Association was founded in 1977 in New York by Lloyd deMause, to focus on psychohistory as a science. The organization publishes Psychohistory News.
