= Edmund H. Nowinski =

American intelligence official (1944–2014)

- Born: Edmund Henry Nowinski; August 2, 1944; Newark, New Jersey, U.S.
- Died: January 19, 2014 (aged 69); Melbourne Beach, Florida, U.S.
- Education: Newark College of Engineering (B.S., electrical engineering, 1967)
- Occupations: Systems engineer, intelligence official
- Employer(s): Central Intelligence Agency; National Reconnaissance Office; Harris Corporation; Boeing
- Known for: Director of the NRO IMINT Systems Acquisition and Operations Directorate; Boeing program manager for the Future Imagery Architecture program

Edmund Henry Nowinski (August 2, 1944 – January 19, 2014) was an American systems engineer and intelligence official. Over a career of nearly three decades with the Central Intelligence Agency (CIA) and the National Reconnaissance Office (NRO), he played a key role in the design, development, and management of U.S. reconnaissance satellite and satellite communications systems. He later worked in the aerospace industry, including as Boeing's program manager for the NRO's Future Imagery Architecture (FIA) spy-satellite program, and was a two-time recipient of the CIA's Intelligence Medal of Merit.

== Early life and education ==
Nowinski was born in Newark, New Jersey, on August 2, 1944. He studied electrical engineering at the Newark College of Engineering, later part of the New Jersey Institute of Technology, receiving a Bachelor of Science degree in 1967.

== Career ==
=== Central Intelligence Agency and National Reconnaissance Office ===
Nowinski joined the CIA on June 11, 1967, as a research engineer in the Office of Special Projects within the Directorate of Science and Technology, working on early satellite reconnaissance systems that formed part of the National Reconnaissance Program. From 1967 to 1969 he served in the office's Design and Analysis Division; in late 1969 he moved to the system analysis staff, where he was responsible for overall system product quality and for analytical work on satellite systems.

Through the 1970s he held positions of increasing responsibility in satellite system design and development. In 1978 he became chief of the system analysis staff, and in 1980 he was promoted to deputy director of the Program Group overseeing major reconnaissance programs.

In August 1981, Nowinski was appointed director of the newly formed Data Communications Group in the Office of Development and Engineering (OD&E). In that role he oversaw the development and operation of several satellite-based communications systems that supported U.S. intelligence collection. In August 1985 he became deputy director of OD&E, with management responsibility for imagery intelligence, signals intelligence, and communications systems under the NRO's Program B, the CIA-managed portion of the National Reconnaissance Program.

Following a major reorganization of the NRO in December 1992, Nowinski served as the NRO's chief systems engineer. On October 3, 1993, he also became the executive director of NRO Program B, succeeding Julian Caballero; he held that post until October 16, 1995, during the final years before Program B was abolished as part of the shift to functional directorates.

On October 17, 1993, he was named director of the CIA's Office of Development and Engineering and, concurrently, director of the NRO's Imagery Intelligence (IMINT) Systems Acquisition and Operations Directorate. In this dual role he was responsible for acquiring, operating, and directing imagery satellite systems that supported the U.S. Department of Defense and the Intelligence Community. He served as IMINT director until July 30, 1995 and retired from the CIA on October 31, 1995.

During his CIA and NRO service, Nowinski received two CIA Intelligence Medals of Merit, the CIA's Distinguished Intelligence Medal, and National Reconnaissance Office medals for Exceptional and Superior Accomplishments.

=== Private sector and Future Imagery Architecture ===
After leaving government service, Nowinski joined Harris Corporation in Melbourne, Florida, as a vice president for business development, focusing on government space and intelligence programs. He later moved to Boeing in Seal Beach, California, where he became a vice president and program manager for the NRO's Future Imagery Architecture (FIA) program, intended to field a new generation of imaging reconnaissance satellites.

The FIA contract, awarded to a Boeing-led team in 1999, was described by the NRO as a core part of its future space-based architecture. Boeing announced that "Ed Nowinski" would serve as its FIA program manager.

The program later suffered major technical problems, delays, and cost overruns, and was cited in investigative reporting and government studies as one of the most expensive failures in the history of U.S. spy-satellite procurement. Press accounts reported that Boeing dismissed Nowinski as the project was restructured and portions of the work were transferred to other contractors. A later CIA publication noted that he served as Boeing's FIA program manager until 2005, when the contract was restructured.

After leaving Boeing, Nowinski returned to Florida and worked as a consultant to the aerospace industry.

== Writings and views ==
In 2006, Nowinski co-authored, with former OD&E director Robert J. Kohler, an article titled "The Lost Art of Program Management in the Intelligence Community" in the CIA's journal Studies in Intelligence. Drawing on their experience managing large reconnaissance programs, the authors argued that successful space and intelligence programs had historically relied on strong, technically competent government program offices and that, by the early 21st century, the Intelligence Community had lost much of this in-house capability. They linked problems on programs such as Future Imagery Architecture to an over-reliance on contractors and called for rebuilding a cadre of experienced government program managers and systems engineers.

The article has been cited in subsequent analyses of U.S. national security space acquisition and critiques of the defense industrial base.

In 1993 he served on NASA's Space Station Redesign Team that was tasked "to redesign the Space Station to be more efficient and effective, and to meet the new budget guidelines."

He completed MIT Seminar XXI as part of the Class of 1993.

== Awards and honors ==
- Two CIA Intelligence Medals of Merit.
- CIA Distinguished Intelligence Medal.
- National Reconnaissance Office Medal for Exceptional Accomplishment.
- National Reconnaissance Office Medal for Superior Accomplishment.

== Personal life ==
Nowinski was married to Judith Norulak; the marriage ended in divorce. He had two children and several siblings. He lived for many years in Melbourne Beach, Florida.

== Death ==
Nowinski died at his home in Melbourne Beach on January 19, 2014, from lung cancer. He was 69 years old.
