= Jerrold Post =

American psychiatrist (1934–2020)

Jerrold M. Post
- Born: February 8, 1934; New Haven, Connecticut, U.S.
- Died: November 22, 2020 (aged 86); Bethesda, Maryland, U.S.
- Education: Yale University (BA, MD)
- Occupations: Psychiatrist, professor
- Known for: Codification of political psychology
- Scientific career
- Fields: Psychiatry
- Workplaces: George Washington University, Central Intelligence Agency, McLean Hospital

Jerrold Morton Post (February 8, 1934 – November 22, 2020) was an American psychiatrist and author. He was an analyst for the Central Intelligence Agency (CIA) and the founder of the Center for the Analysis of Personality and Political Behavior. Post created a number of "psychobiographies" on notable individuals during his tenure at the CIA and is credited in some sources as inventing the field of political psychology.

== Biography ==
=== Early life and education ===
Jerrold Morton Post was born on February 8, 1934, in New Haven, Connecticut. His mother was Lillian (Chaikind) Post, the bookkeeper at a shoe store, and his father was Jacob Post, a seller of movie reels to local theaters. Post worked his way through Yale University, from which he received his undergraduate degree in 1956. He received his M.D. degree in 1960, also from Yale. He completed a two-year residency at Harvard Medical School that was followed by a two-year fellowship at St. Elizabeth's psychiatric hospital in Washington, D.C.

=== Career ===
In 1965, Post was preparing to accept a position at Harvard's McLean Hospital, when, through an acquaintance, he was recruited by the CIA, where he began developing psychological profiles of world leaders. After a career of 21 years at the CIA, in 1986, Post left to found a program of political psychology at George Washington University, where as a professor, he taught until 2015. In his time as a professor, he recruited John Kiriakou into the CIA. Kiriakou would later become a top counterterrorism officer in the CIA, and a whistleblower on the CIA's torture program.

He was the founder and director of the Center for the Analysis of Personality and Political Behavior. He also maintained a private practice in psychiatry out of his home in Bethesda, Maryland.

=== Personal life and death ===
Post was married to Sharon (Ruttenberg) Post until her death in 1975. He married Carolyn Ashland in 1978. He and his first wife had two daughters, Cynthia Post, a psychologist, and Meredith Gramlich, a disability specialist. Post also had a stepdaughter, Kirsten Davidson. His sister was Judith Tischler. He played backgammon, jazz piano and tournament bridge.

Post had kidney failure in his later years and went to a dialysis center weekly. He suffered a stroke in July 2020, and could no longer drive to dialysis, so he took a medical taxi where it is believed he contracted COVID-19. On November 15, he tested positive for COVID-19. Post died from the virus one week later, on November 22, 2020.

== Awards and honors ==
In 1979, Post won the Intelligence Medal of Merit. In 1980, he won the Studies in Intelligence Award. In 2002, he received the Nevitt Sanford Award for Distinguished Professional Contributions to Political Psychology. He was a Life Fellow of the American Psychiatric Association.

== Publications and articles ==
Post authored 14 books and scores of articles throughout his life. His last book was entitled, "Dangerous Charisma: The Political Psychology of Donald Trump and His Followers", which he co-authored with Stephanie R. Doucette. It was published one year prior to the 2020 election.

- Post, Jerrold M.; George L., Alexander (January 1, 2004). Leaders and Their Followers in a Dangerous World: The Psychology of Political Behavior. Cornell University Press. ISBN 978-0801441691.
- Post, Jerrold M. (March 23, 2005). The Psychological Assessment of Political Leaders: With Profiles of Saddam Hussein and Bill Clinton. University of Michigan Press. ISBN 978-0472068388.
- Post, Jerrold M. (2007). The Mind of the Terrorist: The Psychology of Terrorism from the IRA to al-Qaeda. Palgrave Macmillan. ISBN 978-1403966117.
- Post, Jerrold M. (November 17, 2014). Narcissism and Politics: Dreams of Glory. Cambridge University Press. ISBN 978-1107401297.
