= Psychobiography =

Psychology used to study historical people

Psychobiography aims to understand historically significant individuals, such as artists or political leaders, through the application of psychological theory and research.

Through its merging of personality psychology and historical evidence, psychobiography may be considered a historical form of therapeutic case study: it represents a growing field in the realm of biography. Psychopathography is sometimes used as a term to indicate that the person being analyzed was not mentally healthy, "path" coming from pathos (πάθος)—Ancient Greek for suffering or illness.

== Background ==
Psychobiography is a field within the realms of psychology and biography that analyzes the lives of historically significant individuals through psychological theory and research. Its goal is to develop a better understanding of notable individuals by applying psychological theories to their biographies to further explain the motives behind some of the subjects actions and decisions. Popular subjects of psychobiographies include figures such as Adolf Hitler, Vincent van Gogh, William Shakespeare, Martin Luther King Jr., Abraham Lincoln, and Saddam Hussein. A typical biography is often very descriptive, and tries to record every notable event that happened in a person's lifetime, whereas a psychobiography primarily focuses on some particular events, and tries to better understand why they happened. This field's potential has not only aided in developing a better understanding to many notable biographies throughout history, but has also inspired direction and insight into the field of psychology.

One of the first great examples of this field's utility was Dr. Henry Murray's report on the analysis of Adolf Hitler's personality during the end of World War II. Forced to psychoanalyze from a distance, Dr. Murray used multiple sources, including Hitler's genealogy, Hitler's own writings, and biographies of Hitler, so that the Allied forces could understand his personality to better predict his behavior. By applying a theory of personality that consisted of 20 psychogenic needs, Dr. Murray presumed Hitler's personality as "counteractive narcism", and was able to correctly predict the German leader's suicide in the face of his country's defeat. This work by Dr. Murray not only helped establish personality psychology as a behavioral science, but it also showed how the field of psychobiography could be applied as a means of psychoanalysis.

== Origins and development ==
Persons who have been the subject of psychobiographical research include Freud, Adolf Hitler, Sylvia Plath, Carl Jung, Vincent van Gogh, Martin Luther, Abraham Lincoln, Elvis Presley, Søren Kierkegaard, Friedrich Nietzsche, Andrew Jackson, Richard Nixon, and Ignatius of Loyola.

Major psychobiographical authors include Erik Erikson, James William Anderson, Henry Murray, George E. Atwood, and William Runyan.

Many psychobiographies are Freudian or psychodynamic in orientation, but other commonly used theories include narrative models of identity such as the life story model, script theory, object relations, and existentialism/phenomenology; and psychobiographers are increasingly looking for explanatory complexity through an eclectic approach.

Though there were other psychobiographies written before Freud's Leonardo da Vinci, A Memory of His Childhood in 1910, it is considered the most significant contribution of its time, despite its flaws. Psychobiographies about William Shakespeare (Jones, 1910), Giovanni Segantini (Abraham, 1912), Richard Wagner (Graf, 1911), Amenhotep IV (Abraham, 1912), Martin Luther (Smith, 1913), and Socrates (Karpas, 1915) were also published between 1910 and 1915, but are not as well known. Between 1920 and 1926, psychobiographies of Margaret Fuller (Anthony, 1920), Samuel Adams (Harlow, 1923), Edgar Allan Poe (Krutch, 1926), and Abraham Lincoln (Clark, 1923) were published by authors from a psychoanalytic perspective without a background in psychoanalysis. During the 1930s Tolstoy, Dostoevsky, Molière, Sand, Goethe, Coleridge, Nietzsche, Poe, Rousseau, Caesar, Lincoln, Napoleon, Darwin, and Alexander the Great were the subjects of psychobiographies, and soon afterward in 1943 a psychobiography of Adolf Hitler, predicting his suicide, was written during World War II, but was not published until 1972. Recent, significant contributions between 1960 and 1990 include psychobiographies of Henry James (Edel, 1953–72), Isaac Newton (Manuel, 1968), Mohandas Gandhi (Erikson, 1969), Max Weber (Mitzman, 1969), Emily Dickinson (Cody, 1971), Joseph Stalin (Tucker, 1973), James and John Stuart Mill (Mazlish, 1975), T. E. Lawrence (Mack, 1976), Adolf Hitler (Waite, 1977), Beethoven (Solomon, 1977), Samuel Johnson (Bate, 1977), Alice James (Strouse, 1980), Wilhelm Reich (Sharaf, 1983), and William James (Feinstein, 1984). Some psychobiographies at this time were also written about groups of people, focusing on an aspect they had in common such as American presidents, philosophers, utopians, revolutionary leaders, and personality theorists. These psychobiographies are the most well known, but since 1910 there have been over 4000 psychobiographies published.

As psychobiography gained recognition, authors from a variety of professions contributed their own work from alternate perspectives and varying methods of analysis of the psychobiographical subjects, significantly expanding psychobiography beyond the psychoanalytical perspective. Apart from psychoanalysts and psychiatrists who wrote the first psychobiographies, there have been historians, political scientists, personality psychologists, literary critics, sociologists, and anthropologists that have contributed to the growth of the field. Psychobiography has also conflicted with contemporary views of science since its origin because it contains no controlled variables or experimentation. In its early years it was dismissed as unscientific and not a legitimate addition to the field of psychology due to the push towards experimentation focused on physiological and biological factors, and away from philosophical psychology, to establish it as a natural science. The value of psychobiography to psychology is comparable to forensic science and archaeology, offering detailed analyses of subjects with an emphasis on contextual information, but due to the qualitative nature of this information it remains a challenge to validate psychobiographical works as empirically based applications of psychology.

== Methodology ==
The discipline of psychobiography has developed various methodological guidelines for psychobiographical study. Some of the most prominent are these:

1. The use of prototypical scenes in the life of the subject to serve as a model of their personality pattern
2. The use of a series of indicators of salience, markers such as primacy, frequency, and uniqueness of an event in a life, to identify significant patterns
3. The identification of pregnant metaphors or images that organize autobiographical narratives
4. Logical coherence or consistency as a criterion for adequate psychological interpretations

Scholars untrained in the discipline who do not follow these guidelines continue to produce psychobiographical studies.

== Contributors ==
=== Sigmund Freud ===
Sigmund Freud’s Leonardo da Vinci, A Memory of His Childhood (1910) is generally regarded as a foundational work of psychobiography, introducing the systematic application of psychoanalytic interpretation to a historical figure. Freud’s approach emphasized the influence of early experience, unconscious conflict, fantasy, and psychological development in understanding adult personality and creative activity. Although many of his specific interpretations, including aspects of his Leonardo study, have subsequently been challenged, the work established a model for investigating the relationship between personal history and later achievements. Psychoanalytic concepts continued to influence psychobiographical interpretation, even as the field expanded beyond Freud’s original theoretical framework.

=== Erik H. Erikson ===
Erik H. Erikson significantly expanded psychobiography through his theory of psychosocial development, emphasizing the relationship between identity formation, individual psychological conflicts, and historical circumstances. In Young Man Luther: A Study in Psychoanalysis and History (1958), he examined Martin Luther's religious development in the context of an identity crisis, relating personal struggles to broader religious and social transformations. His Gandhi's Truth: On the Origins of Militant Nonviolence (1969), which received the Pulitzer Prize and National Book Award in 1970, explored the psychological development of Gandhi's philosophy and practice of nonviolent resistance. Erikson's approach helped move psychobiography beyond interpretations focused primarily on childhood pathology toward an understanding of psychological development throughout life, including the creative resolution of conflict and its historical consequences.

=== Henry A. Murray ===
Henry A. Murray contributed to the foundations of academic psychobiography through personology, an approach emphasizing the intensive, longitudinal study of individual lives. His Explorations in Personality (1938) examined personality through interactions between psychogenic needs and environmental pressures, providing a framework for understanding psychological development in its individual and social contexts. Murray’s work at the Harvard Psychological Clinic helped establish the systematic study of lives within personality psychology. His sustained interest in Herman Melville produced psychoanalytic interpretations of Pierre and Moby-Dick, although his projected full-length psychobiography of Melville remained unfinished. During the Second World War, Murray also prepared a psychological assessment of Adolf Hitler for the Office of Strategic Services, illustrating an early application of personality analysis to political figures.

=== Lawrence J. Friedman ===
Lawrence J. Friedman contributed to psychobiography through historically grounded psychological biographies of major figures in psychoanalysis and mental health. His Menninger: The Family and the Clinic (1990) examined the relationship between family dynamics, individual personalities, and institutional development. In Identity's Architect: A Biography of Erik H. Erikson (1999), Friedman drew on archival materials and interviews to explore the connections between Erikson's personal identity struggles and his psychological theories. His subsequent The Lives of Erich Fromm: Love's Prophet (2013) extended this biographical approach to Fromm's intellectual development and historical circumstances. These studies illustrate the integration of historical research, psychological interpretation, and intellectual biography in examining the lives of influential psychological thinkers.

=== Alan C. Elms ===
Alan C. Elms contributed to the methodological development and wider recognition of psychobiography within personality psychology. His Uncovering Lives: The Uneasy Alliance of Biography and Psychology (1994) examined the relationship between psychological interpretation and biographical evidence, addressing criticisms of reductionism, speculative inference, and the pathologizing of historical figures. Through studies of personality theorists, writers, and political leaders, Elms demonstrated the application of psychological concepts to individual lives while emphasizing the importance of historical context and methodological rigor. His influential article "Freud as Leonardo: Why the First Psychobiography Went Wrong"(1988) examined methodological problems in Freud's interpretation of Leonardo da Vinci. In the "Psychobiography and Case Study Methods" (2007) chapter by Elms, he further addressed the place of individual case studies within personality research.

=== William Todd Schultz ===
William Todd Schultz contributed to contemporary psychobiography through methodological scholarship, editorial work, and psychological studies of creative individuals. As editor of the Handbook of Psychobiography (2005), he brought together theoretical and methodological approaches to the study of individual lives, including methods for identifying psychologically significant or prototypical scenes. He also edited the Oxford University Press Inner Lives series, supporting the publication of psychologically informed biographies. His own psychobiographical studies include Tiny Terror: Why Truman Capote (Almost) Wrote Answered Prayers (2011), An Emergency in Slow Motion: The Inner Life of Diane Arbus (2011), and Torment Saint: The Life of Elliott Smith (2013). In The Mind of the Artist: Personality and the Drive to Create (2022), Schultz further examined the relationship between personality traits, particularly openness to experience, and artistic creativity.

=== William McKinley Runyan ===
William McKinley (Mac) Runyan made significant contributions to establishing psychobiography as a systematic form of psychological and historical inquiry. His Life Histories and Psychobiography: Explorations in Theory and Method (1982) examined methodological challenges in interpreting individual lives and developed criteria for evaluating psychobiographical explanations. In “Why Did Van Gogh Cut Off His Ear? The Problem of Alternative Explanations in Psychobiography” (1981), Runyan analyzed competing interpretations of a single historical act, demonstrating the need to critically evaluate alternative explanations against available evidence rather than privilege a preferred psychological theory. His subsequent writings defended idiographic and case-study methods, addressing their scientific value and methodological rigor. In “Progress in Psychobiography” (1988), he examined how the field advances through new evidence, theoretical developments, and the critical reassessment of interpretations. His edited volume Psychology and Historical Interpretation (1988) further explored interdisciplinary approaches to understanding historical individuals and events.

=== Charles B. Strozier ===
Charles B. Strozier contributed to psychobiography through historically grounded psychoanalytic studies of political and intellectual figures. His "Lincoln’s Quest for Union: Public and Private Meanings" (1982) examined the relationship between Abraham Lincoln’s psychological development, personal relationships, and political leadership. He subsequently returned to Lincoln in "Your Friend Forever, A. Lincoln: The Enduring Friendship of Abraham Lincoln and Joshua Speed" (2016), exploring the psychological significance of their close relationship. Strozier also wrote "Heinz Kohut: The Making of a Psychoanalyst" (2001), examining the relationship between Kohut’s personal history, intellectual development, and formulation of self psychology. His writings on psychohistorical methodology include a critical examination of Erik Erikson’s concept of “disciplined subjectivity,” addressing the role of the researcher’s subjective experience in historical psychological interpretation.

=== Paul H. Elovitz ===
Paul H. Elovitz contributed to psychobiography through studies of American political leaders, institutional development, and documentation of the history of psychohistory and psychobiography. His psychobiographical research has examined American presidents and presidential candidates, frequently employing comparative psychological interpretations of personality, childhood experiences, leadership, and political behavior. He founded the Psychohistory Forum in 1982 and Clio's Psyche in 1994, establishing venues for interdisciplinary scholarship, research, and publication. His The Making of Psychohistory: Origins, Controversies, and Pioneering Contributors (2018) and the edited volume The Many Roads of the Builders of Psychohistory (2021) document the field's development and the work of its practitioners. Through published interviews, scholarly collections, and collaborative research initiatives, Elovitz has also contributed to preserving and documenting the intellectual and institutional history of psychohistory and psychobiography.

=== Dan P. McAdams ===
Dan P. McAdams contributed to psychobiography through his research on narrative identity and the psychological study of life stories. His theoretical approach examines how individuals construct evolving narratives that organize personal experience and provide a sense of identity, continuity, and meaning. His co-edited volume Psychobiography and Life Narratives (1988) helped connect psychobiographical inquiry with personality psychology and narrative research. In The Redemptive Self: Stories Americans Live By (2006), McAdams examined redemption narratives and their significance in American identity. He applied personality theory and narrative analysis to American political figures in George W. Bush and the Redemptive Dream: A Psychological Portrait (2011) and The Strange Case of Donald J. Trump: A Psychological Reckoning (2020). These studies illustrate the use of life-story analysis, personality traits, and motivational patterns in interpreting political leadership.

=== James William Anderson ===
James William Anderson contributed to the methodological foundations of contemporary psychobiography, particularly through his integration of psychoanalytic theory with historical and biographical research. His 1981 publications, “The Methodology of Psychological Biography” and “Psychobiographical Methodology: The Case of William James,” addressed the use of psychological theory, historical evidence, and interpretive inference in studying individual lives. His later work examined the relevance of contemporary psychoanalytic theories, including those of Winnicott, Kernberg, and Kohut, to psychobiographical interpretation. In Psychobiography: In Search of the Inner Life (2024), Anderson further developed a methodological approach emphasizing historical research, psychological complexity, the relationship between psychobiographers and their subjects, and the avoidance of reductionist interpretations. His psychobiographical studies have addressed figures in psychology, literature, politics, and the arts.

=== Joseph G. Ponterotto ===
Joseph G. Ponterotto contributed to psychobiography through research methodology, ethics, professional training, and the application of psychological theory to historical lives. His A Psychobiography of Bobby Fischer (2012) examined the chess champion's development through psychological, familial, cultural, and historical perspectives, demonstrating the use of multiple theoretical frameworks in psychobiographical interpretation. His methodological writings include “Best Practices in Psychobiographical Research” (2014) and, with Jason D. Reynolds, “Ethical and Legal Considerations in Psychobiography” (2017), addressing research standards, privacy, informed consent, and the responsibilities of psychobiographers. Ponterotto has also advocated incorporating psychobiography into psychology training and contributed to the expansion of transcultural approaches to the field. His The Psychobiographer's Handbook: A Practical Guide to Research and Ethics (2025) integrates methodological procedures, theoretical perspectives, and ethical considerations in conducting psychobiographical research.

=== Claude-Hélène Mayer ===
Claude-Hélène Mayer contributed to contemporary psychobiography through the integration of intercultural, existential, and positive psychology perspectives into the psychological study of individual lives. Her The Life and Creative Works of Paulo Coelho: A Psychobiography from a Positive Psychology Perspective (2017) examined psychological strengths, faith, and meaning-making across the writer's lifespan. In A Psychobiography of Viktor E. Frankl (2021), co-authored with Nataliya Krasovska, she applied existential and positive psychology concepts to the relationship between adversity, meaning, and personal development. Mayer also co-edited Psychobiographical Illustrations on Meaning and Identity in Sociocultural Contexts (2021) and Beyond WEIRD: Psychobiography in Times of Transcultural and Transdisciplinary Perspectives (2023), extending psychobiographical inquiry across cultural and disciplinary contexts. Her later studies have also examined the practical insights and lessons that may be derived from psychobiographical interpretations.

== Criticism ==
Psychobiography has faced criticism from the very start, crystallised above all in the production of what Erikson caricatured as "originology"—the explaining away of significant public events and actions as the product of some minute childhood detail.

Bad psychobiography—using mechanical psychologising, a selective mining of the facts, overdeterminism, and a tendency to pathologise—is considered easy to write. The haphazard historical evolution of the discipline has not helped reduce its prevalence.

== See also ==
- Psychopathography of Adolf Hitler
- Retrospective diagnosis
- Leadership Analysis
