= The Gaslight Effect =

2007 book by Robin Stern

The Gaslight Effect: How to spot and survive the hidden manipulation others use to control your life
- 1st edition, Morgan Road Books, 2007
- Author: Robin Stern
- Language: English
- Genre: Psychology
- Publisher: Morgan Road Books (2007), Harmony Books (revised edition 2018)
- Publication date: 2007
- Publication place: United States
- Pages: 260
- ISBN: 978-0-76792782-6

The Gaslight Effect: How to spot and survive the hidden manipulation others use to control your life, is a book by psychologist Robin Stern which has been credited with popularizing the term "gaslighting".

The book is based on Stern's experiences of treating patients within her practice. A foreword is provided by Naomi Wolf. It was first published by Morgan Road Books in 2007 with a second edition in 2018 by Harmony Books that included the role of gas lighting in politics. In the book, Stern outlines a "gaslight epidemic" which she attributes to the changing roles of women, particularly strong and smart women, and where men and women find it difficult "to disentangle themselves from employers, family members, spouses and friends who are clearly manipulative and cruel". She points out that it takes two to produce the gaslight effect, so "that the gaslightee holds the key to her own prison". She writes on how to recognize warning signs, and how to deal with them.

The book was analyzed in Ken Fuchsman's "Gaslighting" in The Journal of Psychohistory, in Paige L. Sweet's "The Sociology of Gaslighting" in the American Sociological Review, and in Cynthia A. Stark's "Gaslighting, Misogyny, and Psychological Oppression" in The Monist.

== Publication ==
The Gaslight Effect: How to Spot and Survive the Hidden Manipulation Others Use to Control Your Life is a book by psychologist Robin Stern, first published by Morgan Road Books in 2007. It has 260 pages, eight chapters and is preceded by acknowledgements and a foreword by Naomi Wolf.

A revised version, with the addition of the role of politics in gaslighting, was published in 2018 by Harmony Books. It has 304 pages covering 10 chapters and it is available to listen to on Audible narrated by Nan McNamara. The foreign language rights to the book were sold at The London Book Fair 2018 by Crown Publishing Group to Citic Press (China), Random House (Korea), Komplett-Media (Germany), Ankh-Hermes (Netherlands), Ping's Publications (Taiwan), and Editorial Sirio (world Spanish).

== Summary ==
In the foreword, Wolf describes how an incident between a father and child in a playground encouraged Stern to write about her experience of treating young women in emotionally abusive relationships, although clarifying that this type of abuse was not exclusive to women. The chapters revolve around the stories of three relationships; Katie and her protective but critical boyfriend Brian, Liz and her charming boss who leaves her out of major decisions, and Mitchell and his ridiculing mother. Respectively, the gaslighter boyfriend, boss and mother feel the need to be right and the gaslightee Katie, Liz and Mitchell idealize them while simultaneously seeking their approval.

Stern says in the book that "the gaslight effect results from a relationship between two people: a gaslighter, who needs to be right in order to preserve his own sense of self, and his sense of having power in the world; and a gaslightee, who allows the gaslighter to define {his or} her sense of reality because she idealizes him and seeks his approval." She points out that it takes two, "the mutual participation", to "dance" the "gas light tango", and to produce the gas light effect, making it such "that the gaslightee holds the key to her own prison". She proposes that if the gaslightee ignores the actions of the person with gaslighting behaviour and decides she is willing to live with his disapproval then the gaslight effect would fail; "there would be no gaslighting". Stern uses the term "gaslighters" to denote three categories of emotional abusers: the glamour gaslighter that at first charms before criticisms and jokes lead to the gaslightee apologising and feeling confused, the good-guy gaslighter who appears "nice" but gets their own way, and the easiest to recognize as the intimidator gaslighter who shows anger, threatens to leave or gives the silent treatment. The term "gaslightee" is used to describe the abused, who may be at one of three stages of the "gas light effect"; disbelief, defense or depression. Stern notes that, in her experience, where the relationship is between male and female, the victim is typically female and the perpetrator male.

According to the book, some gaslighters are so adamant in being correct that the only hope for the victim to be happy is to let go of that relationship. Stern notes how to recognize the warning signs, and describes how to deal with it. A description is given of the various techniques used by the gas lighter to gas light; covering up, masking with romantic gestures, maintaining appearances, using aggression, guilt-trips and yelling. To avoid the gas light tango, the book suggests to use silence instead of responding to provocation, writing down dialogues before reflecting upon them, and confiding in a trusted friend.

== Reception ==
The book is credited with popularizing the term "gaslighting". In 2019 it was analysed by psychohistorian Ken Fuchsman in "Gaslighting" published in The Journal of Psychohistory, in sociologist Paige L. Sweet's article "The Sociology of Gaslighting" in the American Sociological Review, and in professor of philosophy Cynthia A. Stark's paper "Gaslighting, Misogyny, and Psychological Oppression" in The Monist. It was also a topic of study for a master's thesis in the Faculty of Humanities at Utrecht University.

Fuchsman notes that Stern was inspired by seeing the effects of gaslighting in her own patients. In his review, Fuchsman notes that in the book, Stern focusses on what she calls the "gaslight epidemic", a phenomenon she describes as partly due to the changing roles for women, particularly strong and smart women, and where men and women find it difficult "to disentangle themselves from employers, family members, spouses and friends who are clearly manipulative and cruel".

Sweet noted that almost all the case studies in the book involve a male gaslighter and corresponding female gaslightee, despite Stern's claim that gaslighting is gender-neutral, therefore overlooking the fact that in Sweet's opinion gaslighting is primarily a sociological phenomenon enabled by "gender-based structural conditions" in society. Cynthia A. Stark "identif[ied] gaslighting with manipulative behavior, regardless of whether it is successful". In response to Stern's addition of the role of gaslighting in politics in the second edition, Fuchsman agrees that Stern's writing of "Trump as a model of a gaslighter is appropriate", whereas Sweet writes that "analyses that suggest Trump is gaslighting America go too far". Fuchsman correlates Stern's explanation of gaslighting to the 1964 Gulf of Tonkin incident, George W. Bush and the alleged weapons of mass destruction in 2001, and the first year of Donald Trump's presidency.

The Jewish Women International noted the book to be one of the first to explore gaslighting for a general audience. Journalist Ariel S. Leve quoted Stern in her article in The Guardian that "gaslighting over time leads to somebody experiencing the gaslight effect. Someone can try to gaslight you, but it can't happen unless you allow it." A summary of the book appeared in O, The Oprah Magazine.
