= Religious abuse =

Abuse administered through religion

Religious abuse is abuse administered through religion, including harassment, humiliation, spiritual abuse, or religious violence. Religious abuse may also include the misuse of religion for selfish, secular, or ideological ends, such as the abuse of a clerical position.

Religious abuse can be perpetuated by religious leaders or other members of a religious community. It can happen in any religion or faith. Some examples of religious abuse include using religious teachings to justify abuse, enforcing strict religious rules and practices that are harmful, shaming or ostracizing individuals who do not conform to religious norms, using religious authority to manipulate or control others, and denying access to medical care or other basic needs in the name of religion.

Religious abuse can have serious and long-lasting effects on individuals and communities, including psychological trauma, emotional distress, loss of faith, and even physical harm. It is important for individuals and religious communities to be aware of the signs of religious abuse and to take steps to prevent it from happening.

== Psychological ==
One specific meaning of the term religious abuse refers to psychological manipulation and harm inflicted on a person by using the teachings of their religion. This is perpetrated by members of the same or similar faith that includes the use of a position of authority within the religion. It is most often directed at children and emotionally vulnerable adults, and the motivations behind such abuse vary, and can be either well-intentioned or malicious.

Even well-intentioned religious abuse can have long-term psychological consequences, such as the victim developing phobias or long-term depression. The victim may have a sense of shame that persists even after they leave the religion. A person can also be manipulated into avoiding a beneficial action (such as a medical treatment) or to engage in a harmful behavior.

In his book Religious Abuse, pastor Keith Wright describes an example of such abuse. When he was a child, his Christian Scientist mother became very ill and eventually was convinced to seek medical treatment at an inpatient facility. Members of her church went to the treatment center to convince her to trust prayer rather than treatment, and to leave. She died shortly thereafter. While the church members may not have had any malicious intent, their use of their religion's teachings to manipulate Wright's mother ultimately resulted in her death.

A more recent study among 200 university students has shown that 12.5% of students reported being victimized by at least one form of religious or ritual abuse (RA). The study, which was published in the Journal of Interpersonal Violence, showed that religious/ritual abuse may result in mental health issues such as dissociative disorders.

Religious morality can in some cases contribute to victim blaming.

=== Against children ===
Religiously-based psychological abuse of children can involve using teachings to subjugate children through fear, or indoctrinating the child in the beliefs of their particular religion while suppressing other perspectives. Psychologist Jill Mytton describes this as crushing the child's chance to form a personal morality and belief system; it makes them utterly reliant on their religion or parents, and they never learn to reflect critically on the information they receive. Similarly, the use of fear and a judgmental environment (such as the concept of Hell) to control the child can be traumatic.

== Spiritual ==
Spiritual abuse includes:

- Psychological abuse and emotional abuse
- Physical abuse including physical injury (e.g., tatbir) and deprivation of sustenance.
- Sexual abuse
- Any act by deeds or words that shame or diminish the dignity of a person.
- Intimidation and the requirement to submit to a spiritual authority without any right to dissent.
- Unreasonable control of a person's basic right to exercise freewill in spiritual or natural matters.
- False accusations and repeated criticism by labeling a person as, for example, disobedient, rebellious, lacking faith, demonized, apostate, or an enemy of the church or of a deity.
- Isolationism, separation, disfranchisement, or estrangement from family and friends outside the group due to cult-religious, spiritual, or indigenous beliefs.
- Esotericism, hidden agendas, and requirements revealed to members only as they successfully advance through various stages of a faith.
- Enforced practice of spiritualism, mysticism, or other ideologies peculiar to members of that religion.
- Financial exploitation or enslavement of adherents.

=== Background ===
The term spiritual abuse was purportedly coined in the late twentieth century to refer to alleged abuse of authority by church leaders, albeit some scholars and historians would dispute that claim, citing prior literary appearances of the term in literature on religion and psychology. Lambert defines spiritual abuse as "a type of psychological predomination that could be rightly termed—religious enslavement". He further identifies "religious enslavement" as being a product of what is termed in the Bible "witchcraft" or "sorcery". A key element of the experience of spiritual abuse is the perceived 'divine position' of the abuser which leads to an environment of infallibility.

=== Characteristics ===
Ronald Enroth in Churches That Abuse identifies five categories:

1. Authority and power: Abuse arises when leaders of a group arrogate to themselves power and authority that lacks the dynamics of open accountability and the capacity to question or challenge decisions made by leaders. The shift entails moving from general respect for an office bearer to one where members loyally submit without any right to dissent.
2. Manipulation and control: Abusive groups are characterized by social dynamics where fear, guilt, or threats are routinely used to produce unquestioning obedience, group conformity, or stringent tests of loyalty. The leader–disciple relationship may become one in which the leader's decisions control and usurp the disciple's right or capacity to make choices.
3. Elitism and persecution: Abusive groups depict themselves as unique and have a strong organizational tendency to be separate from other bodies and institutions. The social dynamism of the group involves being independent or separate, with diminishing possibilities for internal correction, reflection, or external criticism.
4. Life-style and experience: Abusive groups foster rigidity in behavior and belief that requires conformity to the group's ideals.
5. Dissent and discipline: Abusive groups tend to suppress any kind of internal challenge to decisions made by leaders.

Agnes and John Lawless argue in The Drift into Deception that there are eight characteristics of spiritual abuse, and some of these clearly overlap with Enroth's criteria. They list the eight marks of spiritual abuse as comprising:

1. Charisma and pride
2. Anger and intimidation
3. Greed and fraud
4. Immorality
5. Enslaving authoritarian structure
6. Exclusivity
7. Demanding loyalty and honor
8. New revelation

The author of Charismatic Captivation, Steven Lambert, in a post on the book's website delineates "33 Signs of Spiritual Abuse", including:

1. Apotheosis or de facto deification of the leadership.
2. Absolute authority of the leadership.
3. Pervasive abuse and misuse of authority in personal dealings with members to coerce submission.
4. Paranoia, inordinate egotism, or narcissism, and insecurity by the leaders.
5. Abuse and inordinate incidence of "church discipline" particularly in matters not expressly considered to be church discipline issues.
6. Inordinate attention to maintaining the public image of the ministry and lambasting of all "critics".
7. Constant indoctrination with a "group" or "family" mentality that impels members to exalt the corporate "life" and goals of the church-group over their personal goals, callings, objectives, or relationships.
8. Members are psychologically traumatized, terrorized, and indoctrinated with numerous fears aimed at creating an over-dependence or codependence on their leaders and the corporate group.
9. Members may be required to obtain the approval (or witness) of their leader(s) for decisions regarding personal matters.
10. Frequent preaching from the pulpit discouraging leaving the religion or disobeying the leaderships' dictates.
11. Members departing without the blessing of the leadership do so under a cloud of suspicion, shame, or slander.
12. Departing members often suffer from psychological problems and display the symptoms associated with post-traumatic stress disorder (PTSD).

=== Research and examples ===
Flavil Yeakley's team of researchers conducted field-tests with members of the Boston Church of Christ using the Myers-Briggs Type Indicator. In The Discipling Dilemma Yeakley reports that the members tested "showed a high level of change in psychological type scores", with a "clear pattern of convergence in a single type". The same tests were conducted on five mainline denominations and with six groups that are popularly labeled as cults or manipulative sects. Yeakley's test results showed that the pattern in the Boston Church "was not found among other churches of Christ or among members of five mainline denominations, but that it was found in studies of six manipulative sects." The research did not show that the Boston Church was "attracting people with a psychological need for high levels of control", but Yeakley concluded that "they are producing conformity in psychological type" which he deemed to be "unnatural, unhealthy, and dangerous."

This was not a longitudinal study and relied on asking participants to answer the survey three times; once as they imagined they might answer five years prior, once as their present selves, and once as they imagined they might answer after five years of influence in the sect. The author insists that despite this, "any significant changes in the pattern of these perceptions would indicate some kind of group pressure. A high degree of change and a convergence in a single type would be convincing proof that the Boston Church of Christ has some kind of group dynamic operating that tends to produce conformity to the group norm." However it could instead indicate a desire on the part of the respondents to change in the direction indicated. To determine actual changes in MBTI results would require a longitudinal study, since the methodology here was inherently suggestive of its conclusion. This is also amply borne out in its instructions: "The instructions stated clearly that no one was telling them that their answers ought to change. The instructions said that the purpose of the study was simply to find out if there were any changes and, if so, what those changes might indicate."

== Physical ==
Physical abuse in a religious context can take the form of beatings, illegal confinement, neglect, near-drowning, or even murder in the belief that the child is possessed by evil spirits, practicing sorcery or witchcraft, or has committed some kind of sin that warrants punishment. Such extreme cases are, though, rare.

In 2012, the United Kingdom's Department for Children, Schools, and Families instituted a new action plan to investigate the issue of faith-based abuse after several high-profile murders, such as that of Kristy Bamu. Over a term of 10 years, Scotland Yard conducted 83 investigations into allegations of abuse with faith-based elements and feared there were even more that were unreported.

== Violence ==
Religious violence and extremism (also called communal violence) is a term that covers all phenomena where religion is either the subject or object of violent behavior.

=== Human sacrifice ===
Human sacrifice (sometimes called ritual murder) has been practiced on a number of different occasions and in many different cultures. The various rationales behind human sacrifice are the same that motivate religious sacrifice in general. Human sacrifice is typically intended to bring good fortune and to pacify the gods. Fertility was another common theme in ancient religious sacrifices.

Human sacrifice may be a ritual practiced in a stable society, and may even be conducive to enhance societal unity, both by creating a bond unifying the sacrificing community, and in combining human sacrifice and capital punishment, by removing individuals that have a perceived negative effect on societal stability (criminals, religious heretics, foreign slaves, or prisoners of war). However, outside of civil religion, human sacrifice may also result in outbursts of blood frenzy and mass killings that destabilize society.

Archaeology has uncovered physical evidence of child sacrifice at several locations. Some of the best attested examples are the diverse rites which were part of the religious practices in Mesoamerica and the Inca Empire. Psychologists Alice Miller and Robert Godwin, psychohistorian Lloyd deMause, and other advocates of children's rights have written about pre-Columbian sacrifice within the framework of child abuse.

Plutarch (c. 46–120 AD) mentions the Carthaginian's ritual burning of small children, as do Tertullian, Orosius, Diodorus Siculus, and Philo. Livy and Polybius do not. There is no conclusive archaeological evidence for Carthaginian child sacrifice but the occurrence of the practise has not been ruled out. The Hebrew Bible also mentions what appears to be child sacrifice practised at a place called the Tophet (roasting place) by the Canaanites, and by some Israelites.

Children were thrown to the sharks in ancient Hawaii.

Sacrificial victims were often infants. "The slaughtering of newborn babies may be considered a common event in many cultures" including the Eskimo, the Polynesians, the Ancient Egyptians, the Chinese, the Scandinavians, and various indigenous peoples of Africa, the Americas and Australia.

=== Initiation rites ===
Artificial deformation of the skull predates written history and dates back as far as 45,000 BCE, as evidenced by two Neanderthal skulls found in Shanidar Cave. It was usually started just after birth and continued until the desired shape was achieved. It may have played a key role in Egyptian and Mayan societies.

In China some boys were castrated, with both the penis and scrotum cut. Anthropologists have described other ritual actions. Géza Róheim wrote about initiation rituals performed by Australian natives in which adolescent initiates were forced to drink blood.

=== Modern practices ===
In the rituals of some tribes in Papua New Guinea, an elder "picks out a sharp stick of cane and sticks it deep inside a boy's nostrils until he bleeds profusely into the stream of a pool, an act greeted by loud war cries." Afterward, when boys are initiated into puberty and manhood, they are expected to perform fellatio on the elders. "Not all initiates will participate in this ceremonial homosexual activity but, about five days later, several will have to perform fellatio several times."

Individual cases of ritual murder have been recorded in Brazil, the United States, Singapore (Toa Payoh ritual murders), and Uganda.

=== Witch hunts ===
To this day, witch hunts, trials, and accusations are still a real danger in some parts of the world. Trials result in violence against men, women, and children, including murder. In The Gambia, about 1,000 people accused of being witches were locked in government detention centers in March 2009, beaten, forced to drink an unknown hallucinogenic potion, and confess to witchcraft, according to Amnesty International. In Tanzania, thousands of elderly Tanzanian women have been strangled, knifed to death, and burned alive over the last two decades after being denounced as witches. Ritualistic abuse may also involve children accused of, and punished for, being purported witches in some Central African areas. A child may be blamed for the illness of a relative, for example. Other examples include Ghana, where alleged witches were banished to refugee camps, and the beating and isolation of children accused of being witches in Angola.

=== Psychohistorical explanation ===
A small number of academics subscribe to the theory of psychohistory and attribute the abusive rituals to the psychopathological projection of the perpetrators, especially the parents.

This psychohistorical model claims that practices of tribal societies sometimes included incest and the sacrifice, mutilation, rape, and torture of children, and that such activities were culturally acceptable.

== Survivors ==
Survivors of religious abuse can develop symptoms of post-traumatic stress disorder (PTSD) in response to their abusive religious experiences. Dr. Marlene Winell, a psychologist and former fundamentalist, coined the term religious trauma syndrome (RTS) in a 2011 article she wrote for the British Association for Behavioural and Cognitive Psychotherapies. Winell describes RTS as "the condition experienced by people who are struggling with leaving an authoritarian, dogmatic religion and coping with the damage of indoctrination."

In the article, Winell identifies four categories of dysfunction: cognitive, affective, functional, and social/cultural.

- Cognitive: Confusion, difficulty with decision-making and critical thinking, dissociation, identity confusion
- Affective: Anxiety, panic attacks, depression, suicidal ideation, anger, grief, guilt, loneliness, lack of meaning
- Functional: Sleep and eating disorders, nightmares, sexual dysfunction, substance abuse, somatization
- Social/cultural: Rupture of family and social network, employment issues, financial stress, problems acculturating into society, interpersonal dysfunction

These symptoms can occur for people who have simply participated in dogmatic expressions of religion, such as fundamentalism. Extreme cases of religious abuse such as authoritarian cult membership, clergy sexual abuse, or mind control tactics used to extremes like the mass suicide at Jonestown may attract public scrutiny. However, individuals can experience chronic religious abuse in the subtle mind-control mechanics of fundamentalism that leads to trauma. While many extreme traumatic experiences associated with religion can cause simple PTSD, scholars are now arguing that chronic abuse through mind control tactics used in fundamentalist settings, whether intentional or not, can induce C-PTSD or developmental trauma.

Exposure therapy or staying in religiously abusive settings may not be conducive to healing for survivors of religious abuse. Healing can come through support groups, therapy, and psychoeducation. In some cultures, survivors have opportunities to recover and live vibrant lives after they leave religiously abusive settings.

== See also ==
- Christina Krüsi – Swiss writer and artist
- Exorcism – Evicting spiritual entities from a person or area
- Forced conversion – Adoption of a different religion or irreligion under duress
- Godly Response to Abuse in the Christian Environment – Non-profit organization focused on combatting abuse in Christian organizations
- Infanticide – Intentional killing of human offspring
- List of satanic ritual abuse allegations
- Religious persecution – Persecution based on religious belief
- Religious trauma syndrome – Lingering symptoms of controlling belief systems
- Scientology controversies
- Self-flagellation – Whipping oneself as part of a religious ritual
- Sexual abuse by yoga gurus – Alleged sexual abuse by yoga gurus
- Shunning – Act of social rejection, or emotional distance
- Social abuse – Abuse that tries to cut off the victim from their social network
- The Dark Pictures Anthology: Little Hope – 2020 video game
- Theological veto – Concept in philosophy of religion
- Shūkyō nisei – Japanese children with extremely religious parents

== Cited sources ==
- deMause, Lloyd (2002). The Emotional Life of Nations. NY, London: Karnak. ISBN 9781892746986.
- Godwin, Robert W. (2004). One cosmos under God. St. Paul: Paragon House. ISBN 9781557788368.
- Lambert, Steven (1996). Charismatic Captivation, Authoritarian Abuse & Psychological Enslavement in Neo-Pentecostal Churches. Real Truth Publications.
- Pasquale, T. (2015). Sacred Wounds: A Path to Healing from Spiritual Trauma. Chalice Press.
- Yeakley, Flavil (1988). The Discipling Dilemma (2nd ed.). Nashville: Gospel Advocate Company. ISBN 0-89225-311-8.
