= Sacrifice of the intellect =

The sacrifice of the intellect (sacrificium intellectus, sometimes rendered in Italian, sacrificio dell'intelletto) is a concept associated with Christian devotion, and particularly with the Jesuit order.

The original idea can be traced back to the Bible, in particular to Paul the Apostle's Second Epistle to the Corinthians 10:5.

It was the "third sacrifice" demanded by the founder of the Jesuits, St. Ignatius Loyola, who required

besides entire outward submission to command, also the complete identification of the inferior's will with that of the superior. [Loyola] lays down that the superior is to be obeyed simply as such and as standing in the place of God, without reference to his personal wisdom, piety or discretion; that any obedience which falls short of making the superior's will one's own, in inward affection as well as in outward effect, is lax and imperfect; that going beyond the letter of command, even in things abstractly good and praise-worthy, is disobedience, and that the "sacrifice of the intellect" is the third and highest grade of obedience, well pleasing to God, when the inferior not only wills what the superior wills, but thinks what he thinks, submitting his judgment, so far as it is possible for the will to influence and lead the judgment.

The concept was taken up in a more individualistic sense by the Jansenist thinker Blaise Pascal, and particularly by the existentialist thinker Søren Kierkegaard, who thought that the act of faith requires a leap into the void, which amounts to a sacrifice of the intellect and reason. This was quintessentially expressed in the traditional dictum, credo quia absurdum, "I believe because it is absurd." This view of faith is rejected by the Catholic church, which regards reason as a path towards direct knowledge of God.

The phrase is often used in a pejorative sense in writings on the psychology and sociology of religion, e.g.:

- Max Weber states: "There is absolutely no 'unbroken' religion working as a vital force, which is not compelled at some point to demand the credo non quod, sed credo quia absurdum - the 'sacrifice of the intellect.'"
- According to Paul Pruyser, "Sacrifice of the intellect, demanded by a good many religious movements and blithely if not joyously made by a good many religious persons, is surely one of the ominous features of neurotic religion."

== Sacrifice of the intellect and quantum mechanics ==
In 1926, Erwin Schrödinger used sacrificium intellectus in the pejorative sense to describe the Albert Einstein's gas theory based on the independent particle nature of gas molecules and to propose a need for considering the wave nature of gas molecules in terms of wave mechanics.

In the new gas theory recently developed by A. Einstein, this surely counts, in general, as the essential point, namely, that an entirely new kind of statistics, the so-called Bose statistics, are to be applied to the movements of gas molecules. One's natural instinct rightly resists viewing this new statistics as something primary, incapable of further explanation. On the contrary, there seems to be disguised within it the assumption of a certain dependence of the gas molecules upon one another, or an interaction between them, which nevertheless in this form can only be analyzed with difficulty.

One may expect that a deeper insight into the real essence of the theory would be obtained if it were able to leave as it was the old statistical method, which has been tested in experience and is logically well-founded, and were to undertake a change in the foundations in a place where it is possible without a sacrificium intellectus.

== See also ==
- Theological veto
