= Robin Stern =

American psychoanalyst

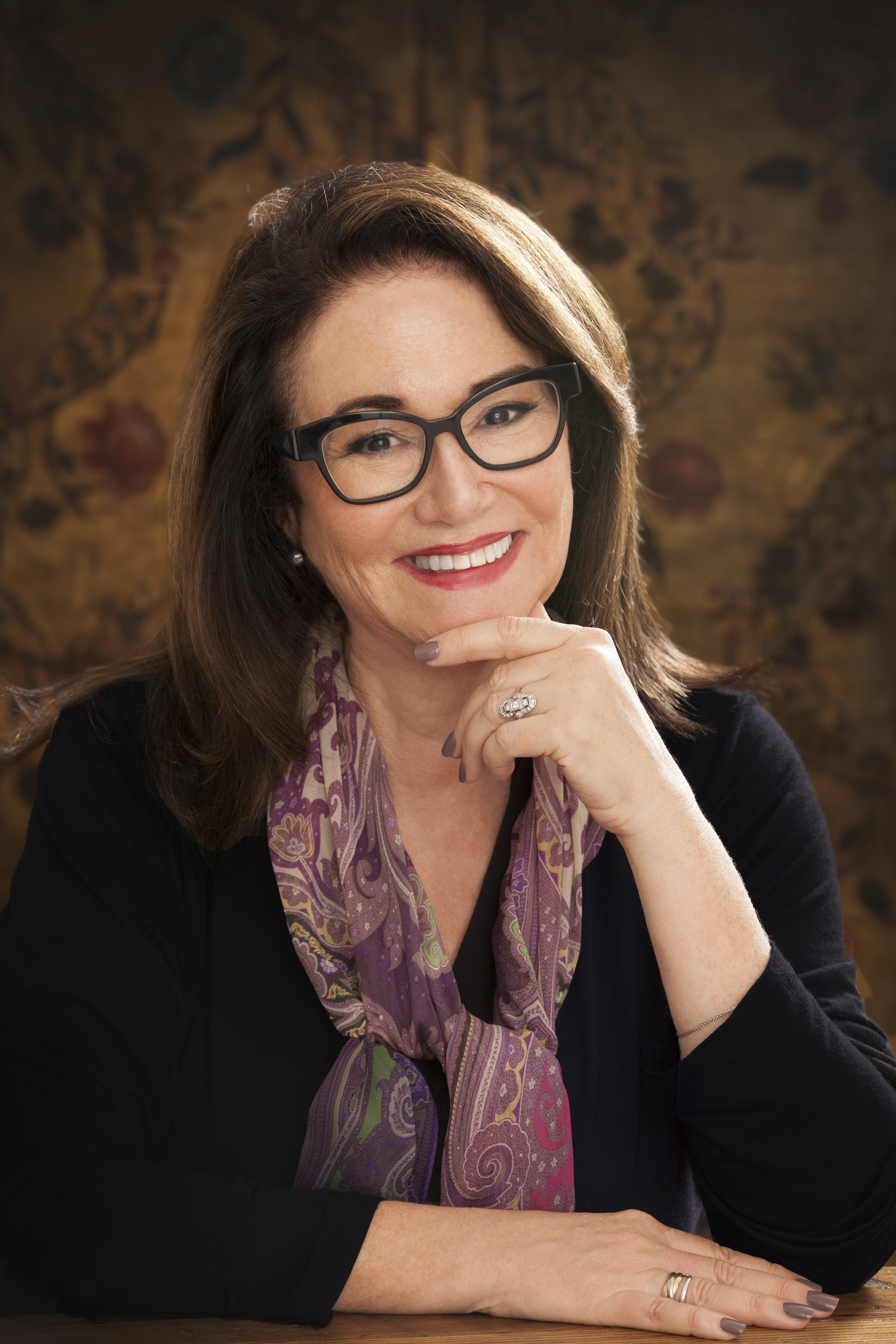

Academic background
- Education: New York University (BA, PhD); New School for Social Research (MA)

Academic work
- Discipline: Psychoanalyst
- Institutions: Yale University
- Main interests: Emotional intelligence; Gaslighting
- Notable works: The Gaslight Effect (2007)

Robin Stern is an American psychoanalyst at Yale University, associate director for the Yale Center for Emotional Intelligence, an associate research scientist at the Yale Child Study Center, and is on the faculty of Teachers College, Columbia University.

Her publications include the books The Gaslight Effect (2007) and Project Rebirth (2011). Her research includes looking at gratitude and its effects on healing, and a large study examining the effects of negative and positive emotions in students in the US.

== Education ==
Stern graduated with a bachelor's degree in psychology from New York University. She received a master's degree in personality and social development from The New School for Social Research, and a PhD in applied psychology and research design from New York University. She gained a post-doctoral certificate in psychoanalytic group psychotherapy from the Postgraduate Center for Mental Health.

== Career ==
Stern is a psychoanalyst at Yale University, associate director for the Yale Center for Emotional Intelligence, an associate research scientist at the Child Study Center at Yale, and on the faculty of Teachers College, Columbia University, where she teaches on emotional intelligence, gender and technology. She co-founded of the Woodhull Institute, created to educate women leaders, and the Inner Resilience Program, established to educate on resilience, created after the September 11 attacks in the United States.

Her publications include the books The Gaslight Effect (2007), in which she describes gaslighting as a "tango" that requires two people, usually a female who idealizes and seeks approval from a male, who in turn needs to be right and manipulates her thoughts in order to retain power. According to Ken Fuchsman, writing in The Journal of Psychohistory, Stern was one person who brought the term 'gaslighting' to more widespread attention and he described her book as "essential reading in the age of Trump". In 2011 she published Project Rebirth, which traces the lives of eight people directly affected by the September 11 attacks.

In 2013 she co-authored, with Robert A. Emmons, a paper titled "Gratitude as a Psychotherapeutic Intervention", published in the Journal of Clinical Psychology, in which they wrote that gratitude “may spontaneously catalyze healing processes,” and that, “relatively easy techniques can be included to increase gratitude alongside existing clinical interventions.” They noted that grateful people were better able to deal with stress, recovered more swiftly from illness and were physically stronger.

In 2018, Stern contributed to a study that involved gathering data on negative and positive emotions from over 19,000 grade 9-12 students in the US in 2015, recruited through social media, schools, youth organizations and with the assistance of Lady Gaga, who spoke on behalf of LGBTQ youth. The study showed that due to bullying, LGBTQ students have more negative school experiences than their non-LGBTQ counterparts. The same study showed that students who have both a gender and sexual minority identity such as a lesbian transgender girl, experience bullying more frequently and report positive experiences in school the least, when compared to students with either a gender or sexual minority identity.

She was a mentor to Courtney E. Martin.

== Personal and family ==
Stern lives in New York and has two children.

== Selected publications ==
=== Articles ===
- Emmons, Robert A.; Stern, Robin (2013). "Gratitude as a Psychotherapeutic Intervention". Journal of Clinical Psychology. 69 (8): 846–855. doi:10.1002/jclp.22020. ISSN 1097-4679. PMID 23775470.
- White, Arielle E.; Moeller, Julia; Ivcevic, Zorana; Brackett, Marc A.; Stern, Robin (November 1, 2018). "LGBTQ Adolescents' Positive and Negative Emotions and Experiences in U.S. High Schools". Sex Roles. 79 (9): 594–608. doi:10.1007/s11199-017-0885-1. ISSN 1573-2762. S2CID 148852106.

=== Books ===
- Shelton, Claudia Marshall; Stern, Robin (2004). Understanding Emotions in the Classroom: Differentiating Teaching Strategies for Optimal Learning. National Professional Resources Inc./Dude Publishing. ISBN 1-887943-65-X.
- Stern, Robin (2007). The Gaslight Effect: How to Spot and Survive the Hidden Manipulation Others Use to Control Your Life. Harmony. ISBN 978-0767924450.
- Stern, Robin; Martin, Courtney E. (2011). Project Rebirth: Survival and the Strength of the Human Spirit from 9/11 Survivors. Dutton. ISBN 9781101543481.
- Stern, Robin (2023). The Gaslight Effect Recovery Guide. Penguin Random House/Rodale Books. ISBN 9780593236277.
