= Early infanticidal childrearing =

Term used in the study of psychohistory

Early infanticidal childrearing is a term used in the study of psychohistory that refers to infanticide in Paleolithic, pre-historical, and historical hunter-gatherer tribes or societies. "Early" means early in history or in the cultural development of a society, not to the age of the child. "Infanticidal" refers to the high incidence of infants killed when compared to modern nations. The model was developed by Lloyd deMause within the framework of psychohistory as part of a seven-stage sequence of childrearing modes that describe the development attitudes towards children in human cultures The word "early" distinguishes the term from late infanticidal childrearing, identified by deMause in the more established, agricultural cultures up to the ancient world.

== The model ==
This model is a psychological concept that aims to understand anthropological data, especially from such societies as the Yolngu of Australia, the Gimi, Wogeo, Bena Bena, and Bimin-Kuskusmin of Papua New Guinea, the Raum, the Ok, and the Kwanga, based on observations by Géza Róheim, Lia Leibowitz, Robert C. Suggs, Milton Diamond, Herman Heinrich Ploss, Gilbert Herdt, Robert J. Stoller, L. L. Langness, and Fitz John Porter Poole, among others. While anthropologists and psychohistorians do not dispute the data, they dispute its significance in terms of its importance, its meaning, and its interpretation.

Supporters attempt to explain cultural history from a psycho-developmental point of view, and argue that cultural change can be assessed as "advancement" or "regression" based on the psychological consequences of various cultural practices. While most anthropologists reject this approach and most theories of cultural evolution as ethnocentric, psychohistorians proclaim the independence of psychohistory and reject the mainstream Boasian view.

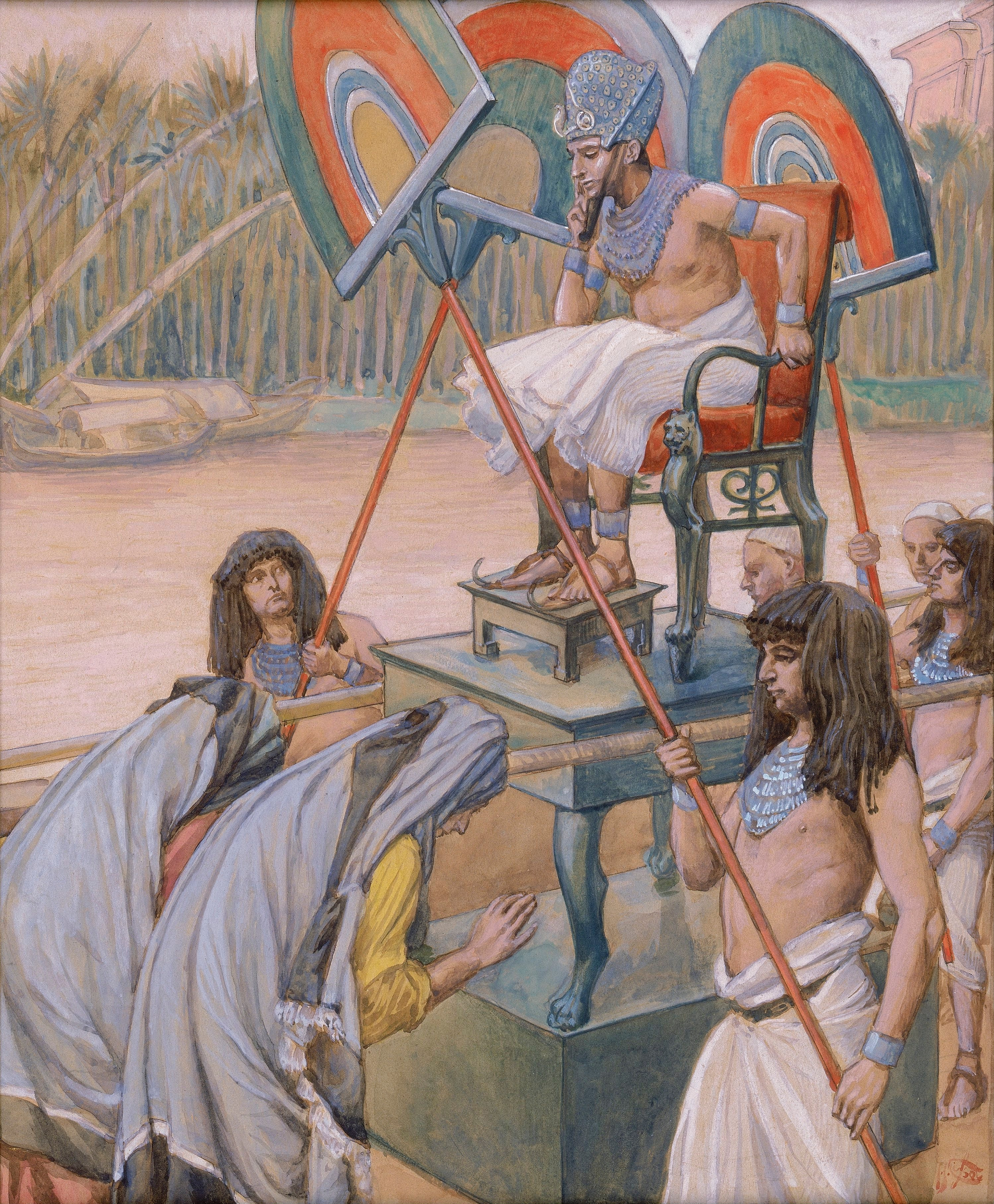
Pharaoh and the Midwives, James Tissot c. 1900. In Exodus 1:15–21, Puah and Shiphrah were commanded by Pharaoh to kill all of the newborn baby boys, but they disobeyed.

This "infanticidal" model makes several claims: that childrearing in tribal societies included child sacrifice or high infanticide rates, incest, body mutilation, child rape, and tortures, and that such activities were culturally acceptable. Psychohistorians do not claim that each child was killed, only that in some societies there was (or is) a selection process that would vary from culture to culture. For example, there is a large jump in the mortality rate of Papua New Guinean children after they reach the weaning stage. In the Solomon Islands some people reportedly kill their first-born child. In rural India, rural China, and other societies, some female babies have been exposed to death. DeMause's argument is that the surviving siblings of the sacrificed child may become disturbed.

Some states, both in the Old World and New World, practiced infanticide, including sacrifice in Mesoamerica and in Assyrian and Canaanite religions. Phoenicians, Carthaginians, and other members of early states sacrificed infants to their gods, as described in the table of the psychopathological effects of some forms of childrearing.

According to deMause, in the most primitive mode of childrearing of the above-mentioned table, mothers use their children to project parts of their dissociated self onto their children. The infanticidal clinging of the symbiotic mother prevents individuation so that innovation and more complex political organization are inhibited. On a second plane, deMause maintains that the attention paid by mothers of some contemporary societies to their children, such as sucking, fondling, and masturbating, is sexual according to an objective standard; and that this sexual attention is excessive.

The model is based on a reported lack of empathy by infanticidal parents, such as a lack of mutual gazes between parent and child, observed by Robert B. Edgerton, Maria Lepowsky, Bruce Knauft, John W. M. Whiting, and Margaret Mead, among others. Such mutual gazing is widely recognized in developmental psychology as crucial for proper bonding between mother and child.

== Criticism ==
Nineteenth-century British anthropology advanced a lineal, evolutionary sequence in a given culture from savagery to civilization. Cultures were seen on a hierarchical ladder. James George Frazer posited a universal progress from magical thinking to science. Most anthropologists of the late nineteenth century and early twentieth century studied primitive cultures outside Europe and North America. John Ferguson McLennan, Lewis Henry Morgan, and others argued that there was a parallel development in social institutions. In the 1950s, led by Leslie White, these evolutionist ideas gained influence in American anthropology.

The German-born Franz Boas managed to shift the paradigm. His approach, later named cultural relativism, resists universal values of any kind. According to Boas's principle, which represents the mainstream school in contemporary anthropology, a culture's beliefs and activities should be interpreted in the context of its own culture. This principle has been established as axiomatic in contemporary anthropology. The Vietnam War consolidated the Boasian shift in American anthropology.

Since the psychohistorians' model is analogous to the now discarded unilineal evolution theory, anthropologists have been critical of the negative value judgments, and the lineal progression, in the model currently advanced by psychohistorians as to what constitutes child abuse in primitive or non-Western cultures. Melvin Konner wrote:

Lloyd deMause, then editor of the History of Childhood Quarterly, claimed that all past societies treated children brutally, and that all historical change in their treatment has been a fairly steady improvement toward the kind and gentle standards we now set and more or less meet. [...] Now anthropologists — and many historians as well — were slack-jawed and nearly speechless. [...] Serious students of the anthropology of childhood beginning with Margaret Mead have called attention to the pervasive love and care lavished on children in many traditional cultures.

Psychohistorians accuse anthropologists and ethnologists of having avoided looking more closely at the evidence and having promulgated the myth of the noble savage. They maintain that what constitutes child abuse is a matter of a general psychological law, it leaves its permanent marks on the human brain structure, post-traumatic stress disorder is not a culture dependent phenomenon or a matter of opinion, and that some of the practices that mainstream anthropologists do not focus on, such as beatings of newborn infants, result in brain lesions and other visible neurological and psychological damage.

== See also ==
- Animism – Class of religious beliefs
- Child sacrifice in pre-Columbian cultures – Ritualistic killing of humans in pre-Columbian cultures
- Cultural relativism – Anthropological view
- Endemic warfare – Symbolic expressions of combat scenarios
- Moral absolutism – Metaethical position that some actions are intrinsically right or wrong
- Religious abuse – Abuse administered through religion
