= Psychohistory =

Academic discipline

Psychohistory is a transdisciplinary field of knowledge that represents an amalgam of psychology, history, psychoanalysis, political psychology, anthropology, ethnology, and related social sciences, art, and humanities. Psychohistorians examine the "why's" of history, utilizing the bottom-up approach rather than starting with psychological theories. They combine the insights of psychodynamic psychology, especially psychoanalysis, with the research methodology of the social sciences and humanities, to understand the emotional origin of the behavior of individuals, groups and nations, past and present. Psychohistorians are interested in examining one's childhood, personality, family dynamics, as well as dreams, overcoming adversity, creativity, group and political affiliations.

== Description ==
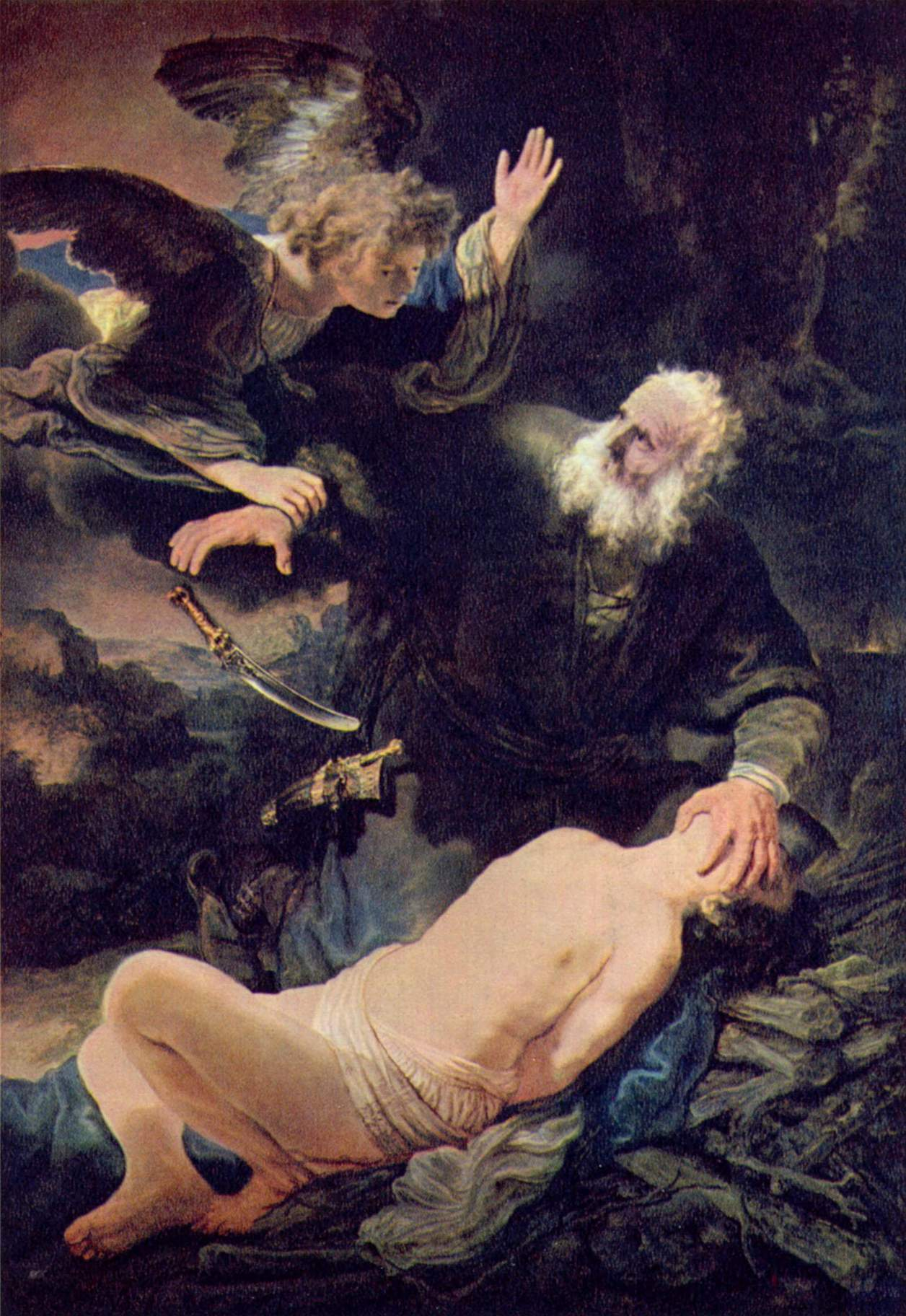
Rembrandt's painting of the sacrifice of Isaac (Gen.22). Psychohistory holds that ritual child sacrifice once occurred in most cultures.

Psychohistorians claim to derive many of its concepts from areas that are perceived to be ignored by conventional historians and anthropologists as shaping factors of human history, in particular, the effects of parenting practice and child abuse. According to conventional historians "the science of culture is independent of the laws of biology and psychology" and "the determining cause of a social fact should be sought among social facts preceding and not among the states of individual consciousness".

Psychohistorians, on the other hand, suggest that social behavior such as crime and war may be a self-destructive re-enactment of earlier abuse and neglect; that unconscious flashbacks to early fears and destructive parenting could dominate individual and social behavior.

Psychohistory relies heavily on historical biography. Notable examples of psychobiographies are those of Lewis Namier, who wrote about the British House of Commons, and Fawn Brodie, who wrote about Thomas Jefferson.

=== Areas of study ===
There are three inter-related areas of psychohistorical study.

1. The history of childhood – which looks at such questions as:

- How have children been raised throughout history
- How has the family been constituted
- How and why have practices changed over time
- The changing place and value of children in society over time
- How and why our views of child abuse and neglect have changed

2. Psychobiography – which seeks to understand individual historical people and their motivations in history.
3. Group psychohistory – which seeks to understand the motivations of large groups, including nations, in history and current affairs. In doing so, psychohistory advances the use of group-fantasy analysis of political speeches, political cartoons and media headlines since the loaded terms, metaphors and repetitive words therein offer clues to unconscious thinking and behaviors.

=== Independence as a discipline ===
Psychohistorians have argued that psychohistory is a separate field of scholarly inquiry with its own particular methods, objectives and theories, which set it apart from conventional historical analysis and anthropology. Some historians, social scientists and anthropologists have, however, argued that their disciplines already describe psychological motivation and that psychohistory is not, therefore, a separate subject. Others regard it as an undisciplined field of study, due to its emphasis given to speculation on the psychological motivations of people in history. Doubt has also been cast on the viability of the application of post-mortem psychoanalysis by Freud's followers.

Psychohistorians maintain that the difference is one of emphasis and that, in conventional study, narrative and description are central, while psychological motivation is hardly touched upon. Psychohistorians accuse most anthropologists and ethnologists of being apologists for incest, infanticide, cannibalism and child sacrifice. They maintain that what constitutes child abuse is a matter of objective fact, and that some of the practices which mainstream anthropologists apologize for (e.g., sacrificial rituals) may result in psychosis, dissociation and magical thinking.

== Psychogenic mode ==
Lloyd deMause has described a system of psychogenic modes (see below) which describe the range of styles of parenting he has observed historically and across cultures.

Psychohistorians have written much about changes in the human psyche through history; changes that they believe were produced by parents, and especially the mothers' increasing capacity to empathize with their children. Due to these changes in the course of history, different psychoclasses (or psychogenic modes) emerged. A psychoclass is a type of mentality that results from, and is associated with, a particular childrearing style, and in its turn influences the method of childrearing of the next generations. According to psychohistory theory, regardless of the changes in the environment, it is only when changes in childhood occur and new psychoclasses evolve that societies begin to progress.

The major psychogenic modes described by deMause are:

Mode	Childrearing characteristics	Historical manifestations
Infanticidal	Early infanticidal childrearing: Ritual sacrifice. High infanticide rates, incest, body mutilation, child rape and tortures.	Child sacrifice and infanticide among tribal societies, Mesoamerica and the Incas; in Assyrian and Canaanite religions. Phoenicians, Carthaginians and other early states also sacrificed infants to their gods. On the other hand, the relatively more enlightened Greeks and Romans exposed some of their babies ("late" infanticidal childrearing).
Infanticidal	Late infanticidal childrearing: While the young child is not overly rejected by the mother, many newborn babies, especially girls, are exposed to death.	Child sacrifice and infanticide among tribal societies, Mesoamerica and the Incas; in Assyrian and Canaanite religions. Phoenicians, Carthaginians and other early states also sacrificed infants to their gods. On the other hand, the relatively more enlightened Greeks and Romans exposed some of their babies ("late" infanticidal childrearing).
Abandoning	Early Christians considered a child as having a soul at birth, although possessed by evil tendencies. Routine infanticide was replaced by joining in the group fantasy of the sacrifice of Christ, who was sent by his father to be killed for the sins of others. Routine pederasty of boys continued in monasteries and elsewhere, and the rape of girls was commonplace.	Infanticide replaced by abandonment. Those children who survived the experience did not internalize a completely murderous superego. Longer swaddling, fosterage, outside wetnursing, oblation of children to monasteries and nunneries, and apprenticeship.
Ambivalent	The 12th century saw the first child instruction manuals and rudimentary child protection laws, although most mothers still emotionally rejected their children. Children were often treated as erotic objects by adults.	The later Middle Ages ended abandonment of children to monasteries. Early beating, shorter swaddling, mourning for deceased children, a precursor to empathy.
Intrusive	During the 16th century, particularly in England, parents shifted from trying to stop children's growth to trying to control them and make them obedient. Parents were prepared to give them attention as long as they controlled their minds, their insides, their anger and the lives they led.	The intrusive parent began to unswaddle the infant. Early toilet training, repression of child's sexuality. Hell threats turned into the Puritan child so familiar from early modern childrearing literature. On the other hand, the end of swaddling and wet-nursing made possible the explosive modern takeoff in scientific advance.
Socializing	Beginning in the 18th century, mothers began to enjoy child care, and fathers began to participate in younger children's development. The aim remained instilling parental goals rather than encouraging individuation. Manipulation and spanking were used to make children obedient. Hellfire and the harsher physical disciplinary actions using objects to beat the child disappeared. The Socializing Mode remains the most popular model of parenting in North America and Western Europe to the present day.	Use of guilt, "mental discipline", humiliation, time-out, rise of compulsory schooling, delegation of parental unconscious wishes. As parental injections continued to diminish, the rearing of the child became less a process of conquering its will than of training it. The socializing psychoclass built the modern world.
Helping	Beginning in the mid-20th century, some parents adopted the role of helping children reach their own goals in life, rather than "socialize" them into fulfilling parental wishes. Less manipulation, more unconditional love. Children raised in this way are far more empathic towards others in society than earlier generations.	Children's rights movement, natural childbirth, the abandonment of circumcision, attachment parenting, Taking Children Seriously, unconditional parenting, Parent Effectiveness Training, deschooling and free schooling.

Psychohistorians maintain that the five modes of abusive childrearing (excluding the "helping mode") are related to psychiatric disorders from psychoses to neuroses.

The chart below shows the dates at which these modes are believed to have evolved in the most advanced nations, based on contemporary accounts from historical records. A black-and-white version of the chart appears in Foundations of Psychohistory.

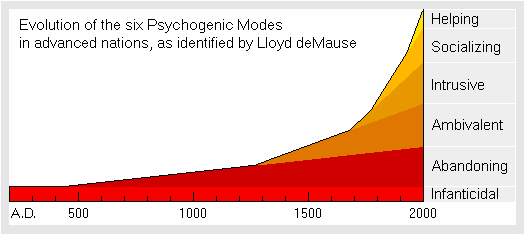

The y-axis on the above chart serves as an indicator of the new stage and not a measurement of the stage's size or relation to the x-axis.

The timeline does not apply to hunter-gatherer societies. It does not apply either to the Greek and Roman world, where there was a wide variation in childrearing practices. The arrival of the Ambivalent mode of child-rearing preceded the start of the Renaissance (mid 14th century) by only one or two generations, and the arrival of the Socializing mode coincided with the Age of Enlightenment, which began in the late 18th century.

Earlier forms of childrearing coexist with later modes, even in the most advanced countries. An example of this are reports of selective abortion (and sometimes exposure of baby girls) especially in China, Korea, Taiwan, Singapore, Malaysia, India, Pakistan, New Guinea, and many other developing countries in Asia and North Africa, regions in which millions of women are "missing". The conflict of new and old psychoclasses is also highlighted in psychohistorians' thought. This is reflected in political contrasts – for instance, in the clash between Blue State and Red State voters in the contemporary United States – and in civil wars.

Another key psychohistorical concept is that of group fantasy, which deMause regards as a mediating force between a psychoclass's collective childhood experiences (and the psychic conflicts emerging therefrom), and the psychoclass's behavior in politics, religion and other aspects of social life.

=== A psychoclass for postmodern times ===
According to the psychogenic theory, since Neanderthal man most tribes and families practiced infanticide, child mutilation, incest and beating of their children throughout prehistory and history. Presently the Western socializing mode of childrearing is considered much less abusive in the field, though this mode is not yet entirely free of abuse. In the opening paragraph of his seminal essay "The Evolution of Childhood" (first article in The History of Childhood), DeMause states:

The history of childhood is a nightmare from which we have only recently begun to awaken. The further back in history one goes, the lower the level of childcare, and the more likely children are to be killed, abandoned, beaten, terrorized and sexually abused.

There is notwithstanding an optimistic trait in the field. In a world of "helping mode" parents, deMause believes, violence of any other sort will disappear as well, along with magical thinking, mental disorders, wars and other inhumanities of man against man. Although, the criticism has been made that this itself is a form of magical thinking.

== Criticisms ==
There are no departments dedicated to psychohistory in any institution of higher learning, although some history departments have run courses in it. Psychohistory remains a controversial field of study, facing criticism in the academic community, with critics referring to it as a pseudoscience. Psychohistory uses a plurality of methodologies, and it is difficult to determine which is appropriate to use in each circumstance. Yet this "plurality" is quite circumscribed.

In 1973, historian Hugh A. Trevor-Roper dismissed the field of psychohistory entirely in response to the publication of Walter Langer's The Mind of Adolf Hitler. He contended that psychohistory's methodology rested "on a defective philosophy" and was "vitiated by a defective method." Instead of using historical evidence to derive historical interpretations, Trevor-Roper contended that "psycho-historians move in the opposite direction. They deduce their facts from their theories; and this means, in effect, that facts are at the mercy of theory, selected and valued according to their consistence with theory, even invented to support theory."

In his book Shrinking History: On Freud and the Failure of Psychohistory, historian David E. Stannard remarks that the quality of psychohistorical work ranges from "elegant and sensitive" to "tawdry and crackpot".

DeMause has received criticism on several levels. His formulations have been criticized for being insufficiently supported by credible research. He has also received criticism for being a strong proponent of the "black legend" view of childhood history (i.e. that the history of childhood was above all a history of progress, with children being far more often badly mistreated in the past). Similarly, his work has been called a history of child abuse, not childhood. The grim perspective of childhood history is known from other sources, e.g. Edward Shorter's The Making of the Modern Family and Lawrence Stone's The Family, Sex and Marriage in England 1500-1800. However, deMause received criticism for his repeated, detailed descriptions on childhood atrocities:

The reader is doubtless already familiar with examples of these psychohistorical "abuses." There is a significant difference, however, between the well-meaning and serious, if perhaps simplistic and reductionistic, attempt to understand the psychological in history and the psychohistorical expose that can at times verge on historical pornography. For examples of the more frivolous and distasteful sort of psychohistory, see Journal of Psychohistory. For more serious and scholarly attempts to understand the psychological dimension of the past, see The Psychohistory Review.

Recent psychohistory has also been criticized for being overly-entangled with DeMause, whose theories are not representative of the entire field.

== Organizations ==
Boston University offers a Psychohistory course at the undergraduate level and has published course details.

The Association for Psychohistory was founded by Lloyd deMause. It has 19 branches around the globe and has for over 30 years published the Journal of Psychohistory. The International Psychohistorical Association was also founded by deMause and others in 1977 as a professional organization for the field of psychohistory. It publishes Psychohistory News and has a psychohistorical mail order lending library. The association hosts an annual convention.

The Psychohistory Forum publishes the quarterly journal Clio's Psyche. It was founded in 1983 by historian and psychoanalyst Paul H. Elovitz. This organization of academics, therapists, and laypeople holds regular scholarly meetings in New York City and at international conventions. It also sponsors an online discussion group.

In Germany, scientists taking an interest in psychohistory have met annually since 1987. In 1992, the Gesellschaft für Psychohistorie und politische Psychologie e.V. (“Society for Psychohistory and Political Psychology”) was founded. This society issues the Jahrbuch für Psychohistorische Forschung (“Annual of Psychohistorical Research”)

== Notable psychohistorians ==
- Lloyd deMause, founder of The Institute for Psychohistory.
- Peter Gay, Sterling Professor at Yale University, author.
- Robert Jay Lifton, a psychiatrist specializing in psychological motivations for war and terrorism.
- Jerome Lee Shneidman, Editor of the Bulletin of the International Psychohistorical Association, established the Seminar in the History of Legal and Political Thought and Institutions at Columbia University.
- Vamik Volkan, psychiatrist, psychoanalyst, University of Virginia professor emeritus, peacemaker, and Nobel Prize nominee.
- Fawn Brodie, Professor at UCLA, and historian and biographer of Thomas Jefferson, Joseph Smith, and others.
- Joel Kovel, psychiatrist and psychoanalyst; co-founder of eco-socialism.
- Alice Miller (psychologist), psychoanalyst and philosopher, noted for her books on parental child abuse.

== See also ==
- Bicameral mentality – Hypothesis in psychology
- Child murder – Homicide of a minor
- Helicopter parent – Parent who closely manages their child's life
- Historicism – Approach to explaining social and cultural phenomena by studying their history
- Non-aggression principle – Core concept in libertarianism
- Poisonous pedagogy – Human Behavior
- Psychohistorical views on infanticide – Term used in the study of psychohistory
- Religious abuse – Abuse administered through religion
- Trauma model of mental disorders – Theory in psychopathology
