= Jerome Lee Shneidman =

American historian (1929–2008)

- Born: June 20, 1929; New York City, U.S.
- Died: July 29, 2008 (aged 79)
- Education: Stuyvesant High School; New York University (BA, MA); University of Wisconsin–Madison (PhD)
- Occupation: Historian
- Spouse: Conalee
- Parent(s): Bernard Shneidman; Fanya Raskin

Jerome Lee Shneidman (June 20, 1929 – July 29, 2008) was an American historian of medieval and early American history. His academic contributions were predominantly in the fields of medieval history, psychohistory, and early American history.

== Early life ==
Shneidman was born as the eldest of two sons on June 20, 1929 in New York City to a family of Jewish immigrants from the Russian Empire. He grew up in the Bronx, but moved when he was 13 to the Upper West Side, where he would live for the rest of his life. His father Bernard was a dedicated Marxist and his mother, Fanya Raskin, supported their family with a modest laundry business. Shneidman later said that his youth was comfortable enough; authors of his obituary quoted him as saying, "[there] was always enough money for books, magazines, and the right [i.e. left wing] causes", but often not enough money for clothes or doctors.

Shneidman was diagnosed with melanoma when he was about six months old. A major skin graft rearranged elements of his body and he spent a lot of time in hospital over the next 13 years. Shneidman was physically altered by his numerous surgeries. On two separate occasions his parents were told he would not survive the night, and upon his recovery he was banned from many youth activities and all sports. During his time in hospital wards, Shneidman read a great deal, especially about history, to keep his mind active and mentally escape his environment.

== Education ==
Shneidman became very interested in history as a young child. Alongside his home education in radical ideas and self-education while in hospital, Shneidman was educated in the New York public schools, graduating from Stuyvesant High School before attending the Heights Campus of New York University, graduating with a BA in 1951 and MA in 1952, before switching to the University of Wisconsin–Madison, completing his PhD in 1957. Shneidman did post-doctoral study as a research candidate at Columbia University Psychoanalytic Clinic for training and then at the Rubin Fine Psychoanalytic Institute, where the instructors encouraged him to deal with living patients. He eventually dropped out because he "only wanted to analyze dead people", as he put it.

== Academic career ==
Shneidman was a professor at Adelphi University for 45 years. He also taught at Brooklyn College, the College of New York, Fairleigh Dickinson University, and the University of Maryland at Frankfurt A/M in Germany and Libya. In 2001 he became an emeritus professor at Adelphi, subsequently continuing to teach historical methodology.

Shneidman published over 100 articles, book chapters, and book reviews on a variety of topics, including: Aaron Burr, Alexander Hamilton, Karl Marx's alienation, Catherine De Medici, Ivan the Terrible, his own motivation and patterns as a historian, historical philately, Jewish history, and psychohistorical methodology.

He was a member of around 20 professional organizations, including the Board of Collaborators of the Indice Historico Español of the University of Barcelona (from 1965) and the Aaron Burr Association.

== Personal politics ==
The young Shneidman was attracted to the ideals of communism, but found the reality of the Soviet Union too detached from those revolutionary ideals. After the 1939 Molotov–Ribbentrop Pact, Shneidman lost faith in Stalin and Soviet communism, while his father remained an ideological follower of Stalin's agenda. Shneidman subsequently became involved in liberal reform movements in the metropolitan area.

Shneidman served as a New York County Committeeman starting in 1970, under the auspices of Tammany Hall. His political advocacy was in English and Yiddish.

In 1973 and 1975 he served as a Scholar-Diplomat for the U.S. State Department. In 1965 he established the Seminar in the History of Legal and Political Thought and Institutions at Columbia University, serving as chair from 1985 to 2002.

== Work on psychohistory ==
Shneidman was a psychohistorian, meaning he sought historical perspectives by applying psychoanalysis to historical figures and events. Much of his work dealt with psychobiography and the methodology of psychohistorians.

In 1986 Shneidman began editing the Bulletin of the International Psychohistorical Association. He joined the Psychohistory Forum in the mid-1980s. When in 1991 the forum created a research group, "Communism: The Dream That Failed", Shneidman was appointed group leader due to his particular knowledge in the field.

His psychohistory honors include being an "Invited Participant" of the American Psychoanalytic Association's Interdisciplinary Colloquium on "Problems of the Psychoanalytic Theory of Aggression" from 1979 to 1996.

== Death ==
Shneidman died on July 29, 2008, seven months after the death of his wife Conalee, to whom he had been married for 45 years.

== Books ==
- The Rise of the Aragonese-Catalan Empire: 1200-1350 (2 volumes, 1970, translated into Catalan)
- Spain & Franco: Quest for International Acceptance, 1949-1959 (1973)
- John F. Kennedy (1974, with Peter Schwab)
- Leading from Weakness: Jefferson’s Overt and Covert Relations with Spain and the Barbary States: 1801-1807 (manuscript not yet published).

== Selected articles ==
- Great Lives from History: American Series, 5 vols., (Pasadena: Salem Press, Inc., 1987), 1: 360–365).
- “Marx’s Road to ‘On the Jewish Question.’” Clio’s Psyche, Vol. 4, No. 4 (March 1998): 117-122.
- “On the Nature of Psychohistorical Evidence,” The Journal of Psychohistory, 16 (New York, 1988): 205–212.
- “On the Teaching of Psychohistory to Adelphi University Undergraduates,” The Journal of Psychohistory, 15 (New York, 1988): 456–459.
