= Human sacrifice in pre-Columbian cultures =

Ritualistic killing of humans in pre-Columbian cultures

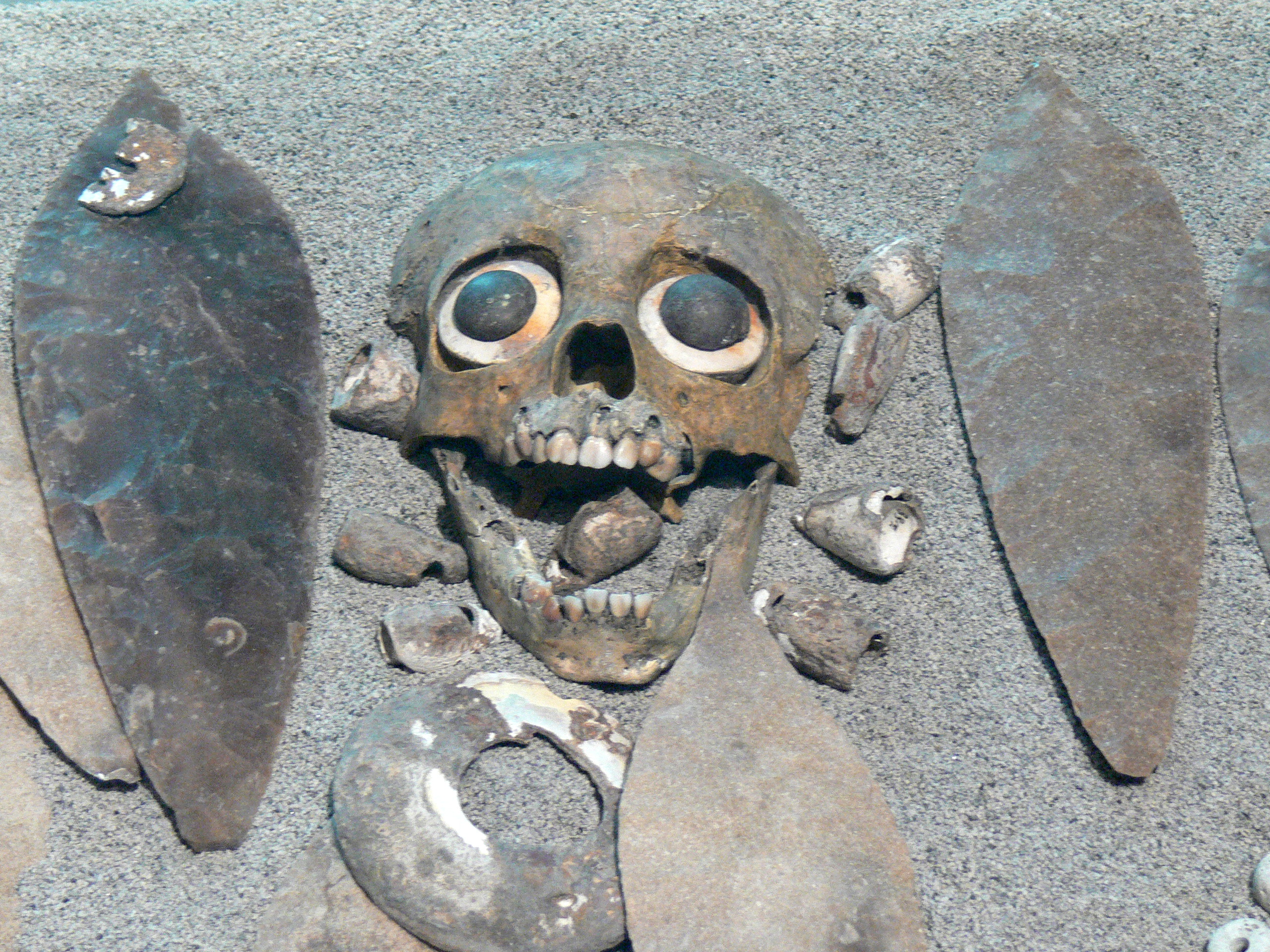
Aztec burial of a sacrificed child at Tlatelolco.

The practice of human sacrifice in pre-Columbian cultures—particularly those in Mesoamerica and South America—is well documented both in the archaeological records and in written sources. The exact ideologies behind child sacrifice in different pre-Columbian cultures are unknown but it is often thought to have been performed to placate certain deities.

== Mesoamerica ==
=== Olmec culture ===
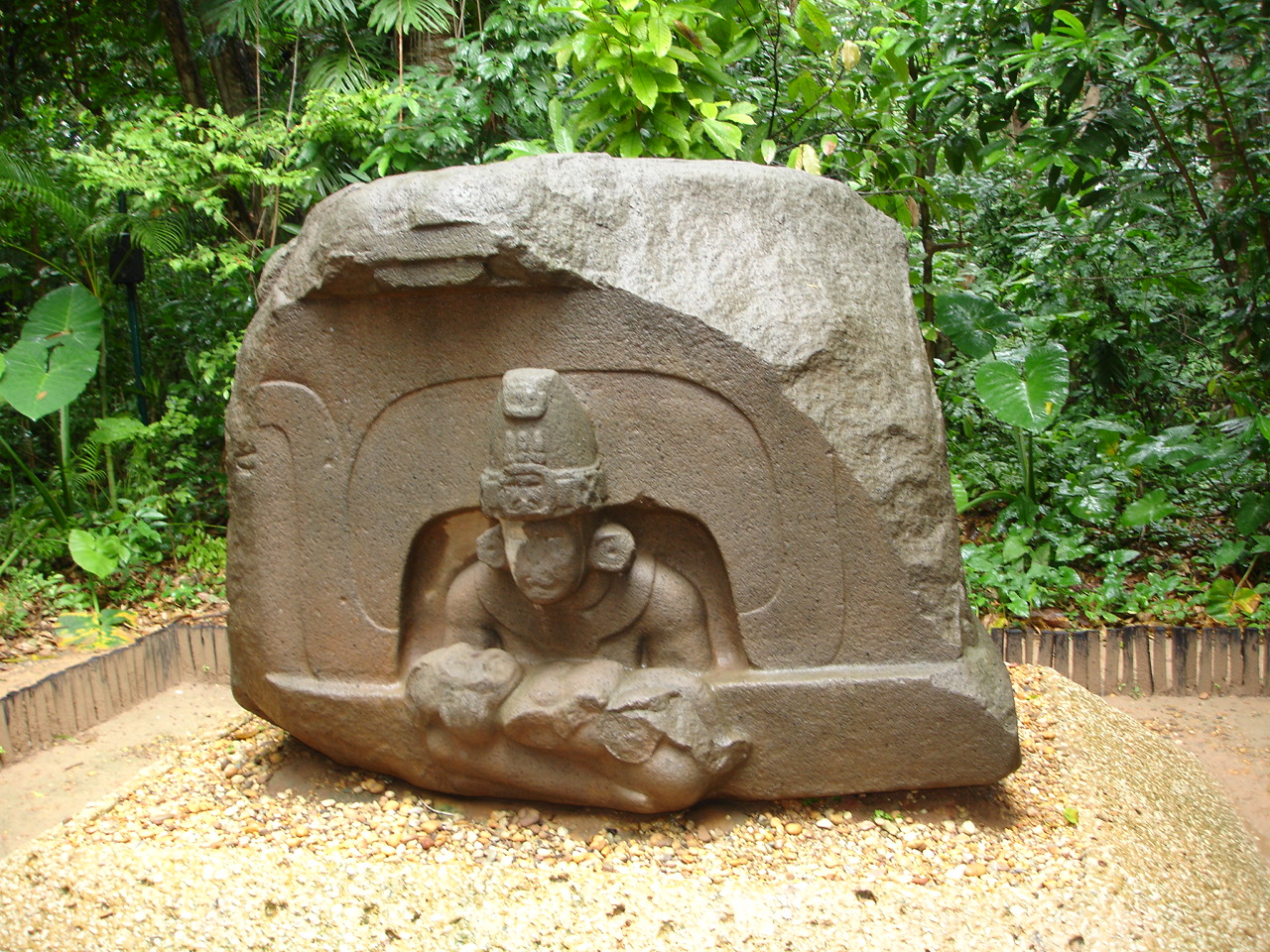
Altar 5 from La Venta. The inert were-jaguar baby held by the central figure is seen by some as an indication of child sacrifice.

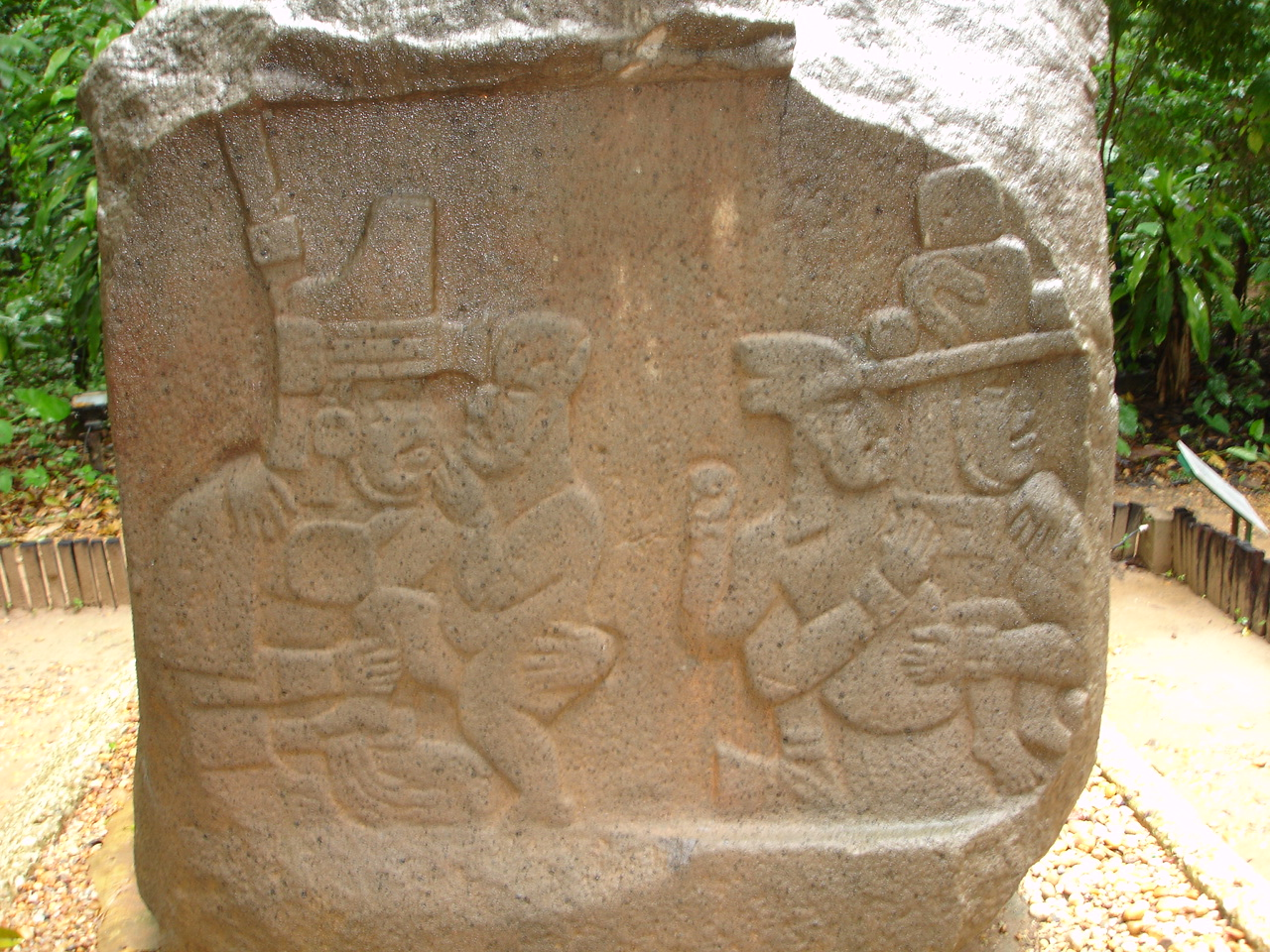
In contrast, its sides show bas-reliefs of humans holding quite lively were-jaguar babies.

Although there is no incontrovertible evidence of child sacrifice in the Olmec civilization, full skeletons of newborn or unborn infants, as well as dismembered femurs and skulls, have been found at the El Manatí sacrificial bog. These bones are associated with sacrificial offerings, particularly wooden busts. It is not known yet how the infants met their deaths.

Some researchers have also associated infant sacrifice with Olmec ritual art showing limp "were-jaguar" babies, most famously in La Venta's Altar 5 (to the right) or Las Limas figure. Definitive answers await further findings.

=== Maya culture ===
In 2005, a mass grave of one- to two-year-old sacrificed children was found in the Maya region of Comalcalco. The sacrifices were apparently performed for consecration purposes when building temples at the Comalcalco acropolis.

There are also skulls suggestive of child sacrifice dating to the Maya periods. Mayanists believe that, like the Aztecs, the Maya performed child sacrifice in specific circumstances. For example, infant sacrifice would occur to satisfy supernatural beings who would have eaten the souls of more powerful people. In the Classic period some Maya art that depict the extraction of children's hearts during the ascension to the throne of the new kings, or at the beginnings of the Maya calendar have been studied. In one of these cases, Stela 11 in Piedras Negras, Guatemala, a sacrificed boy can be seen. Other scenes of sacrificed boys are visible on painted jars.

=== Teotihuacan culture ===
There is evidence of child sacrifice in Teotihuacan culture. As early as 1906, Leopoldo Batres uncovered burials of children at the four corners of the Pyramid of the Sun. Archaeologists have found newborn skeletons associated with altars, leading some to suspect "deliberate death by infant sacrifice".

=== Toltec culture ===
In 2007, archaeologists announced that they had analyzed the remains of 24 children, aged 5 to 15, found buried together with a figurine of Tlaloc. The children, found near the ancient ruins of the Toltec capital of Tula, had been decapitated. The remains have been dated to AD 950 to 1150.

"To try and explain why there are 24 bodies grouped in the same place, well, the only way is to think that there was a human sacrifice", archaeologist Luis Gamboa said.

=== Aztec culture ===
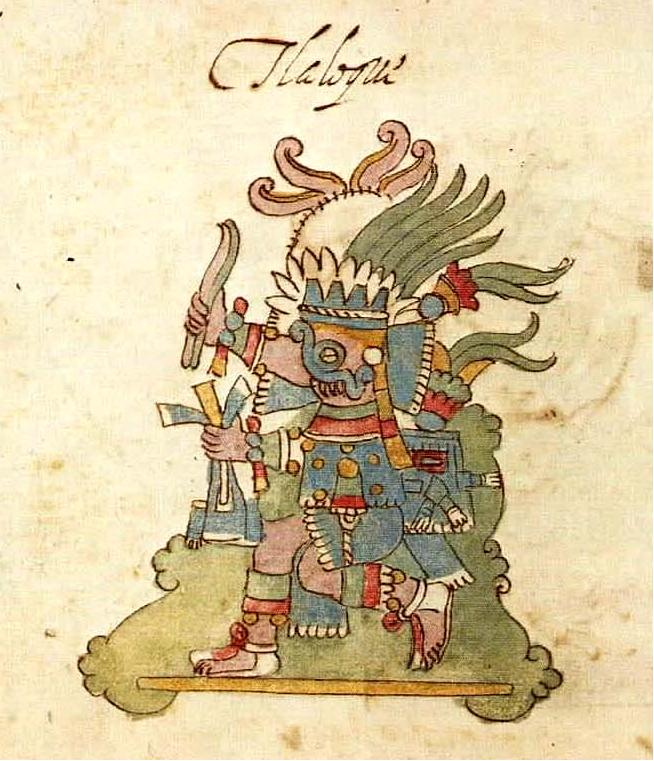
Tláloc, as shown in the late 16th century Codex Rios.

The Aztec religion is one of the most widely documented pre-Hispanic cultures. Diego Durán in the Book of the Gods and Rites wrote about the religious practices devoted to the water gods, Tlaloc and Chalchiuhtlicue, and a very important part of their annual ritual included the sacrifice of infants and young children.

According to Bernardino de Sahagún, the Aztecs believed that, if sacrifices were not given to Tlaloc, the rain would not come, and their crops would not grow. Archaeologists have found the remains of 42 children sacrificed to Tlaloc (and a few to Ehecátl Quetzalcóatl) in the offerings of the Great Pyramid of Tenochtitlan. In every case, the 42 children, mostly males aged around six, were suffering from serious cavities, abscesses or bone infections that would have been painful enough to make them cry continually. Tlaloc required the tears of the young so their tears would wet the earth.

Fernando de Alva Cortés Ixtlilxochitl, an Aztec descendant and the author of the Codex Ixtlilxochitl, claimed that one in five children of the Mexica subjects was killed annually. These high figures have not been confirmed by historians. Hernán Cortés describes such an event in his Letters: "And they would take their children to kill and sacrifice to their Idols."

In Xochimilco, the remains of a three-to-four-year-old boy were found. The skull was broken, and the bones had an orange/yellowish cast, a vitreous texture, and porous and compacted tissue. Aztecs have been known to boil down remains of some sacrificed victims to remove the flesh and place the skull in the tzompantli. Archaeologists concluded that the skull was boiled and that it cracked due to the ebullition of the brain mass. Photographs of the skull have been published in specialized journals.

In History of the Things of New Spain Sahagún confesses he was aghast by the fact that, during the first month of the year, the child sacrifices were approved by their own parents, who also ate their children.

In the month Atlacacauallo of the Aztec calendar (from February 2 to February 21 of the Gregorian Calendar), children and captives were sacrificed to the water deities, Tláloc, Chalchitlicue, and Ehécatl.

In the month Tozoztontli (from March 14 to April 2), children were sacrificed to Coatlicue, Tlaloc, Chalchitlicue, Tona.

In the month Hueytozoztli (from April 3 to April 22), a maid, a boy and a girl were sacrificed to Cintéotl, Chicomecacóatl, Tlaloc and Quetzalcoatl.

In the month Tepeilhuitl (from September 30 to October 19), children and two noble women were sacrificed by extraction of the heart and flaying; ritual cannibalism in honor of Tláloc-Napatecuhtli, Matlalcueye, Xochitécatl, Mayáhuel, Milnáhuatl, Napatecuhtli, Chicomecóatl, Xochiquétzal.

In the month Atemoztli (from November 29 to December 18), children and slaves were sacrificed by decapitation in honor of the Tlaloques.

== South America ==
Archaeologists have uncovered physical evidence of child sacrifice at several pre-Columbian cultures in South America. In an early example, the Moche of Northern Peru sacrificed teenagers en masse, as archaeologist Steve Bourget found when he uncovered the bones of 42 male adolescents in 1995.

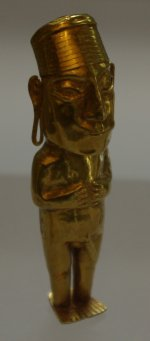
Male figurine for Capa Cocha rituals, Inca, 1450–1540 CE, gold, Dumbarton Oaks Museum, Washington, DC.

=== Chimú culture ===
The Chimú, who occupied northern Peru before the Incas, and who were ultimately conquered by the Incas a few decades before the Spanish arrival, carried out what has been claimed as the largest single example of mass child sacrifice at Huanchaco, where their chief city of Chan Chan was located. Researchers have identified at least 227 individuals as sacrificial victims, and it is believed that this mass sacrifice may have been carried out to appease deities who were supposedly bringing extreme rainfall weather conditions upon the Chimú.

=== Moche culture ===
Human sacrifice pervades Moche culture through the use of funerary rituals providing guardians to high status individuals and the ritualistic battles that utilized defeated Moche warriors as sacrificial victims to a bloodletting ceremony.

=== Inca culture ===
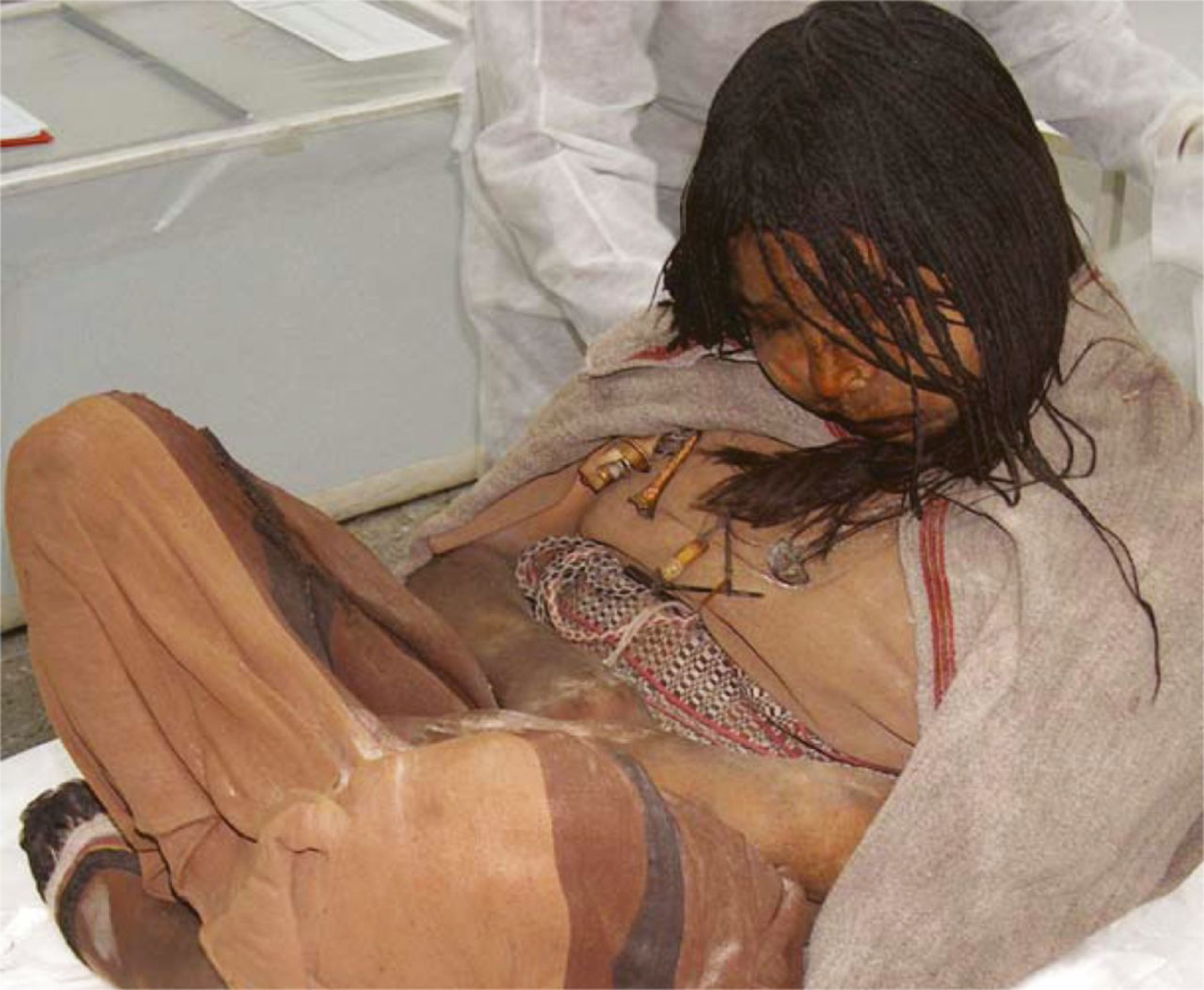
The maiden. Llullaillaco mummies in Salta province (Argentina).

Qhapaq hucha was the Inca practice of human sacrifice, mainly using children. The Incas performed child sacrifices during or after important events, such as the death of the Sapa Inca (emperor) or during a famine. Children were selected as sacrificial victims as they were considered to be the purest of beings. These children were also physically perfect and healthy, because they were the best the people could present to their gods. The victims may be as young as 6 and as old as 15.

Months or even years before the sacrifice pilgrimage, the children were fattened up. Their diets were those of the elite, consisting of maize and animal proteins. They were dressed in fine clothing and jewelry and escorted to Cusco to meet the emperor where a feast was held in their honor. More than 100 precious ornaments were found to be buried with these children in the burial site.

The Incan high priests took the children to high mountaintops for sacrifice. As the journey was extremely long and arduous, especially so for the younger, coca leaves were fed to them to aid them in their breathing so as to allow them to reach the burial site alive. Upon reaching the burial site, the children were given an intoxicating drink to minimize pain, fear, and resistance. They were then killed either by strangulation, a blow to the head, or by leaving them to lose consciousness in the extreme cold and die of exposure.

Early colonial Spanish missionaries wrote about this practice but only recently have archaeologists such as Johan Reinhard begun to find the bodies of these victims on Andean mountaintops, naturally mummified owing to the freezing temperatures and dry windy mountain air.

==== Inca mummies ====
In 1995, the body of an almost entirely frozen young Inca girl (age 15), later named Mummy Juanita, was discovered on Mount Ampato. Two more ice-preserved mummies, one girl (age 6) and one boy (age 8), were discovered nearby a short while later. All showed signs of alcohol and coca leaves in their system, making them fall asleep, only to be frozen to death. The boy was the only one who showed signs of resistance, due to his hands and feet being tied up. It is also speculated that he might have died from suffocation, as vomit and blood were found on his clothing.

In 1999, near Llullaillaco's 6,739 m (22,110 ft) summit, an Argentine-Peruvian expedition found the perfectly preserved bodies of three Inca children, sacrificed approximately 500 years earlier, including a 15-year-old girl, nicknamed "La doncella" (the maiden), a seven-year-old boy, and a six-year-old girl, nicknamed "La niña del rayo" (the lightning girl). The latter's nickname reflects the fact that sometime during the 500 years on the summit, the preserved body was struck by lightning, partially burning it and some of the ceremonial artifacts. The three mummies are exhibited in rotating fashion at the Museum of High Altitude Archaeology, specially built for them in Salta, Argentina.

Scientific investigation suggests some child victims were drugged with ethanol and coca leaves during the time before their deaths.

=== Timoto-Cuicas culture ===
The Timoto–Cuica people worshiped idols of stone and clay, built temples, and offered human sacrifices. Until colonial times, children were sacrificed secretly in Laguna de Urao, Mérida. This was chronicled by Juan de Castellanos, who described the feasts and human sacrifices that were done in honour of Icaque, an Andean prehispanic goddess.

== North America ==
Mound 72 at the Mississippian culture site of Cahokia, directly across the Mississippi River from modern St. Louis, Missouri, contained the remains of "scores of clearly sacrificed female retainers" as well as four headless male skeletons. The roughly contemporaneous site of Dickson Mounds, some 100 miles (150 km) to the north, also contained a mass grave with four headless male skeletons. The presence of the four bodies, whose heads were replaced with pots at burial, is not conclusive of ritualized sacrifice.

A single Pawnee village practiced an annual Morning Star ceremony, which included the sacrifice of a young girl. Though the ritual continued, the sacrifice was discontinued in the 19th century.

== See also ==
- Cannibalism in the Americas
- Child murder
- Early infanticidal childrearing
- Human sacrifice
  - Child sacrifice
  - Human sacrifice in Aztec culture
  - Human sacrifice in Maya culture
- Infanticide
- List of Andean peaks with known pre-Columbian ascents
- Religious abuse
