= Social abuse =

Abuse that tries to cut off the victim from their social network

Social abuse is a form of abuse that cuts off or tries to cut off the victim from their social network, including their community, friends, or family. It also includes attempts to harm a victim's relationships or reputation, through acts such as humiliating the victim in public, spreading rumors, and otherwise manipulating the victim's image. Social abuse often results in some form of isolation, which removes the victim from any sense of social belongingness outside of relationships the abuser approves of. It can be a kind of psychological abuse, emotional abuse or spiritual abuse. It may also involve attempts to monopolise the victim's skills and resources.

== See also ==
- Religious abuse
- Isolation to facilitate abuse
- Psychological abuse
- Relational aggression
- Dating violence
- Intimate partner violence
