= Estrangement =

Estrangement or Estranged may refer to:

== Arts and entertainment ==
- Estrangement (album), released in August 2007 by the Ukrainian black metal band Drudkh
- Estrangement, an album by the German Gothic metal band Dreadful Shadows released in 1994
- "Estranged" (song), a power ballad and music video by the American hard rock band Guns N' Roses
- Estranged (band), a Malaysian alternative rock band
- Estranged (film), a 2006 20-minute short film directed by D. J. Matrundola
- Estrangement effect, a performing arts concept coined by playwright Bertolt Brecht

== Human relationships ==
- Family estrangement, the loss of a relationship between two or more family members
- Sibling estrangement, the loss of a relationship between siblings

== Other uses ==
- Self-estrangement, a sociological concept, a feeling of alienation from others and society as a whole
- Social alienation, the loss of an individual's connection with society
