= Woodhull Institute =

The Woodhull Institute
- Formation: September 1997; 28 years ago
- Type: Leadership training for women
- Website: Official website

The Woodhull Institute is a training organization in the United States, co-founded by Naomi Wolf and Robin Stern, for the purpose of ethical leadership training and professional development for women.

== History ==
The Woodhull Institute was founded in September 1997.
