= Christina Krüsi =

Swiss writer and artist

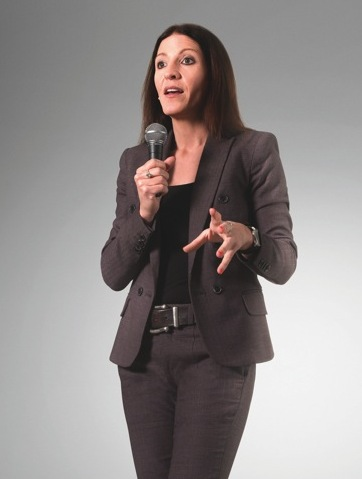
- Krüsi - speaking engagement
- Born: 1968; Switzerland
- Occupations: Author, Artist
- Spouse: Roland Weber (2nd marriage)
- Children: 2
- Website: www.christina-kruesi.com & (Artist website: www.ckruesi.ch)

Christina Krüsi (born 1968) is a Swiss author, artist, consultant on mediation and conflict resolution, and advocate for preventing child abuse. She was a missionary kid who was sexually abused for five years as a child while her parents worked in Bolivia, translating the Bible into local languages. She told her story in a 2013 memoir called "Das Paradies war meine Hölle" ("Paradise Was My Hell"), and a documentary of her experiences was created by Swiss public television and was broadcast in 2014. She lives and works in Switzerland.

== Life ==
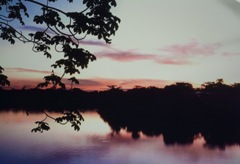
Sunset Tumi Chucua (taken by Krüsi 2013)

Christina Krüsi's parents were linguists who travelled to Bolivia in 1966 with the Swiss division of Wycliffe Global Alliance to translate the Bible into the language of the Chiquitano people, as well as others. The Wycliffe group worked in conjunction with SIL International which ran the site in Tumi Chucua, in the northeast corner of Bolivia. Her parents travelled back to Switzerland in 1968 so that Krüsi would be born there, and returned to Bolivia shortly thereafter.

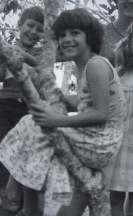
Krüsi 1978 Tumi Chucua, Bolivia

From 1974, when Krüsi was six years old, until the family left Bolivia in 1979, she was raped repeatedly by five members of the missionary group. 16 other children, girls and boys, were also regularly raped by a wider circle of men. The rapists coerced the children to keep the abuse quiet by threatening that the mission would close and the indigenous people they were to help would go to hell if they told anyone. Krüsi's parents were not aware of the abuse, despite changes in her behavior and a suicide attempt.

Krüsi returned to Switzerland with her family in 1979 at 11 years old. Krüsi finished middle school and then attended art school before getting training to be a teacher. In 1987 when she was 19 years old, she married a man who was also from the Christian community. Together they had two children.

She told no one about the abuse until 2002, after she collapsed while jogging, and decided that she had to confront the past and stop being a victim. Her story was met with disbelief and dismay by those around her, including her family. However the next year, she received a letter from the US division of Wycliffe, which said that two other people who had been abused had come forward and had said that she too had been abused. The next year Wycliffe held a meeting in the US to discuss what had happened, which Krüsi attended, and the full extent of the abuse emerged. A formal report was generated by SIL International and authorities were informed, but because the statute of limitations had long expired, no legal action could be taken. Additionally, three of the five perpetrators were dead by that time. SIL and Wycliffe issued written apologies to Krüsi and the other people who had been abused, and provided them with some money. Wycliffe also implemented numerous policy changes to protect children and SIL, together with New Tribes Mission, formed the Child Protection and Safety Network in 2006.

Krüsi remained determined to overcome the wounds of her past, and the turmoil led to the end of her marriage. With the money from the settlement, she was able to support herself and her children while she completed two master's degree programs and returned to making art. She began using her sculptures and paintings to continue her work of recovery. She also took a job as a school principal. She eventually realized that she needed to put the story into words to help with her own recovery, for the sake of the other people who had been abused in Bolivia, whom she had come to know, and most of whom were shattered and on government assistance, and to prevent future abuse. When the book was ready to be published, she quit her job running the school in anticipation of the toll it would take on her and those around her.

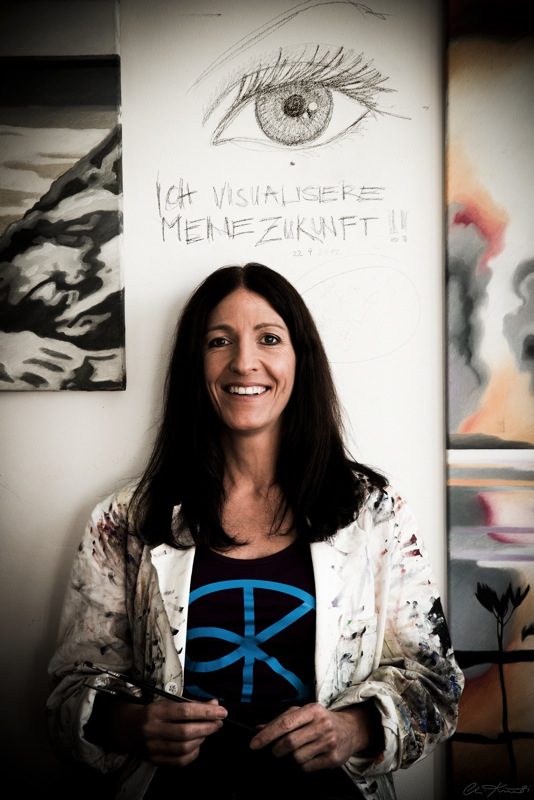
Krüsi in Art Studio

In 2013, Krüsi published her memoir, "Das Paradies war meine Hölle" ("Paradise Was My Hell"). In response to the book, in March 2013 Krüsi's parents wrote a letter in Wycliffe's journal expressing horror over what happened to their daughter and how they almost lost their faith in God due to the events, and also expressed their subsequent affirmation of their faith and their continued dedication to their translation work.

In April 2014, Swiss Television produced a program on Krüsi's experiences as part of a regular documentary series called DOK) titled " Ich bin kein Opfer mehr – missbraucht im Namen Gottes" ("I am no longer a victim - Abused in the name of God.")

In addition to the book and movie, Krüsi co-founded the Christina Krüsi Foundation for the protection of children; it receives a portion of Krüsi's book and art sales.

She has married again, and continues to paint and sculpt, and has also self-published a children's book called, "Chrigi und Nanama: Dschungelfreunde". She has a business providing mediation and conflict management services, and is writing a second book on the processing of trauma.

== See also ==
- Godly Response to Abuse in the Christian Environment
