= Cynthia A. Stark =

American scholar

Cynthia A. Stark is a professor in the Department of Philosophy at the University of Utah, who has written on the effects of gaslighting and argues that pornography is a distinct act of harm.

== Selected publications ==
- Stark, Cynthia A. (1997). "Is Pornography an Action?: The Causal vs. the Conceptual View of Pornography's Harm". Social Theory and Practice. 23 (2): 277–306. doi:10.5840/soctheorpract199723213. ISSN 0037-802X. JSTOR 23559185. S2CID 147461092.
- Stark, Cynthia A. (1 February 2009). "Contractarianism and cooperation". Politics, Philosophy & Economics. 8 (1): 73–99. doi:10.1177/1470594X08098872. ISSN 1470-594X. S2CID 143477609.
- Stark, Cynthia A. (1 April 2019). "Gaslighting, Misogyny, and Psychological Oppression". The Monist. 102 (2): 221–235. doi:10.1093/monist/onz007.
