= GRACE (organization) =

Christian organization focused on abuse prevention

Godly Response to Abuse in the Christian Environment
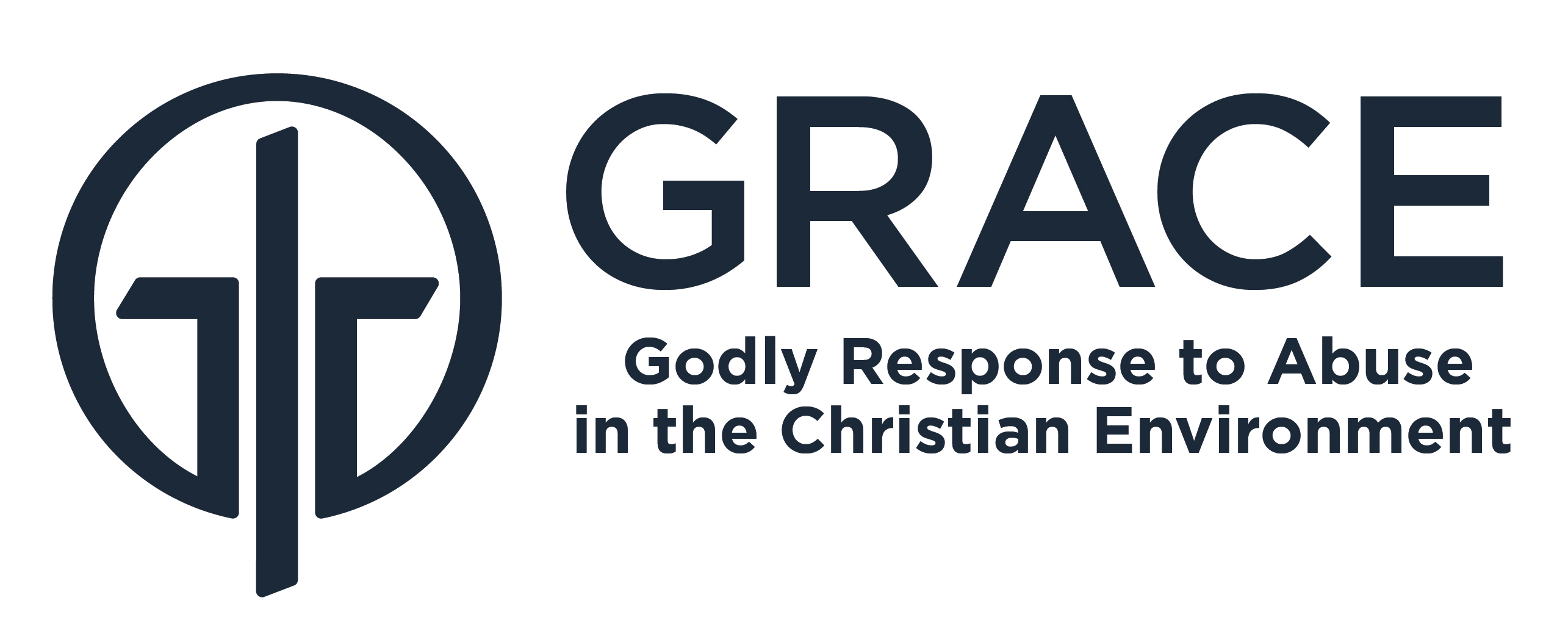
- Abbreviation: GRACE
- Formation: 2004, recognized as nonprofit in 2006
- Founder: Basyle "Boz" Tchividjian
- Type: Non-profit Organization
- Purpose: Abuse prevention
- Location: Lynchburg, Virginia, United States
- Key people: Laura Thien (Executive Director)
- Website: netgrace.org

Godly Response to Abuse in the Christian Environment (GRACE) is a Virginia 501(c)(3) non-profit organization to help Christian groups, regardless of denomination, to respond appropriately to sexual abuse, psychological abuse and physical abuse. Its headquarters are at Lynchburg, Virginia, United States.

== History ==
GRACE was founded in 2003 after a reporter called Boz Tchividjian, a grandson of Billy Graham who, at the time, was working as a Florida sex-crimes prosecutor, about a case of sexual abuse mishandled by a pastor. Tchividjian became convinced that Evangelical institutions were not properly addressing incidents of sexual abuse, incidents that he believed would eventually lead to scandals similar to the ones in the Catholic Church. In Tchividjian's view, the authoritarian culture of some Protestant organizations was particularly susceptible to what he called "spiritual abuse"—the attempt of religious leaders to silence victims or convince them that they deserved their abuse. Tchividjian has stated that "When it comes to child sexual abuse, too many churches and Christian organizations prefer to sacrifice individuals in order to protect themselves. We end up living out the very antithesis of the Gospel that we preach. The consequences are devastating."

Tchividjian first contacted Victor Vieth, who previously headed the Gundersen National Child Protection Training Center, and Diane Langberg, a psychologist from Pennsylvania who specialized in trauma; these three invited a number of legal, therapeutic and clerical professionals to form a board that created GRACE, an organization dedicated to educating churches and parachurch organizations about preventing, detecting, and dealing with sexual abuse.

The organization was officially founded in 2004 by Tchividjian to help churches to fight against sexual abuse in Christian organizations. It is currently headed by Laura Thien, a South Carolina clinical social worker.

== Programs ==
GRACE offers sexual, psychological, and physical abuse-prevention (safeguarding) programs; independent investigations of allegations of abuse; and organizational-culture assessments of abuse prevention.

== See also ==
- Christina Krüsi
- Missionary kid
