= Paul Pruyser =

Dutch-American clinical psychologist

Paul Willem Pruyser (1916–1987) was a Dutch-American clinical psychologist at the Menninger Clinic, influenced by James, Freud, Otto, and Winnicott, one of the most famous contributors to the psychological theories of religion. He created the Psychology and Culture model, which discusses the three "Worlds" in which people live — The Autistic, The Illusionistic, and The Realistic. In his book The Minister as Diagnostician (1976), Pruyser affirmed the theological expertise and clinical authority of hospital chaplains on interdisciplinary healthcare teams.

Pruyser was born 28 May 1916 in Amsterdam. In April 1946 he married Jansje Martha Fontijn. After finishing his Master's degree at the University of Amsterdam and three months after the birth of their first child, Pruyser and his family emigrated to the United States in May 1948 to live in Newton Center, Massachusetts. He received his Doctorate at Boston University in 1953, after which he moved to Topeka, Kansas to work at the Topeka State Hospital. Pruyser became an American citizen in 1954. He died in Topeka, Kansas, on April 9, 1987.

== Bibliography ==
- Andrew Reid Fuller. Psychology and Religion: Eight Points of View. Littlefield Adams Quality Paperbacks, third ed., 1994 ISBN 0-8226-3036-2
- W. Edward Craighead, Charles B. Nemeroff. The Corsini Encyclopedia of Psychology and Behavioral Science. Wiley, 3 edition, 2002 ISBN 0-471-27083-0
- Paul W. Pruyser. The Minister as Diagnostician: Personal Problems in Pastoral Perspective. Philadelphia: Westminster Press, 1976. ISBN 0-664-24123-9
