= Lloyd deMause =

American thinker (1931–2020)

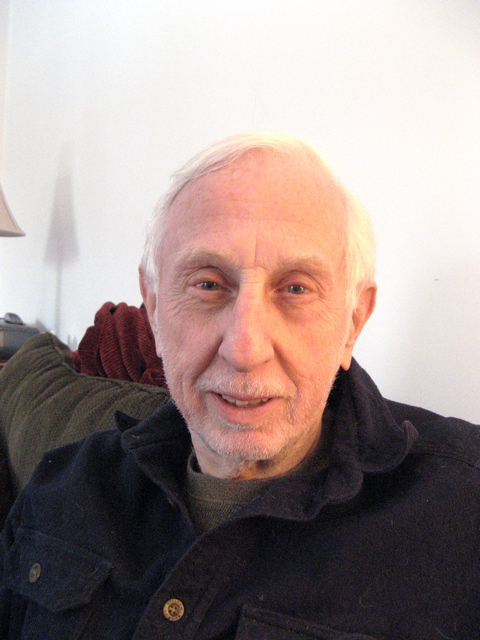
- Born: September 19, 1931; Detroit, Michigan, U.S.
- Died: April 23, 2020 (aged 88)
- Occupation: Psychohistorian

Lloyd deMause (pronounced de-Moss; September 19, 1931 – April 23, 2020) was an American lay psychoanalyst and social historian, best known for his pioneering work in the field of psychohistory.

He graduated from Columbia College and did graduate work in political science at Columbia University and later trained as a psychoanalyst. He taught psychohistory at the City University of New York. He is the founder of the Association for Psychohistory, which publishes the Journal of Psychohistory.

== Psychohistory ==
Beginning in the 1970s, DeMause began conceiving of psychohistory, a field of study of the psychological motivations of historical events, and their associated patterns of behavior. It seeks to understand the emotional origin of the social and political behavior of groups and nations—past and present—by analyzing events in childhood and the family, especially child abuse.

In 1973, deMause founded The Journal of Psychohistory, which the Association for Psychohistory says began as The History of Childhood Quarterly and was renamed in 1976.

== Legacy ==
In a 1994 interview with deMause in The New Yorker, interviewer Stephen Schiff wrote that "to buy into psychohistory, you have to subscribe to some fairly woolly assumptions [...], for instance, that a nation's child-rearing techniques affect its foreign policy", but confessed that "deMause's analyses have often been weirdly prescient."

== Controversy ==
Contributing to his ostracization from psychoanalytic circles, deMause was a contributor to the Satanic ritual abuse hysteria of the early 1990s, in part via the circulation of his article "Why Cults Terrorize and Kill Children", where he labelled skeptics of reports of the abuse "molesters" and "pedophile advocates". The article was used as a reliable source by ritual abuse proponents.

== Publications ==
DeMause published over 90 scholarly articles and several books.

=== Books ===
- DeMause, Lloyd (1974). The History of Childhood. New York: Harper and Row. ISBN 0061318485.
- DeMause, Lloyd (1975). A Bibliography of Psychohistory. Vol. 2. New York: Garland Pub. pp. 517–62. ISBN 9780824099992. PMID 11614558.
- DeMause, Lloyd (1975). The New Psychohistory. New York: Psychohistory Press. ISBN 0-914434-01-2.
- Ebel, Henry; DeMause, Lloyd (1977). Jimmy Carter and American Fantasy: Psychohistorical Explorations. New York: Two Continents. ISBN 0-8467-0363-7.
- DeMause, Lloyd (1982). Foundations of Psychohistory. New York: Creative Roots. ISBN 0-940508-01-X.
- DeMause, Lloyd (1984). Reagan's America. New York: Creative Roots. ISBN 0-940508-02-8.
- DeMause, Lloyd (1995). The History of Childhood (reprint). Northvale, New Jersey: Jason Aronson. ISBN 1-56821-551-7.
- DeMause, Lloyd (2002). The Emotional Life of Nations. New York: Karnac. ISBN 1-892746-98-0.
- DeMause, Lloyd (2010). The Origins of War in Child Abuse. The Institute for Psychohistory.

=== Articles (selection) ===
- DeMause, Lloyd (1974): The Evolution of Childhood. In: History of Childhood Quarterly: The Journal of Psychohistory, 1 (4), p. 503-575. (Comments and reply: p. 576-606)
- DeMause, Lloyd (1987): The History of Childhood in Japan. In: The Journal of Psychohistory, 15 (2), p. 147-151.
- DeMause, Lloyd (1988): On Writing Childhood History. In: The Journal of Psychohistory, 16 (2), p. 35-71.
- DeMause, Lloyd (1989): The Role of Adaptation and Selection in Psychohistorical Evolution. In: The Journal of Psychohistory, 16 (4), p. 355-372 (Comments and reply: p. S. 372–404).
- DeMause, Lloyd (1990): The History of Child Assault. In: The Journal of Psychohistory, 18 (1), p. 1-29.
- DeMause, Lloyd (1991): The Universality of Incest. In: The Journal of Psychohistory, 19 (1), p. 123-164.
- DeMause, Lloyd (1997): The Psychogenic Theory of History. In: The Journal of Psychohistory, 25 (1), p. 112-183.

== See also ==
- Early infanticidal childrearing
