= Estranged (film) =

- Directed by: D. J. Matrundola
- Written by: Raphaël Simard; D. J. Matrundola
- Produced by: D. J. Matrundola; Daniel Archambault; Agathe Gravel
- Starring: Freya Ravensbergen; Éléonore Lamothe; Paul Burke
- Cinematography: Nelson Gauthier
- Edited by: D.J. Matrundola
- Music by: Martin Maheux; Raphaël Simard
- Release date: September 1, 2006
- Running time: 20 minutes
- Country: Canada
- Language: English

Estranged is a 2006, 20-minute short film directed by D. J. Matrundola. The film is about a character named Chloe who is forced to reunite with her estranged brother, Julian, and drive down to their mother's hometown. Julian shows up with a precocious twelve-year-old girl named Suzy, unwanted by her divorcing parents and hitching a ride to her aunt's house.

== Cast ==
- Freya Ravensbergen as Chloe
- Éléonore Lamothe as Suzy
- Paul Burke as Julian

== Critical reception ==
- "Estranged is only 20 minutes yet it packs a lot of punch". --Ryan Cracknell, Movie Views
- "Estranged is an entertaining dysfunctional family short, with talent behind every inch of film". --Felix Vasquez Jr., Cinema Crazed

== Festivals ==
- The Australian International Film Festival (Official Selection)
- Secret City Film Festival (Official Selection)
- Fylmz Festival (Official Selection)
- Anchorage Film Festival (Official Selection)
- DNA Film Festival (Official Selection)
- Victoria Film Festival (Official Selection)
