= Paige L. Sweet =

American sociologist

- Occupation: Sociologist

Academic background
- Education: University of Illinois Chicago
- Thesis: "Traumatizing Politics: Legibility & Survivorhood after Domestic Violence" (2018)

Academic work
- Institutions: Harvard University; University of Michigan
- Notable works: The Politics of Surviving: How Women Navigate Domestic Violence and Its Aftermath (2021)

Paige L. Sweet (born 1987) is a sociologist at the University of Michigan, working in the areas of gender and sexuality, knowledge, gender-based violence. Sweet has received attention for her work on gaslighting in relationships and the workplace. She is the author of The Politics of Surviving: How Women Navigate Domestic Violence and Its Aftermath (University of California Press, 2021).

== Career ==
In 2018, Sweet received her PhD in sociology from the University of Illinois Chicago.

Sweet is the author of the article “The Sociology of Gaslighting” published in the American Sociological Review (2019), for which she received an award from the American Sociological Association. She has written the book The Politics of Surviving: How Women Navigate Domestic Violence and its Aftermath (2021).

As of 2020, she teaches at the University of Michigan, where she studies gaslighting in relationships and in the workplace. She argues that gaslighting is mostly a sociological phenomenon made possible by social inequalities, including gender. She has related gaslighting to sexual situations, medicine, the legal system, and to the work place.

== Selected publications ==
=== Articles ===
- Sweet, Paige L. (1 October 2019). "The Sociology of Gaslighting". American Sociological Review. 84 (5): 851–875. doi:10.1177/0003122419874843. ISSN 0003-1224. S2CID 204375723.
- Sweet, Paige L. (1 September 2015). "Chronic Victims, Risky Women: Domestic Violence Advocacy and the Medicalization of Abuse". Signs: Journal of Women in Culture and Society. 41 (1): 81–106. doi:10.1086/681772. ISSN 0097-9740. S2CID 147137732.
- Sweet, Paige L. (1 December 2014). "'Every bone of my body:' Domestic violence and the diagnostic body". Social Science & Medicine. 122: 44–52. doi:10.1016/j.socscimed.2014.10.014. ISSN 0277-9536. PMID 25441316.

=== Books ===
- The Politics of Surviving: How Women Navigate Domestic Violence and Its Aftermath. University of California Press. 2021. ISBN 978-0-520-37770-7.
