= Journal of Psychohistory =

- Winter 1998 cover
- Discipline: Psychology, psychohistory
- Language: English
- Edited by: Lloyd deMause

Publication details
- History: 1973–present
- Publisher: Association for Psychohistory

Standard abbreviations
- ISO 4: J. Psychohist.

Indexing
- ISSN: 0145-3378
- OCLC no.: 2428996

Links
- The Journal of Psychohistory

The Journal of Psychohistory is a journal established in 1973 in the field of psychohistory, edited by Lloyd deMause. It is published independently by the Institute for Psychohistory (IP). The journal has been published under its current name since 1976, before which it was titled History of Childhood Quarterly.

The journal aims to provide "a new psychological view of world events — past and present". The journal is published quarterly and contains subjects such as childhood and the family (especially child abuse), psychobiography with extensive childhood material, political psychology and psychological studies of anthropology.

== History ==
In 1974, DeMause's company The Souvenir Press published a book entitled The History of Childhood, consisting of essays by historians and psychoanalysts who, by analyzing primary sources, aimed to construct "an empirically accurate history of childhood".

The book proved influential among psychoanalysts and mental health practitioners. Reuben Fine remarked it might someday mark "a turning point in the integration of the social sciences", while Erich Fromm called it "just magnificent — an extremely important contribution to the knowledge of man."

The project continued as a journal titled first History of Childhood Quarterly, and later The Journal of Psychohistory. It rapidly grew influential, and deMause's theories grew more radical, particularly with regard to the scope and influence of child abuse throughout history. deMause, for example, excoriated Freud's choice to abandon his seduction theory. Due to its association with deMause, the Journal saw polarized reception among psychohistorians.

The journal published a wide range of perspectives and had no referee system. In a 1996 interview for the psychohistorical journal Clio's Psyche, deMause explained,

Most articles for The Journal are submissions by people who are uniquely qualified in their areas, who have no peers. I myself as editor check out each article at the library for accuracy of references, simply because I learn so much doing so.

The Association for Psychohistory clarifies that the Journal is peer-reviewed.

Historian and psychohistorian Thomas Kohut described the Journal of Psychohistory as exemplifying "the more frivolous and distasteful sort of psychohistory", compared to more "serious and scholarly" outlets.

In the Journal's Summer 1984 issue, prominent New York psychoanalyst Casper G. Schmidt published a paper called The Group-Fantasy Origins of AIDS, arguing that AIDS was not caused by a viral disease, but rather by "epidemic hysteria". Schmidt died of AIDS in 1994.

The Journal's Spring 1994 issue covered ritual abuse. DeMause's article Why Cults Terrorize and Kill Children, and Roland Summit's The Dark Tunnels of McMartin — the latter alleging tunnels were found underneath McMartin preschool — were both criticized for containing unsubstantiated claims.

At peak circulation, the Journal saw at least 8,000 subscribers. In 2009, the number had dwindled to about 2,000. As of 2026 the Journal continues to be published.
