= Kenneth A. Fuchsman =

Kenneth A. Fuchsman is an American scholar, professor emeritus in the anthropology department at the University of Connecticut, where he taught American history and interdisciplinary studies. From 2016 to 2020 he was president of the International Psychohistorical Association. He has written on US presidents John F. Kennedy, Richard Nixon, Barack Obama and Donald Trump.

== Selected publications ==
- Fuchsman, K. (2015). "Empathy and humanity". The Journal of Psychohistory. 42 (3): 176–187. ISSN 0145-3378. PMID 25630194.
- Maccoby, Michael; Fuchsman, Ken, eds. (2020). Psychoanalytic and historical perspectives on the leadership of Donald Trump: narcissism and marketing in an age of anxiety and distrust. Routledge. ISBN 978-0-367-42648-4. OCLC 1220908827.
- Fuchsman, Ken; Cohen, Keri S., eds. (2021). Healing, Rebirth and the Work of Michael Eigen: Collected Essays on a Pioneer in Psychoanalysis. Taylor & Francis Group. ISBN 978-1-000-33866-9. OCLC 1236261456.
