= Dwight D. Eisenhower =

World War II general, U.S. president from 1953 to 1961

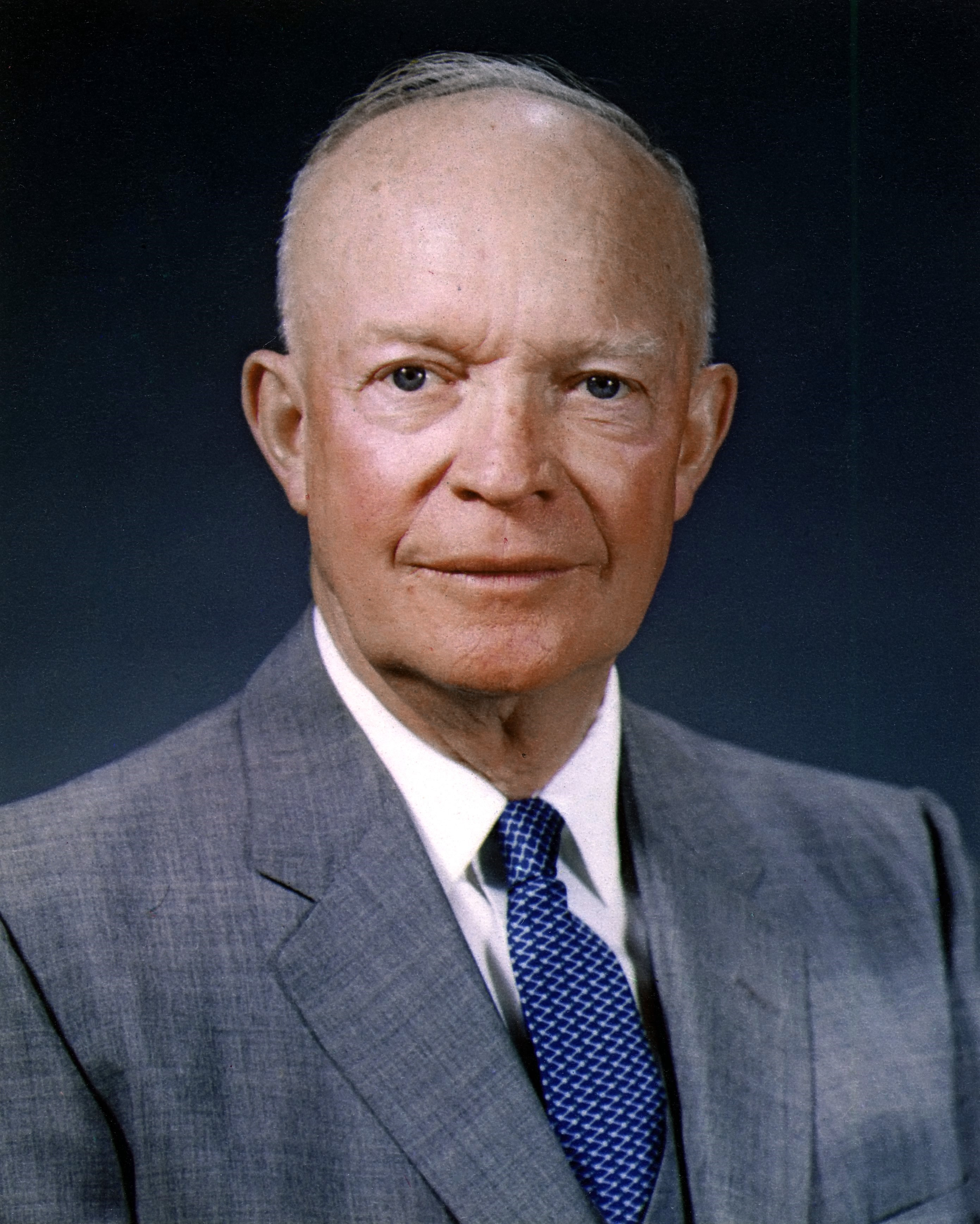
- Official portrait, 1959

34th President of the United States
- In office January 20, 1953 – January 20, 1961
- Vice President: Richard Nixon
- Preceded by: Harry S. Truman
- Succeeded by: John F. Kennedy

1st Supreme Allied Commander Europe
- In office April 2, 1951 – May 30, 1952
- President: Harry S. Truman
- Deputy: Bernard Montgomery
- Preceded by: Position established
- Succeeded by: Matthew Ridgway

13th President of Columbia University
- In office June 7, 1948 – January 19, 1953
- Preceded by: Nicholas Murray Butler
- Succeeded by: Grayson L. Kirk

16th Chief of Staff of the Army
- In office November 19, 1945 – February 6, 1948
- President: Harry S. Truman
- Deputy: J. Lawton Collins
- Preceded by: George C. Marshall
- Succeeded by: Omar Bradley

1st Military Governor of the American-occupied zone of Germany
- In office May 8, 1945 – November 10, 1945
- President: Harry S. Truman
- Preceded by: Position established
- Succeeded by: George S. Patton (acting)

Supreme Commander, Allied Expeditionary Force
- In office December 24, 1943 – July 14, 1945
- Appointed by: Franklin D. Roosevelt
- Deputy: Arthur Tedder
- Preceded by: Position established
- Succeeded by: Position abolished

Personal details
- Born: David Dwight Eisenhower; October 14, 1890 Denison, Texas, U.S.
- Died: March 28, 1969 (aged 78) Washington, D.C., U.S.
- Resting place: Dwight D. Eisenhower Presidential Library, Museum and Boyhood Home
- Party: Republican (from 1952)
- Other political affiliations: Democratic (1909)
- Spouse: Mamie Doud (m. 1916)
- Children: 2, including John
- Relatives: Eisenhower family
- Education: United States Military Academy (BS)
- Occupation: Military officer; politician
- Nickname: "Ike"

Military service
- Allegiance: United States
- Branch/service: United States Army
- Years of service: 1915–1953; 1961–1969
- Rank: General of the Army
- Battles/wars: See battles: Border War; Pancho Villa Expedition; World War I; World War II; North African campaign; Operation Torch; Battle of Port Lyautey; Tunisian campaign; Battle of Kasserine Pass; Italian campaign; Operation Husky; Allied invasion of Italy; Operation Avalanche; Operation Overlord; Normandy landings; Battle of the Falaise Pocket; Liberation of Paris; Operation Dragoon; Siegfried Line campaign; Operation Market Garden; Operation Queen; Battle of the Bulge; Western Allied invasion of Germany; Battle of Remagen; Occupation of Germany; Korean War
- Awards: Army Distinguished Service Medal (5); Navy Distinguished Service Medal; Legion of Merit
- Eisenhower's voice Eisenhower on military enforcement of school integration in Little Rock; Recorded September 24, 1957

Dwight David Eisenhower (Note: Pronounced /ˈaɪzənhaʊ.ər/ EYE-zən-how-ər) (October 14, 1890 – March 28, 1969) was the 34th president of the United States, serving from 1953 to 1961, and a U.S. Army general who commanded the Allied Expeditionary Force in the invasions of Normandy and Nazi Germany in World War II.

Eisenhower graduated from West Point in 1915. During World War I, he was denied a request to serve in Europe and instead commanded a unit that trained tank crews. Between the wars he served in staff positions in the US and the Philippines, reaching the rank of brigadier general shortly before the entry of the US into World War II in 1941. After further promotion Eisenhower oversaw the Allied invasions of North Africa and Sicily before supervising the invasions of France and Germany. After the war ended in Europe, he served as military governor of the American-occupied zone of Germany (1945), as Army Chief of Staff (1945–1948), president of Columbia University (1948–1953), and as the first supreme commander of NATO (1951–1952).

In 1952, Eisenhower entered the presidential race as a Republican, in part to block the presidential prospects of Senator Robert A. Taft, who opposed NATO and sought to undo the New Deal. Eisenhower won that year's election and the 1956 election in landslides, both times defeating Adlai Stevenson II. Eisenhower's main goals in office were to contain the spread of communism and reduce federal deficits.

In 1953, Eisenhower considered using nuclear weapons to end the Korean War and may have threatened China with nuclear attack if an armistice was not reached quickly. China did agree and an armistice resulted, which remains in effect. His New Look policy of nuclear deterrence prioritized "inexpensive" nuclear weapons while reducing funding for expensive Army divisions. He continued Harry S. Truman's policy of recognizing Taiwan as the legitimate government of China, and he won congressional approval of the Formosa Resolution. His administration provided aid to help the French try to fight Vietnamese Communists in the First Indochina War. After the French left, he gave strong financial support to the new state of South Vietnam.

Eisenhower supported regime-changing military coups in Iran and Guatemala orchestrated by his own administration. During the Suez Crisis of 1956, he condemned the Israeli, British, and French invasion of Egypt, and he forced them to withdraw. He also condemned the Soviet invasion during the Hungarian Revolution of 1956 but took no action. He deployed 15,000 soldiers during the 1958 Lebanon crisis. Near the end of his term, a summit meeting with the Soviet leader Nikita Khrushchev was cancelled when a US spy plane was shot down over the Soviet Union. Eisenhower approved the Bay of Pigs Invasion, which was left to John F. Kennedy to carry out.

Eisenhower continued New Deal agencies and expanded Social Security. He covertly opposed Joseph McCarthy and contributed to the end of McCarthyism by openly invoking executive privilege. He signed the Civil Rights Act of 1957 and sent Army troops to enforce federal court orders which integrated schools in Little Rock, Arkansas. His administration undertook the development and construction of the Interstate Highway System, which remains the largest construction of roadways in American history.

In 1957, following the Soviet launch of Sputnik, Eisenhower led the American response which included the creation of NASA and the establishment of a stronger, science-based education via the National Defense Education Act. The Soviet Union began to reinforce their own space program, escalating the Space Race. His two terms saw unprecedented economic prosperity except for a minor recession in 1958. In his farewell address, he expressed his concerns about the dangers of massive military spending, particularly deficit spending and government contracts to private military manufacturers, which he dubbed "the military–industrial complex". Historical evaluations of his presidency place him among the upper tier of US presidents.

== Early life and education ==
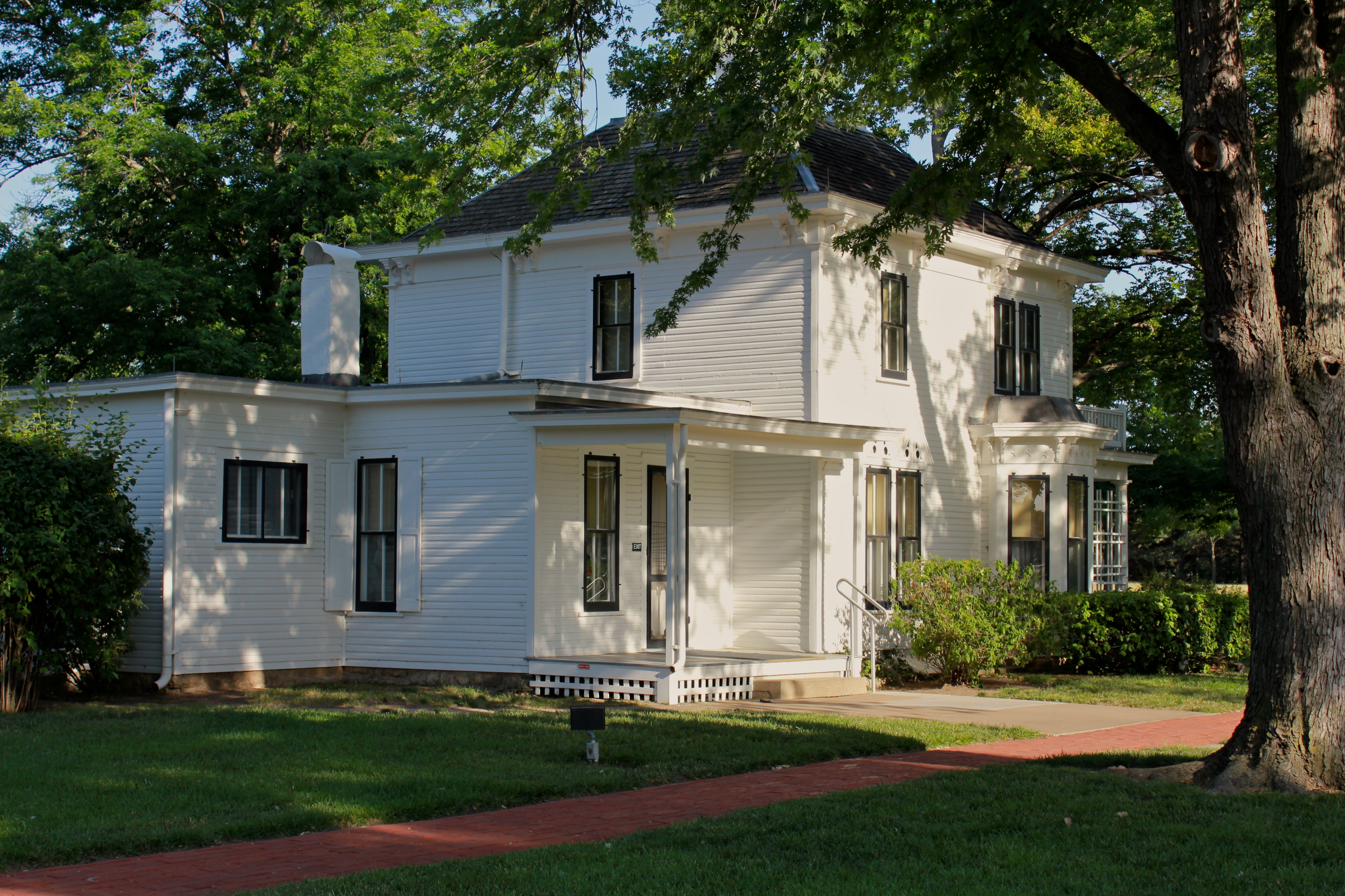
The Eisenhower family home in Abilene, Kansas

Eisenhower was born David Dwight Eisenhower in Denison, Texas on October 14, 1890, the third of seven sons born to Ida Stover and David Jacob Eisenhower. Soon after his birth, his mother reversed his two forenames to "Dwight David" to avoid the confusion of having two Davids in the family. He was named Dwight after the evangelist Dwight L. Moody. All of the boys were nicknamed "Ike", such as "Big Ike" (Edgar) and "Little Ike" (Dwight); the nickname was intended as an abbreviation of their last name. By World War II, only Dwight was still called "Ike".

In 1892, the family moved to Abilene, Kansas, which Eisenhower considered his hometown. As a child, he was involved in an accident that cost his younger brother Earl an eye, for which he was remorseful for the remainder of his life. Eisenhower developed a keen and enduring interest in exploring the outdoors. He learned about hunting and fishing, cooking, and card playing from a man named Bob Davis who camped on the Smoky Hill River.

While his mother was against war, it was her collection of history books that first sparked Eisenhower's interest in military history. He became a voracious reader on the subject. Other favorite subjects early in his education were arithmetic and spelling.

Eisenhower's parents set aside specific times at breakfast and at dinner for daily family Bible reading. Chores were regularly assigned and rotated among all the children, and misbehavior was met with unequivocal discipline, usually from David. His mother, previously a member (with David) of the River Brethren (Brethren in Christ Church) sect of the Mennonites, joined the International Bible Students Association, later known as Jehovah's Witnesses. The Eisenhower home served as the local meeting hall from 1896 to 1915, though Dwight never joined. His later decision to attend West Point saddened his mother, who felt that warfare was "rather wicked", but she did not overrule his decision.

Speaking of himself in 1948, Eisenhower said he was "one of the most deeply religious men I know" though unattached to any "sect or organization". He was baptized in the Presbyterian Church in 1953.

Eisenhower attended Abilene High School and graduated in 1909. As a freshman, he injured his knee and developed a leg infection that extended into his groin, which his doctor diagnosed as life-threatening. The doctor insisted that the leg be amputated but Dwight refused to allow it, and surprisingly recovered, though he had to repeat his freshman year. He and brother Edgar both wanted to attend college, though they lacked the funds. They made a pact to take alternate years at college while the other worked to earn the tuitions.

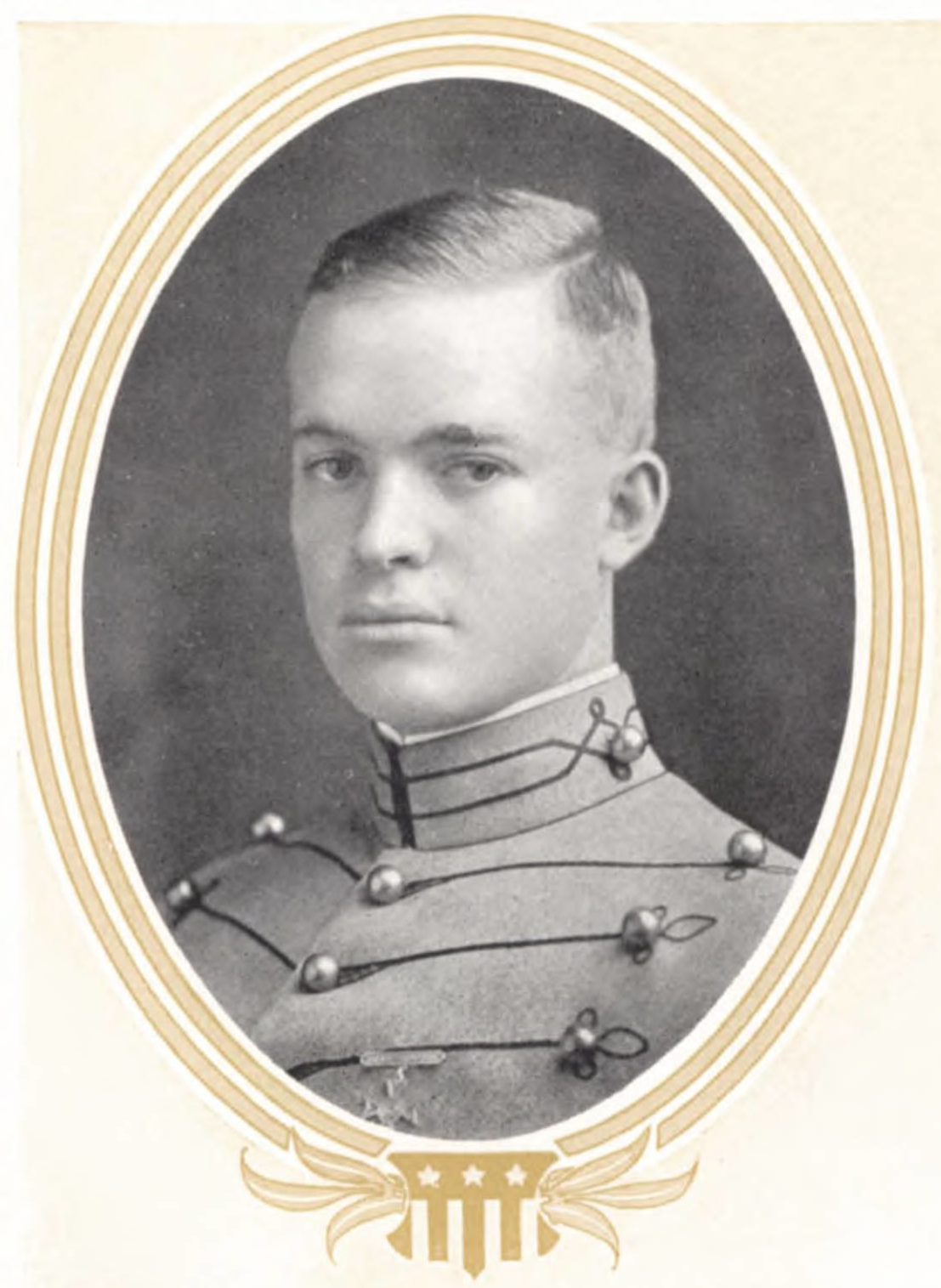
West Point yearbook photo, 1915

Edgar took the first turn at school, and Dwight was employed as a night supervisor at the Belle Springs Creamery. When Edgar asked for a second year, Dwight consented. At that time a friend, Edward "Swede" Hazlett, was applying to the Naval Academy and urged Dwight to apply, since no tuition was required. Eisenhower requested consideration for either Annapolis or West Point with his Senator, Joseph L. Bristow. Though Eisenhower was among the winners of the entrance-exam competition, he was beyond the age limit for the Naval Academy. He accepted an appointment to West Point in 1911.

At West Point, Eisenhower relished the emphasis on traditions and on sports, but was less enthusiastic about the hazing, although he willingly accepted it as a plebe. He was also a regular violator of the more detailed regulations and finished school with a less than stellar discipline rating. Academically, Eisenhower's best subject by far was English. Otherwise, his performance was average, although he thoroughly enjoyed the typical emphasis of engineering on science and mathematics.

In athletics, Eisenhower later said that "not making the baseball team at West Point was one of the greatest disappointments of my life, maybe my greatest". He made the varsity football team and was a starter at halfback in 1912, when he tried to tackle the legendary Jim Thorpe of the Carlisle Indians. Eisenhower suffered a torn knee while being tackled in the next game, which was the last he played; he reinjured his knee on horseback and in the boxing ring, so he turned to fencing and gymnastics.

Eisenhower later served as junior varsity football coach and cheerleader, which caught the attention of General Frederick Funston. He graduated from West Point in the middle of the class of 1915, which became known as "the class the stars fell on", because 59 members eventually became general officers. After graduation in 1915, Second Lieutenant Eisenhower requested an assignment in the Philippines, which was denied; because of the ongoing Mexican Revolution, he was posted to Fort Sam Houston in San Antonio, Texas, under the command of General Funston. In 1916, while stationed at Fort Sam Houston, Funston convinced him to become the football coach for Peacock Military Academy; he later became the coach at St. Louis College, now St. Mary's University, and was an honorary member of the Sigma Beta Chi fraternity there.

== Personal life ==
While Eisenhower was stationed in Texas, he met Mamie Doud of Boone, Iowa. They were immediately taken with each other. He proposed to her on Valentine's Day in 1916. A November wedding date in Denver, Colorado, was moved up to July 1 due to the impending American entry into World War I; Funston approved 10 days of leave for their wedding. The Eisenhowers moved many times during their first 35 years of marriage.

The Eisenhowers had two sons. In late 1917 while he was in charge of training at Fort Oglethorpe in Georgia, his wife Mamie had their first son, Doud Dwight "Icky" Eisenhower, who died of scarlet fever at the age of three. Eisenhower was mostly reluctant to discuss his death. Their second son, John Eisenhower, was born in 1922 in Denver.

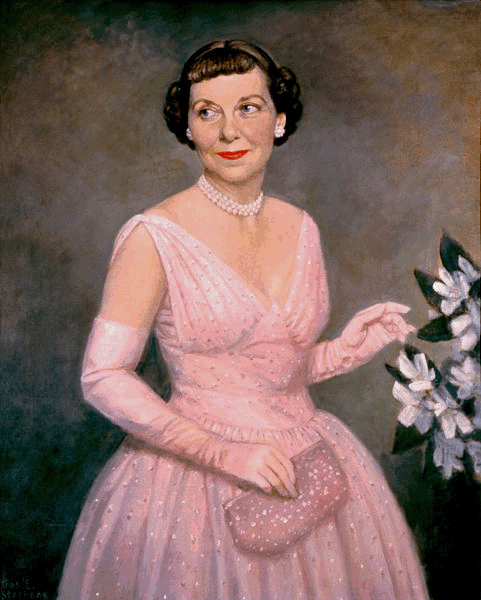
Mamie Eisenhower, painted in 1953 by Thomas E. Stephens

Eisenhower was a golf enthusiast later in life, and he joined the Augusta National Golf Club in 1948. He played golf frequently during and after his presidency and was unreserved in his passion for the game, to the point of golfing during winter; he ordered his golf balls painted black so he could see them better against snow. He had a basic golf facility installed at Camp David, and he became close friends with the Augusta National Chairman Clifford Roberts, inviting Roberts to stay at the White House on numerous occasions. Roberts, an investment broker, also handled the Eisenhower family's investments.

He began oil painting while at Columbia University, after watching Thomas E. Stephens paint Mamie's portrait. Eisenhower painted about 260 oils during the last 20 years of his life. The images were mostly landscapes but also included portraits of subjects such as Mamie, their grandchildren, Field Marshal Bernard Montgomery, George Washington, and Abraham Lincoln. Wendy Beckett stated that Eisenhower's paintings, "simple and earnest", caused her to "wonder at the hidden depths of this reticent president". A conservative in both art and politics, Eisenhower in a 1962 speech denounced modern art as "a piece of canvas that looks like a broken-down Tin Lizzie, loaded with paint, has been driven over it".

Angels in the Outfield was Eisenhower's favorite movie. His favorite reading material for relaxation were the Western novels of Zane Grey. With his excellent memory and ability to focus, Eisenhower was skilled at cards. He learned poker, which he called his "favorite indoor sport", in Abilene. Eisenhower recorded West Point classmates' poker losses for payment after graduation and later stopped playing because his opponents resented having to pay him. A friend reported that after learning to play contract bridge at West Point, Eisenhower played the game six nights a week for five months. Eisenhower continued to play bridge throughout his military career. While stationed in the Philippines, he played regularly with President Manuel Quezon, earning him the nickname the "Bridge Wizard of Manila". An unwritten qualification for an officer's appointment to Eisenhower's staff during World War II was the ability to play bridge. He played even during the stressful weeks leading up to the D-Day landings. His favorite partner was General Alfred Gruenther, considered the best player in the US Army; he appointed Gruenther his second-in-command at NATO partly because of his skill at bridge. Saturday night bridge games at the White House were a feature of his presidency. He was a strong player, though not an expert by modern standards. The great bridge player and popularizer Ely Culbertson described his game as classic and sound with "flashes of brilliance" and said that "you can always judge a man's character by the way he plays cards. Eisenhower is a calm and collected player and never whines at his losses. He is brilliant in victory but never commits the bridge player's worst crime of gloating when he wins." Bridge expert Oswald Jacoby frequently participated in the White House games and said, "The President plays better bridge than golf. He tries to break 90 at golf. At bridge, you would say he plays in the 70s."

== World War I (1914–1918) ==
Eisenhower served initially in logistics and then the infantry at various camps in Texas and Georgia until 1918. When the US entered World War I, he immediately requested an overseas assignment but was denied and assigned to Ft. Leavenworth, Kansas. In February 1918, he was transferred to Camp Meade in Maryland with the 65th Engineers. His unit was later ordered to France, but, to his chagrin, he received orders for the Tank Corps, where he was promoted to brevet lieutenant colonel in the National Army. He commanded a unit that trained tank crews at Camp Colt – his first command. Though Eisenhower and his tank crews never saw combat, he displayed excellent organizational skills as well as an ability to accurately assess junior officers' strengths and make optimal placements of personnel.

His spirits were raised when the unit under his command received orders overseas to France. This time his wishes were thwarted when the armistice was signed a week before his departure date. Completely missing out on the warfront left him depressed and bitter for a time, despite receiving the Distinguished Service Medal for his work at home. In World War II, rivals who had combat service in the Great War (led by Gen. Bernard Montgomery) sought to denigrate Eisenhower for his previous lack of combat duty, despite his stateside experience establishing a camp for thousands of troops and developing a full combat training schedule.

== Between the Wars (1918–1939) ==
=== In service of generals ===
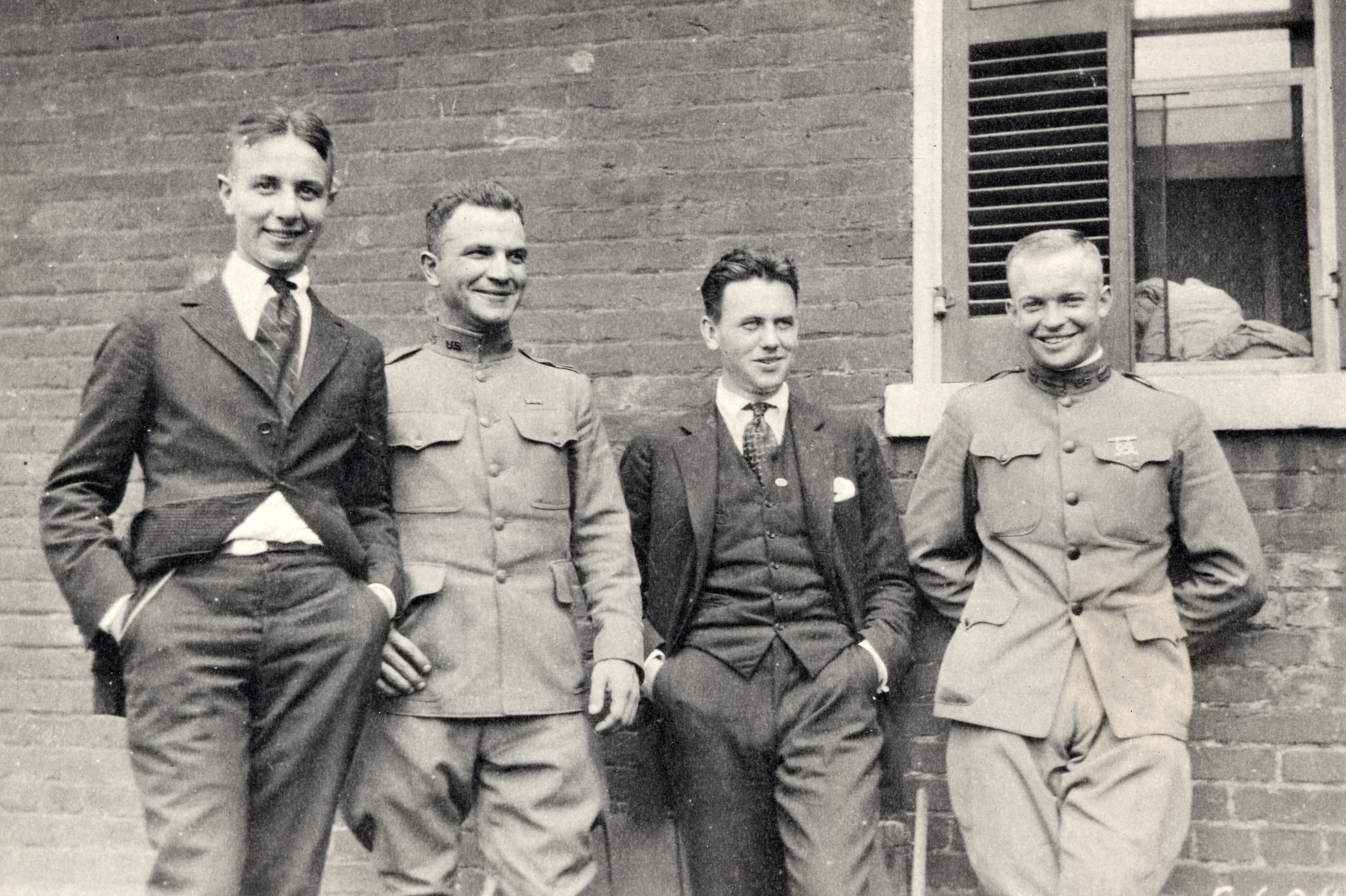
Eisenhower (far right) with friends William Stuhler, Major Brett, and Paul V. Robinson in 1919, four years after graduating from the United States Military Academy at West Point

After the war, Eisenhower reverted to his regular rank of captain and a few days later was promoted to major, a rank he held for 16 years. The major was assigned in 1919 to a transcontinental Army convoy to test vehicles and dramatize the need for improved roads. Indeed, the convoy averaged only 5 miles per hour (8 km/h) from Washington, D.C. to San Francisco; later the improvement of highways became a signature issue for Eisenhower as president.

He assumed duties again at Camp Meade, Maryland, where he commanded a battalion of tanks. Eisenhower and his wife stayed for a time at Mrs. Ray’s Boarding House in Laurel due to a housing shortage at Camp Meade. He remained at Meade until 1922. His schooling continued, focused on the nature of the next war and the role of the tank. His new expertise in tank warfare was strengthened by a close collaboration with George S. Patton, Sereno E. Brett, and other senior tank leaders. Their leading-edge ideas of speed-oriented offensive tank warfare were strongly discouraged by superiors, who considered the new approach too radical and preferred to continue using tanks in a strictly supportive role for the infantry. Eisenhower was even threatened with court-martial for continued publication of these proposed methods of tank deployment, and he relented.

From 1920, Eisenhower served under a succession of talented generals – Fox Conner, John J. Pershing, Douglas MacArthur, and George Marshall. He first became executive officer to General Conner in the Panama Canal Zone, where, joined by Mamie, he served until 1924. Under Conner's tutelage, he studied military history and theory (including Carl von Clausewitz's On War), and later cited Conner's enormous influence on his military thinking, saying in 1962 that "Fox Conner was the ablest man I ever knew." Conner's comment on Eisenhower was, "[He] is one of the most capable, efficient and loyal officers I have ever met." On Conner's recommendation, in 1925–1926 he attended the Command and General Staff College at Fort Leavenworth, Kansas, where he graduated first in a class of 245 officers.

During the late 1920s and early 1930s, Eisenhower's career stalled somewhat, as military priorities diminished; many of his friends resigned for high-paying business jobs. He was assigned to the American Battle Monuments Commission directed by General Pershing, and with the help of his brother Milton Eisenhower, then a journalist at the Agriculture Department, he produced a guide to American battlefields in Europe. He then was assigned to the Army War College and graduated in 1928. After a one-year assignment in France, Eisenhower served as executive officer to General George V. Moseley, Assistant Secretary of War, from 1929 to February 1933. Major Eisenhower graduated from the Army Industrial College in 1933 and later served on the faculty (it was later expanded to become the Industrial College of the Armed Services and is now known as the Dwight D. Eisenhower School for National Security and Resource Strategy).

His primary duty was planning for the next war, which proved most difficult in the midst of the Great Depression. He then was posted as chief military aide to General Douglas MacArthur, Army Chief of Staff. In 1932, he participated in the clearing of the Bonus March encampment in Washington, D.C. Although he was against the actions taken against the veterans and strongly advised MacArthur against taking a public role in it, he later wrote the Army's official incident report, endorsing MacArthur's conduct.

=== Philippine tenure (1935–1939) ===
In 1935, Eisenhower accompanied MacArthur to the Philippines, where he served as assistant military adviser to the Philippine government in developing their army. MacArthur allowed Eisenhower to handpick an officer whom he thought would contribute to the mission. Hence he chose James Ord, a classmate of his at West Point. Having been brought up in Mexico, which inculcated into him the Spanish culture which influenced both Mexico and the Philippines, Ord was deemed the right pick for the job. Eisenhower had strong philosophical disagreements with MacArthur regarding the role of the Philippine Army and the leadership qualities that an American army officer should exhibit and develop in his subordinates. The antipathy between Eisenhower and MacArthur lasted the rest of their lives.

Historians have concluded that this assignment provided valuable preparation for handling the challenging personalities of Winston Churchill, George S. Patton, George Marshall, and Bernard Montgomery during World War II. Eisenhower later emphasized that too much had been made of the disagreements with MacArthur and that a positive relationship endured. While in Manila, Mamie suffered a life-threatening stomach ailment but recovered fully. Eisenhower was promoted to the rank of permanent lieutenant colonel in 1936. He learned to fly with the Philippine Army Air Corps at the Zablan Airfield in Camp Murphy under Captain Jesus Villamor, making a solo flight over the Philippines in 1937, obtaining his private pilot's license in 1939 at Fort Lewis. Around this time, he was offered a post by the Philippine Commonwealth government, specifically by Philippine president Manuel L. Quezon on the recommendation of MacArthur, to become the chief of police of a new capital being planned, now named Quezon City, but he declined the offer.

== World War II (1939–1945) ==
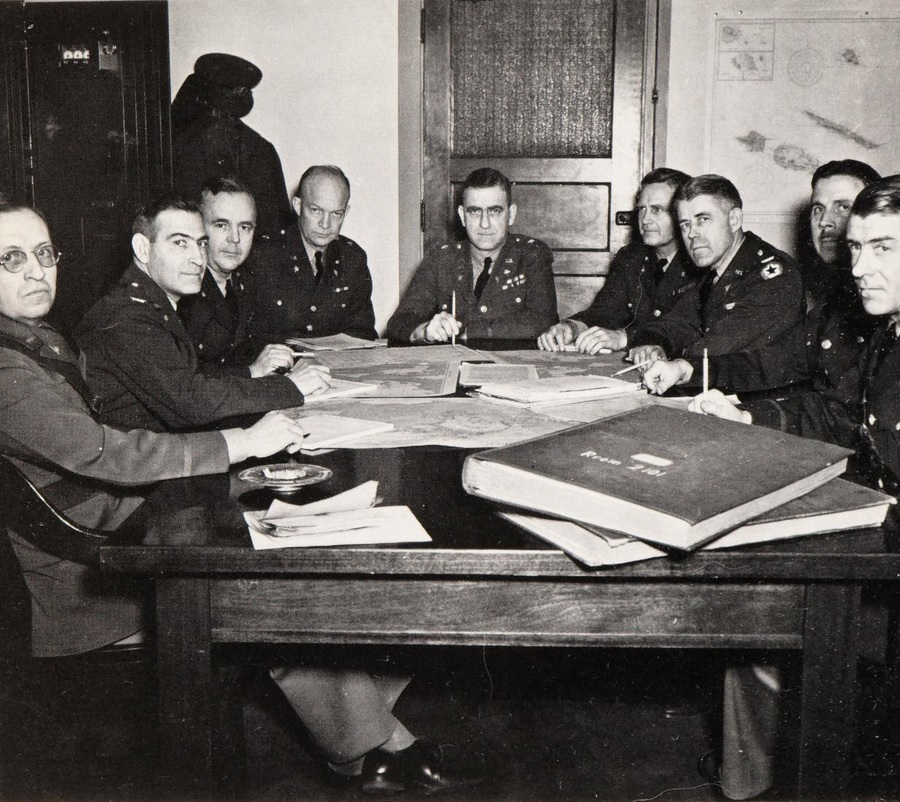
The meeting of War Plans Division, War Department General Staff in 1942

Eisenhower returned to the United States in December 1939 and was assigned as commanding officer of the 1st Battalion, 15th Infantry Regiment at Fort Lewis, Washington, later becoming the regimental executive officer. In March 1941 he was promoted to colonel and assigned as chief of staff of the newly activated IX Corps under Major General Kenyon Joyce. In June 1941, he was appointed chief of staff to General Walter Krueger, Commander of the Third Army, at Fort Sam Houston in San Antonio, Texas. After successfully participating in the Louisiana Maneuvers, he was promoted to brigadier general on October 3, 1941.

After the Japanese attack on Pearl Harbor, Eisenhower was assigned to the General Staff in Washington, where he served until June 1942 with responsibility for creating the major war plans to defeat Japan and Germany. He was appointed Deputy Chief in charge of Pacific Defenses under the Chief of War Plans Division (WPD), General Leonard T. Gerow, and then succeeded Gerow as Chief of the War Plans Division. Next, he was appointed Assistant Chief of Staff in charge of the new Operations Division (which replaced WPD) under Chief of Staff General George C. Marshall, who spotted talent and promoted accordingly.

At the end of May 1942, Eisenhower accompanied Lt. Gen. Henry H. Arnold, commanding general of the Army Air Forces, to London to assess the effectiveness of the theater commander in England, Maj. Gen. James E. Chaney. He returned to Washington on June 3 with a pessimistic assessment, stating he had an "uneasy feeling" about Chaney and his staff. On June 23, 1942, he returned to London as Commanding General, European Theater of Operations (ETOUSA), based in London and with a house in Coombe, Kingston upon Thames, and took over command of ETOUSA from Chaney. He was promoted to lieutenant general on July 7.

=== Operations Torch and Avalanche ===
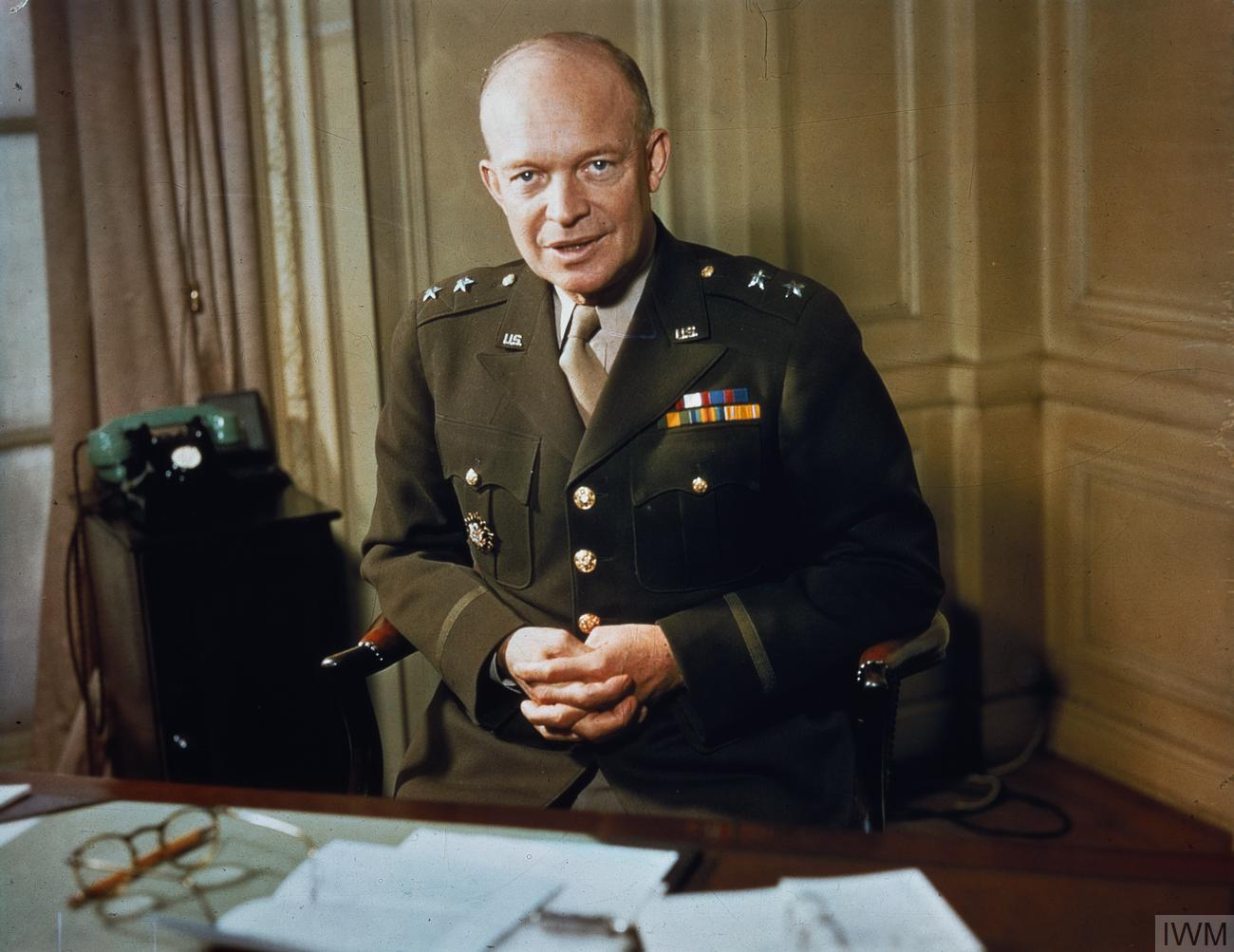
Eisenhower as a major general (1942)

In November 1942, Eisenhower was appointed Supreme Commander Allied Expeditionary Force of the North African Theater of Operations (NATOUSA) through the new operational Headquarters Allied (Expeditionary) Force Headquarters (A(E)FHQ). The word "expeditionary" was dropped soon after his appointment for security reasons. The campaign in North Africa was designated Operation Torch and was planned in the underground headquarters within the Rock of Gibraltar. Eisenhower was the first non-British person to command Gibraltar in 200 years.

French cooperation was deemed necessary to the campaign and Eisenhower encountered a "preposterous situation" with the multiple rival factions in France. His primary objective was to move forces successfully into Tunisia and intending to facilitate that objective, he gave his support to François Darlan as High Commissioner in North Africa, despite Darlan's previous high offices in Vichy France and his continued role as commander-in-chief of the French armed forces. The Allied leaders were "thunderstruck" by this from a political standpoint, though none had offered Eisenhower guidance with the problem in planning the operation. Eisenhower was severely criticized for the move. Darlan was assassinated on December 24 by Fernand Bonnier de La Chapelle, a French antifascist monarchist. Eisenhower later appointed as High Commissioner General Henri Giraud, who had been installed by the Allies as Darlan's commander-in-chief.

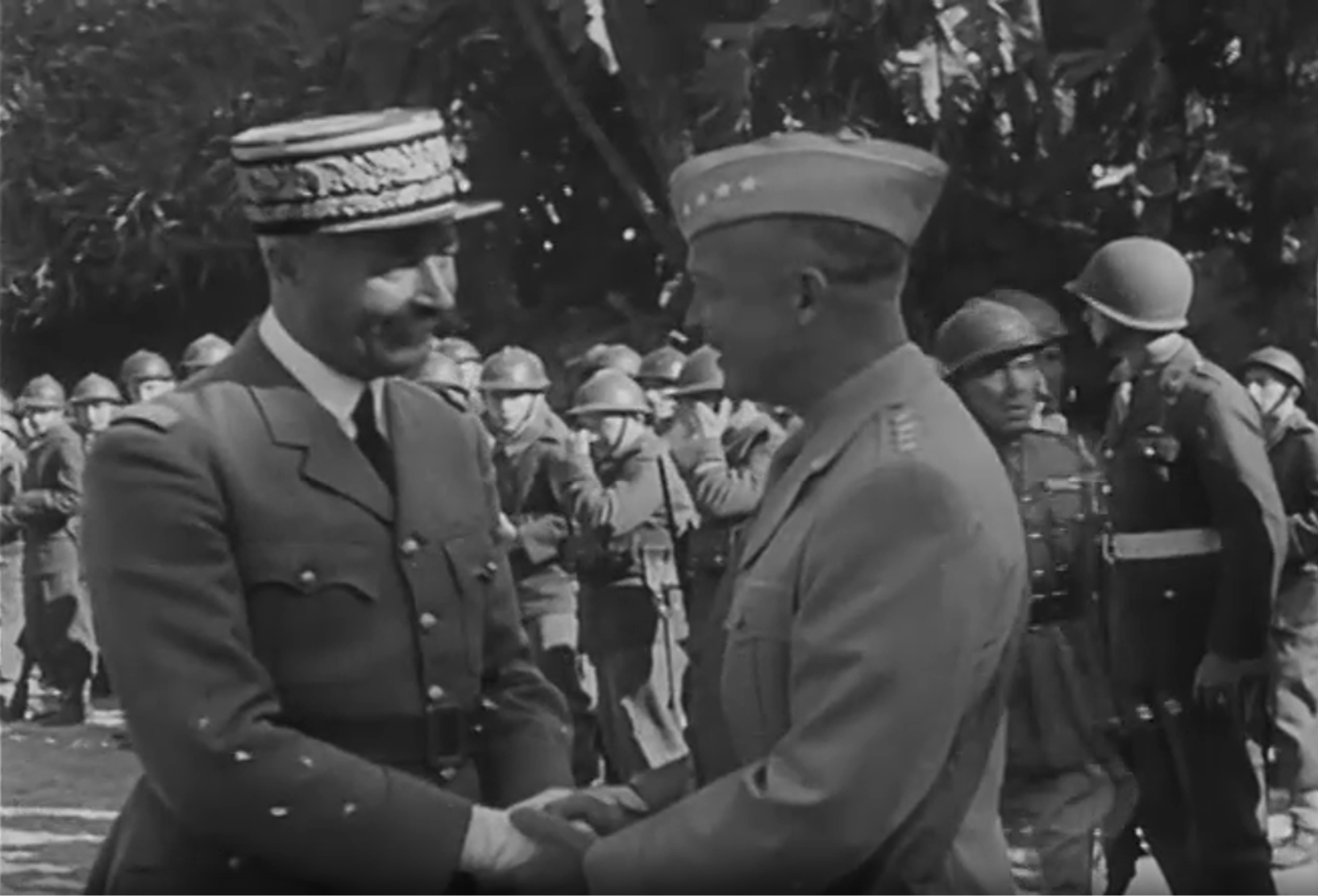
Eisenhower (right) after having been awarded the Légion d'honneur by French Civil and Military Commander-in-Chief Henri Giraud (left) (May 1943)

Operation Torch served as a valuable training ground for Eisenhower's combat command skills; during the initial phase of Generalfeldmarschall Erwin Rommel's move into the Kasserine Pass, Eisenhower created some confusion in the ranks by interference with the execution of battle plans by his subordinates. He was initially indecisive in his removal of Lloyd Fredendall, commanding II Corps. He became more adroit in such matters in later campaigns.

In February 1943, Eisenhower's authority was extended as commander of Allied Force Headquarters (AFHQ) across the Mediterranean basin to include the British Eighth Army, commanded by General Sir Bernard Montgomery. The Eighth Army had advanced across the Western Desert from the east and was ready for the start of the Tunisia Campaign.

Photograph of Allied commander-in-chief, Eisenhower, and Major General Omar Bradley touring the Tunisian Front, January 1943.

After the capitulation of Axis forces in North Africa, Eisenhower oversaw the invasion of Sicily. Once Mussolini, the Italian leader, had fallen in Italy, the Allies switched their attention to the mainland with Operation Avalanche. But while Eisenhower argued with President Roosevelt and British Prime Minister Churchill, who both insisted on unconditional surrender in exchange for helping the Italians, the Germans pursued an aggressive buildup of forces in the country. The Germans made the already tough battle more difficult by adding 19 divisions and initially outnumbering the Allied forces 2 to 1.

=== Supreme Allied commander and Operation Overlord ===
General Eisenhower reads his order of the day for June 5, 1944, the day before D-Day.

In December 1943, President Roosevelt decided that Eisenhower – not Marshall – would be Supreme Allied Commander in Europe. The following month, he resumed command of ETOUSA and the following month was officially designated as the Supreme Allied Commander of the Allied Expeditionary Force (SHAEF), serving in a dual role until the end of hostilities in Europe in May 1945. He was charged in these positions with planning and carrying out the Allied assault on the coast of Normandy in June 1944 under the code name Operation Overlord, the liberation of Western Europe and the invasion of Germany.

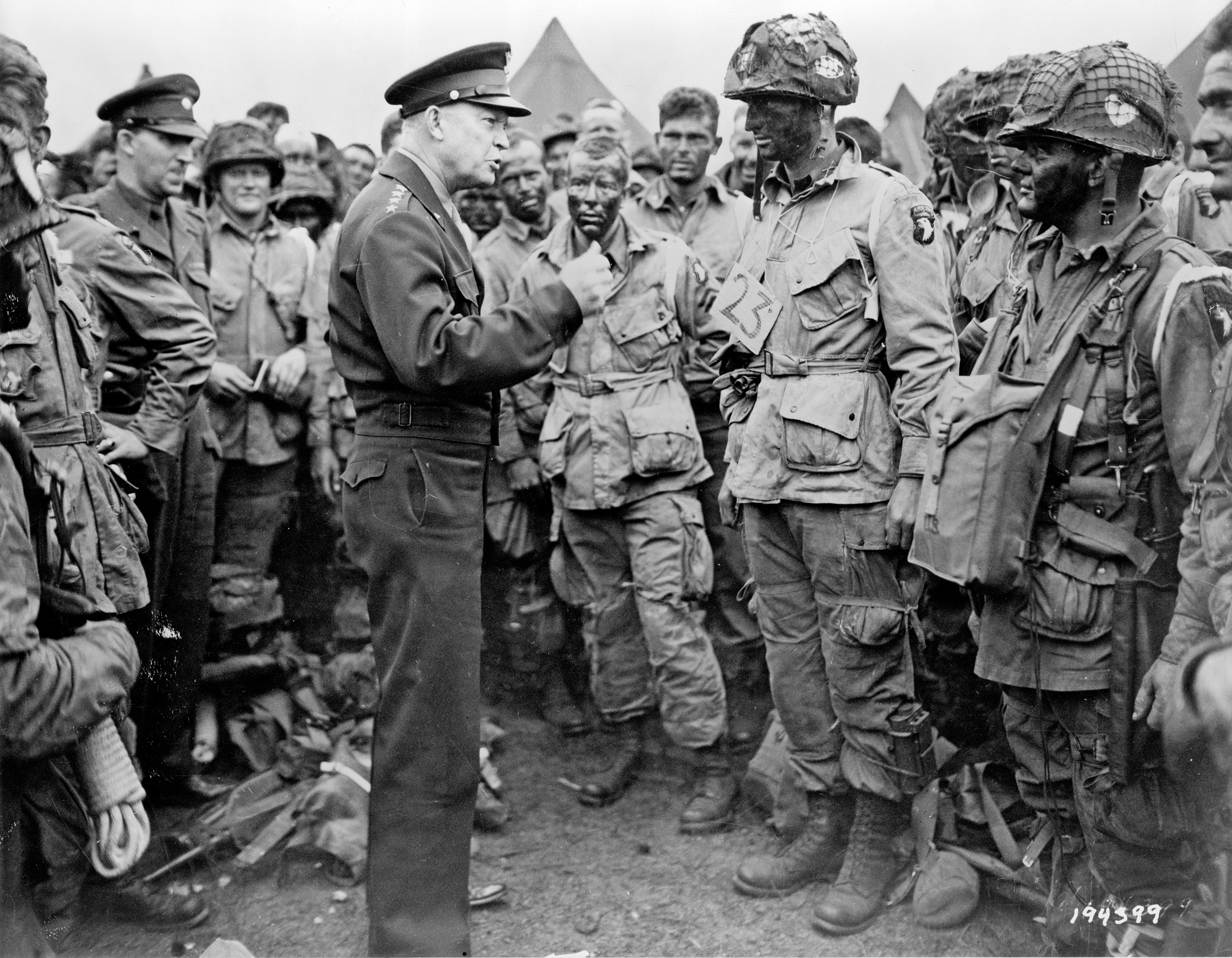
Eisenhower speaks with men of the 502nd Parachute Infantry Regiment (PIR), part of the 101st "Screaming Eagles" Airborne Division, on June 5, 1944, the day before the D-Day invasion. The officer Eisenhower is speaking to is First Lieutenant Wallace Strobel.

Eisenhower, as well as the officers and troops under him, had learned valuable lessons in their previous operations, and their skills had all strengthened in preparation for the next most difficult campaign against the Germans—a beach landing assault. His first struggles, however, were with Allied leaders and officers on matters vital to the success of the Normandy invasion; he argued with Roosevelt over an essential agreement with De Gaulle to use French resistance forces in covert operations against the Germans in advance of Operation Overlord. Admiral Ernest J. King fought with Eisenhower over King's refusal to provide additional landing craft from the Pacific. Eisenhower also insisted that the British give him exclusive command over all strategic air forces to facilitate Overlord, to the point of threatening to resign unless Churchill relented, which he did. Eisenhower then designed a bombing plan in France in advance of Overlord and argued with Churchill over the latter's concern with civilian casualties; de Gaulle interjected that the casualties were justified, and Eisenhower prevailed. He had to skillfully manage to retain the services of the often unruly George S. Patton, by severely reprimanding him when Patton earlier had slapped a subordinate, and then when Patton gave a speech in which he made improper comments about postwar policy.

The D-Day Normandy landings on June 6, 1944 were costly but successful. Two months later (August 15), the invasion of Southern France took place, and control of forces in the southern invasion passed from the AFHQ to the SHAEF. Many thought that victory in Europe would come by summer's end, but the Germans did not capitulate for almost a year. From then until the end of the war in Europe on May 8, 1945, Eisenhower, through SHAEF, commanded all Allied forces, and through his command of ETOUSA had administrative command of all US forces on the Western Front north of the Alps. He was ever mindful of the inevitable loss of life and suffering that would be experienced by the troops under his command and their families. This prompted him to make a point of visiting every division involved in the invasion. Eisenhower's sense of responsibility was underscored by his draft of a statement to be issued if the invasion failed. It has been called one of the great speeches of history:

Our landings in the Cherbourg-Havre area have failed to gain a satisfactory foothold and I have withdrawn the troops. My decision to attack at this time and place was based on the best information available. The troops, the air and the Navy did all that bravery and devotion to duty could do. If any blame or fault attaches to the attempt, it is mine alone.

=== Liberation of France and victory in Europe ===
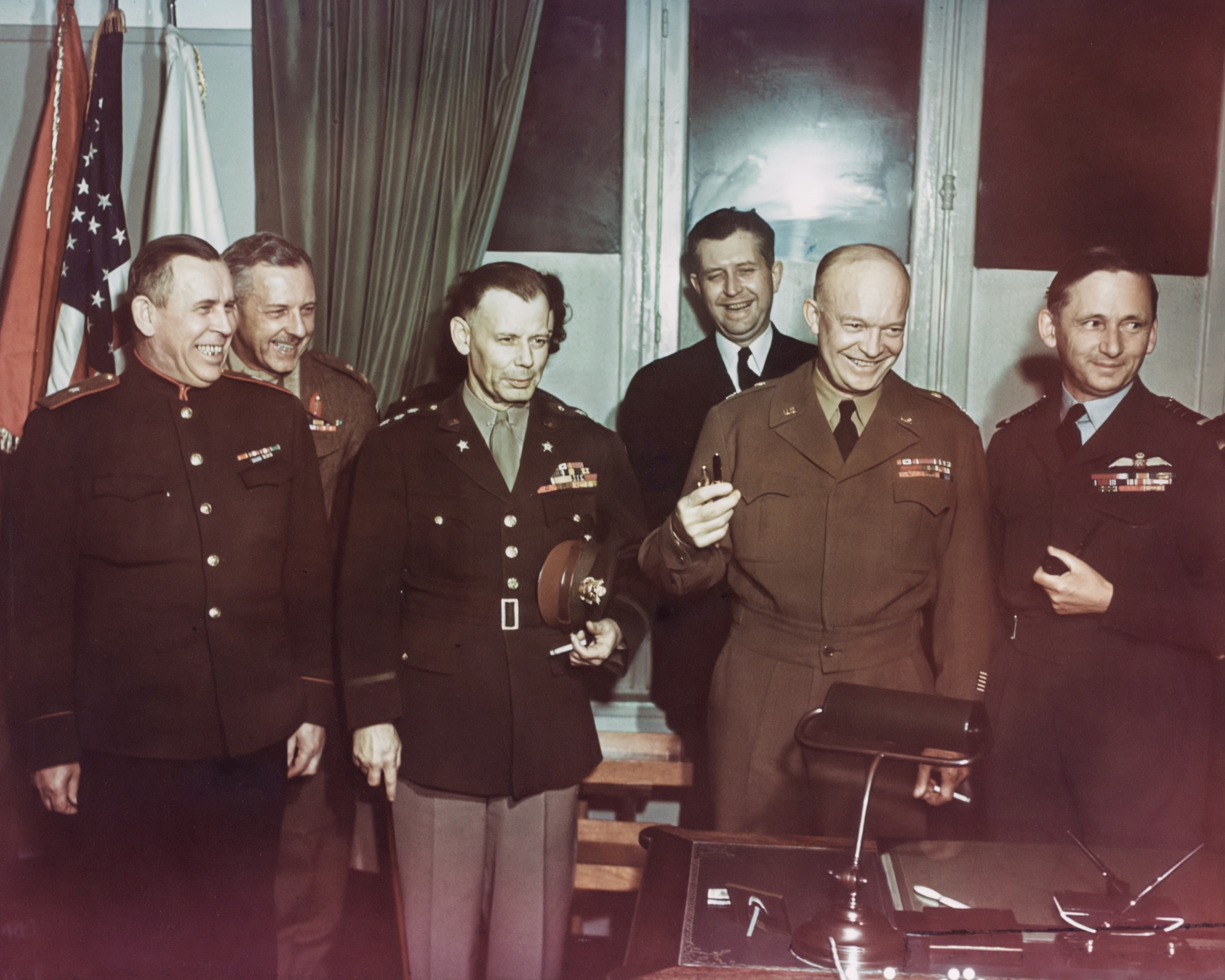
Eisenhower with Allied commanders following the signing of the German Instrument of Surrender at Reims

Every ground commander seeks the battle of annihilation; so far as conditions permit, he tries to duplicate in modern war the classic example of Cannae.

— Eisenhower

Once the coastal assault had succeeded, Eisenhower insisted on retaining personal control over the land battle strategy and was immersed in the command and supply of multiple assaults through France on Germany. Field Marshal Montgomery insisted priority be given to his 21st Army Group's attack being made in the north, while Generals Bradley (12th US Army Group) and Devers (Sixth US Army Group) insisted they be given priority in the center and south of the front (respectively). Eisenhower worked tirelessly to address the demands of the rival commanders to optimize Allied forces, often by giving them tactical latitude; many historians conclude this delayed the Allied victory in Europe. However, due to Eisenhower's persistence, the pivotal supply port at Antwerp was successfully, albeit belatedly, opened in late 1944.

In recognition of his senior position in the Allied command, on December 20, 1944, he was promoted to General of the Army, equivalent to the rank of Field Marshal in most European armies. In this and the previous high commands he held, Eisenhower showed his great talents for leadership and diplomacy. Although he had never seen action himself, he won the respect of front-line commanders. He interacted adeptly with allies such as Winston Churchill, Field Marshal Bernard Montgomery and General Charles de Gaulle. He had serious disagreements with Churchill and Montgomery over questions of strategy, but these rarely upset his relationships with them. He dealt with Soviet Marshal Zhukov, his Russian counterpart, and they became good friends.

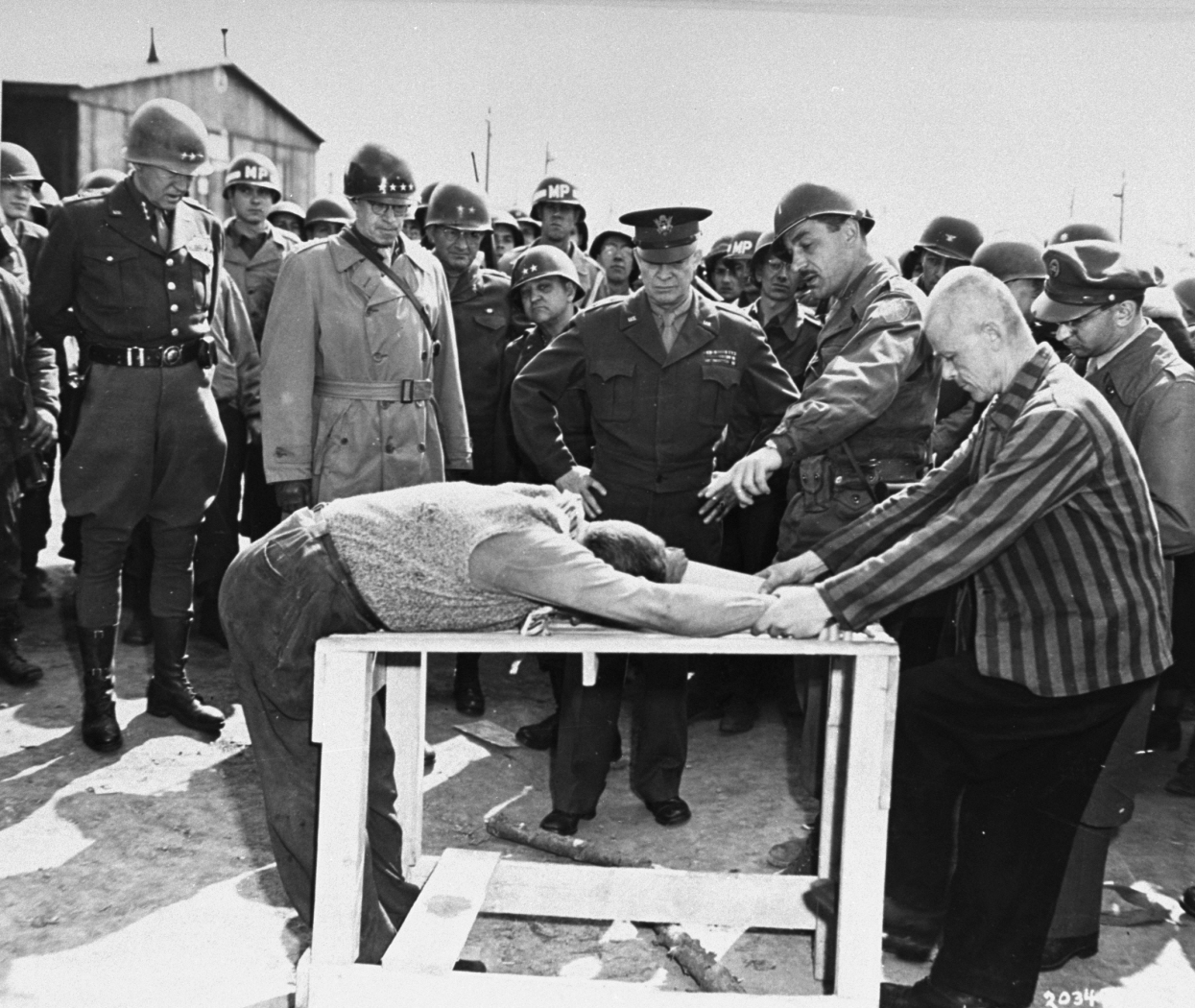
Survivors of the Ohrdruf concentration camp demonstrate torture methods used in the camp

In December 1944, the Germans launched a surprise counteroffensive, the Battle of the Bulge, which the Allies successfully repelled in early 1945 after Eisenhower repositioned his armies and improved weather allowed the Army Air Force to engage. German defenses continued to deteriorate on both the Eastern Front with the Red Army and the Western Front with the Western Allies. The British wanted to capture Berlin, but Eisenhower decided it would be a military mistake for him to attack Berlin and said orders to that effect would have to be explicit. The British backed down but then wanted Eisenhower to move into Czechoslovakia for political reasons. Washington refused to support Churchill's plan to use Eisenhower's army for political maneuvers against Moscow. The actual division of Germany followed the lines that Roosevelt, Churchill and Stalin had previously agreed upon. The Soviet Red Army captured Berlin in a very bloody large-scale battle, and the Germans finally surrendered on May 7, 1945.

Throughout 1945, the allied armies liberated numerous Nazi concentration camps throughout Europe. As the allies learned the full extent of the Holocaust, Eisenhower anticipated that, in the future, attempts to recharacterize Nazi crimes as propaganda (Holocaust denial) would be made, and took steps against it by demanding extensive photo and film documentation of Nazi extermination camps.

== After World War II (1945–1953) ==
=== Military Governor of the American-occupied zone of Germany ===
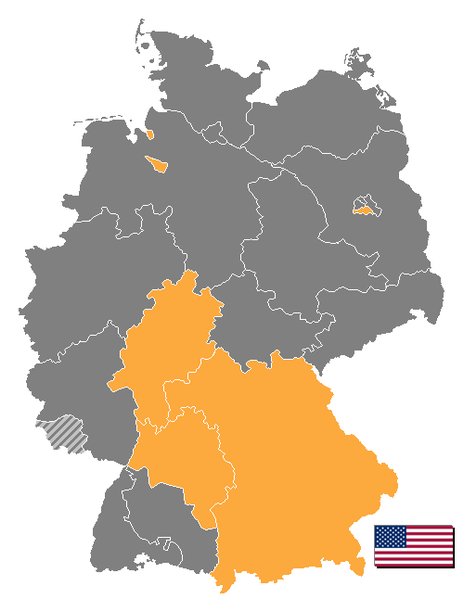
General Eisenhower served as military governor of the American zone (highlighted) in Allied-occupied Germany from May through November 1945.

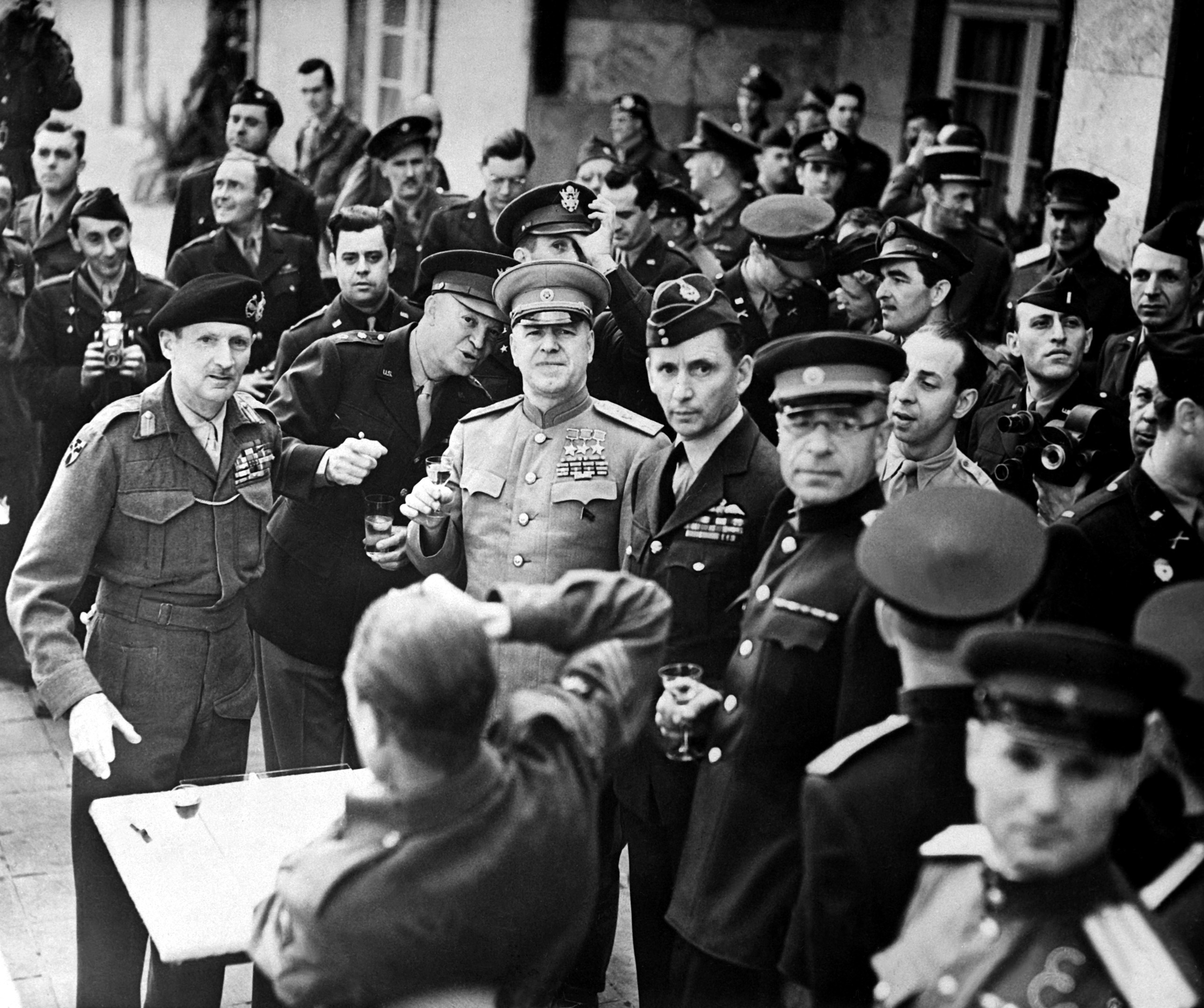
Eisenhower sharing a toast with Zhukov, Montgomery and other Allied officials, June 1945

Following the German unconditional surrender, Eisenhower was appointed military governor of the American-occupied zone of Germany, located primarily in Southern Germany, and headquartered in Frankfurt am Main. Upon discovery of the Nazi concentration camps, he ordered camera crews to document evidence for use in the Nuremberg Trials. He reclassified German prisoners of war (POWs) in US custody as Disarmed Enemy Forces (DEFs), who were no longer subject to the Geneva Convention. Eisenhower followed the orders laid down by the Joint Chiefs of Staff (JCS) in directive JCS 1067 but softened them by bringing in 400,000 tons of food for civilians and allowing more fraternization. In response to the devastation in Germany, including food shortages and an influx of refugees, he arranged distribution of American food and medical equipment. His actions reflected the new American attitudes of the German people as Nazi victims not villains, while aggressively purging the ex-Nazis.

=== Army Chief of Staff ===
Eisenhower at the Command and General Staff College at Fort Leavenworth, Kansas, with Lieutenant General Leonard T. Gerow and CMO Williams, February 14, 1946.

In November 1945, Eisenhower returned to Washington to replace Marshall as Chief of Staff of the Army, making him the first Chief of Staff in the history of the post who did not serve in the Philippine–American War. His main role was the rapid demobilization of millions of soldiers, which was delayed by lack of shipping. Eisenhower was convinced in 1946 that the Soviet Union did not want war and that friendly relations could be maintained; he strongly supported the new United Nations and favored its involvement in the control of atomic bombs. However, in formulating policies regarding the atomic bomb and relations with the Soviets, Truman was guided by the State Department and ignored Eisenhower and the Pentagon. Indeed, Eisenhower had opposed the use of the atomic bomb against the Japanese, writing, "First, the Japanese were ready to surrender and it wasn't necessary to hit them with that awful thing. Second, I hated to see our country be the first to use such a weapon." Initially, Eisenhower hoped for cooperation with the Soviets. He even visited Warsaw in 1945. Invited by Bolesław Bierut and decorated with the highest military decoration, he was shocked by the scale of destruction in the city. However, by mid-1947, as east–west tensions over economic recovery in Germany and the Greek Civil War escalated, Eisenhower agreed with a containment policy to stop Soviet expansion.

=== 1948 presidential election ===
In June 1943, a visiting politician had suggested to Eisenhower that he might become president after the war. Believing that a general should not participate in politics, Merlo J. Pusey wrote that "figuratively speaking, [Eisenhower] kicked his political-minded visitor out of his office". As others asked him about his political future, Eisenhower told one that he could not imagine wanting to be considered for any political job "from dogcatcher to Grand High Supreme King of the Universe", and another that he could not serve as Army Chief of Staff if others believed he had political ambitions. In 1945, Truman told Eisenhower during the Potsdam Conference that if desired, the president would help the general win the 1948 election, and in 1947 he offered to run as Eisenhower's running mate on the Democratic ticket if MacArthur won the Republican nomination.

As the election approached, other prominent citizens and politicians from both parties urged Eisenhower to run. In January 1948, after learning of plans in New Hampshire to elect delegates supporting him for the forthcoming Republican National Convention, Eisenhower stated through the Army that he was "not available for and could not accept nomination to high political office"; "life-long professional soldiers", he wrote, "in the absence of some obvious and overriding reason, [should] abstain from seeking high political office". Eisenhower maintained no political party affiliation during this time. Many believed he was forgoing his only opportunity to be president as Republican Thomas E. Dewey was considered the probable winner and would presumably serve two terms, meaning that Eisenhower, at age 66 in 1956, would be too old to run.

=== President at Columbia University and NATO Supreme Commander ===
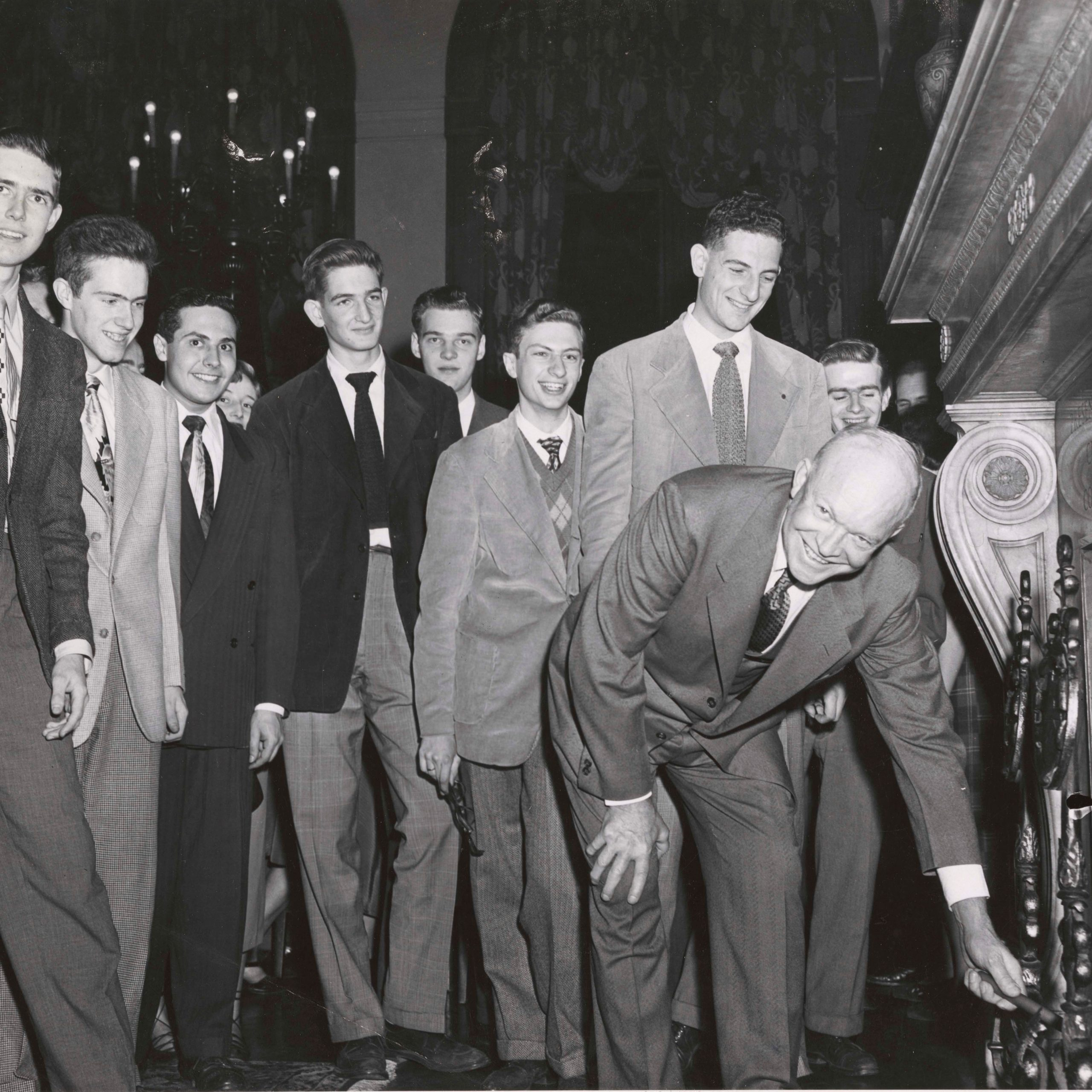
Eisenhower lighting the Columbia University Yule Log, 1949

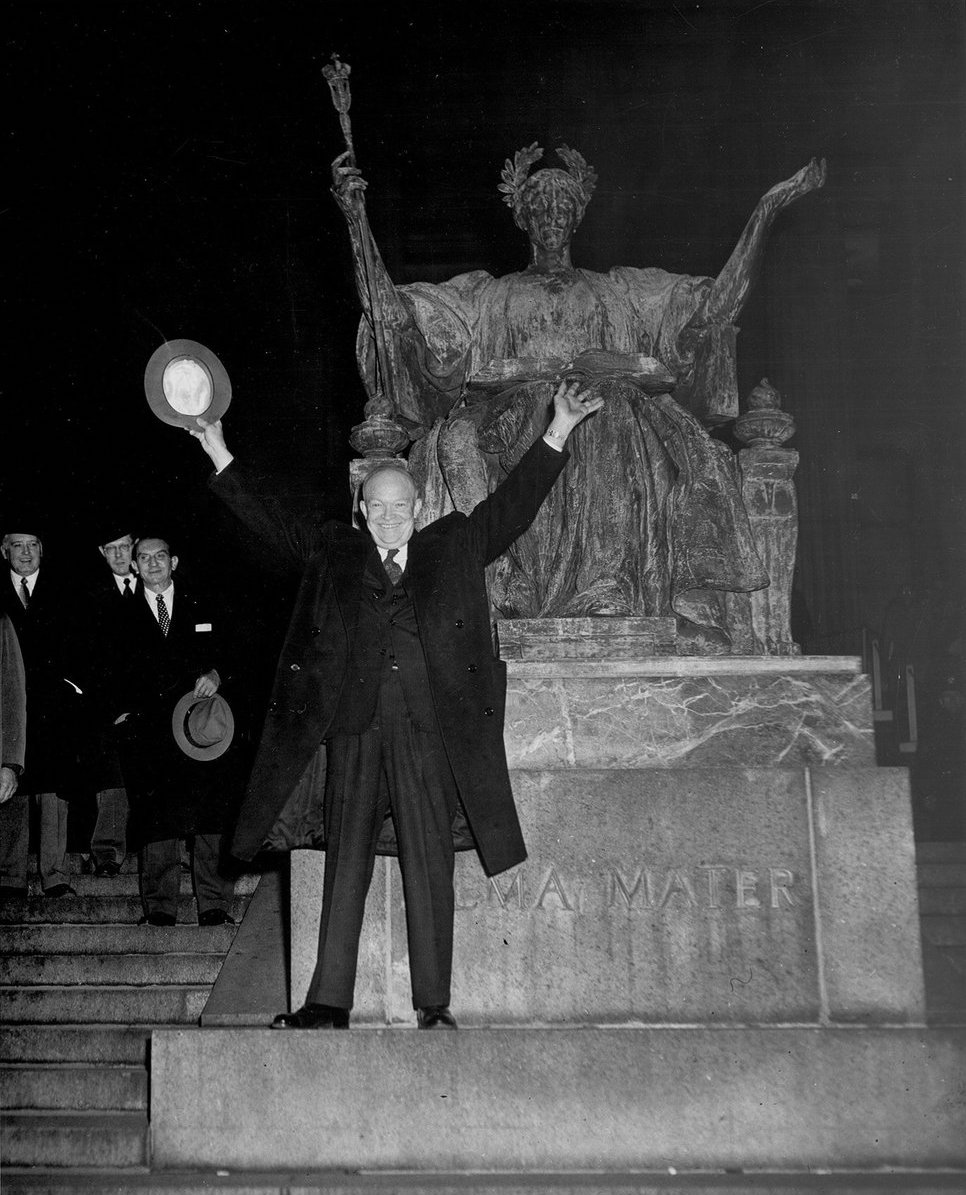
Eisenhower posing in front of Alma Mater at Columbia in 1953

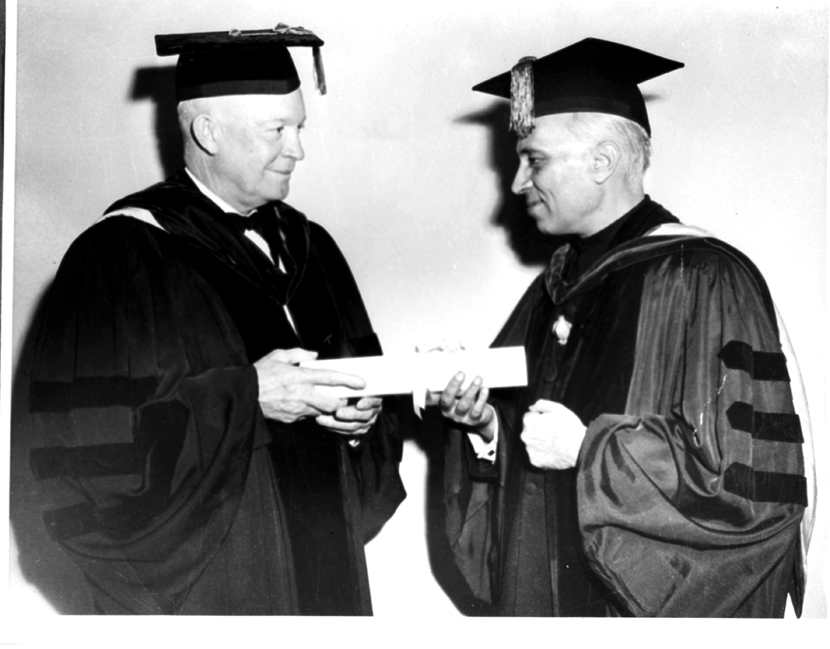
As president of Columbia, Eisenhower presents an honorary degree to Jawaharlal Nehru.

In 1948, Eisenhower became President of Columbia University, an Ivy League university in New York City, where he was inducted into Phi Beta Kappa. The choice was subsequently characterized as not having been a good fit for either party. During that year, Eisenhower's memoir, Crusade in Europe, was published. It was a major financial success. Eisenhower sought the advice of Augusta National's Roberts about the tax implications of this, and in due course Eisenhower's profit on the book was substantially aided by what author David Pietrusza calls "a ruling without precedent" by the Department of the Treasury. It held that Eisenhower was not a professional writer, but rather, marketing the lifetime asset of his experiences, and thus, he had to pay only capital gains tax on his $635,000 advance instead of the much higher personal tax rate. This ruling saved Eisenhower about $400,000.

Eisenhower's stint as the president of Columbia was punctuated by his activity within the Council on Foreign Relations, a study group he led concerning the political and military implications of the Marshall Plan and The American Assembly, Eisenhower's "vision of a great cultural center where business, professional and governmental leaders could meet from time to time to discuss and reach conclusions concerning problems of a social and political nature". His biographer Blanche Wiesen Cook suggested that this period served his "political education", since he had to prioritize wide-ranging educational, administrative, and financial demands for the university. Through his involvement in the Council on Foreign Relations, he gained exposure to economic analysis, which became the bedrock of his understanding of economic policy. "Whatever General Eisenhower knows about economics, he has learned at the study group meetings", one Aide to Europe member claimed.

Eisenhower accepted the presidency of the university to expand his ability to promote "the American form of democracy" through education. He was clear on this point to the trustees on the search committee. He informed them that his main purpose was "to promote the basic concepts of education in a democracy". As a result, he was "almost incessantly" devoted to the idea of the American Assembly, a concept he developed into an institution by the end of 1950.

Within months of becoming university president, Eisenhower was requested to advise Secretary of Defense James Forrestal on the unification of the armed services. About six months after his appointment, he became the informal Chairman of the Joint Chiefs of Staff in Washington. Two months later, he fell ill with what was diagnosed as acute gastroenteritis, and he spent over a month in recovery at the Augusta National Golf Club. He returned to his post in New York in mid-May, and in July 1949 took a two-month vacation out-of-state. Because the American Assembly had begun to take shape, he traveled around the country during summer and fall 1950, building financial support for it, including from Columbia Associates, a recently created alumni and benefactor organization for which he had helped recruit members. Eisenhower was unknowingly building resentment and a reputation among the Columbia University faculty and staff as an absentee president who was using the university for his own interests. As a career military man, he naturally had little in common with the academics. The contacts gained through university and American Assembly fundraising activities would later become important supporters in Eisenhower's bid for the Republican party nomination and the presidency. Meanwhile, Columbia University's liberal faculty members became disenchanted with the university president's ties to oilmen and businessmen.

In July 1950, Eisenhower met then California congressman Richard Nixon for the first time when both men were guests of former president Herbert Hoover at a small group lunch party at the named Cave Man Camp, part of the 2,700-acre private campground the Bohemian Grove located 70 miles north of San Francisco, with Hoover having been a member of the Bohemian club since 1913. At the lunch, Hoover gave a toast, and Eisenhower gave a short speech, followed by time spent around a campfire, with most of the conversation being about what Eisenhower had said. Nixon, reflected on Eisenhower's speech, saying: "It was not a polished speech, but he delivered it without notes, and he had the good sense not to speak too long," on the reaction of the group Nixon said: "The only line that drew significant applause was his comment that he did not see why anyone who refused to sign a loyalty oath should have the right to teach at a state university". In July 1950, Nixon, for his part, was in the middle of his successful Senate campaign. The rising political star had impressed Hoover with his political ability, especially for playing a big role in taking down Alger Hiss for committing perjury before the House Un-American Activities Committee, concerning charges of having committed espionage. Well, Eisenhower was the guest of honor; it was more his political future, more so than his respected military career or his role as president of one of the country's top universities that interested the group. Hoover, his associates and friends, who were old-guard conservatives like Hoover himself, were ostensibly more inclined to support Ohio senator Robert A. Taft in the upcoming 1952 United States presidential election, but were nonetheless interested in hearing what the potential future president had to say. At the table during lunch, Nixon sat a few seats down on the left across from Eisenhower, who sat to the right next to Hoover, who sat at the head of the table; at some point during the gathering, Eisenhower and Nixon had a brief conversation that seemed to leave little to no impact on Eisenhower as he is never known to have commented on it in later life.

He did have some successes at Columbia. Puzzled as to why no American university had undertaken the "continuous study of the causes, conduct and consequences of war", Eisenhower undertook the creation of the Institute of War and Peace Studies, a research facility to "study war as a tragic social phenomenon". Eisenhower was able to use his network of wealthy friends and acquaintances to secure initial funding for it. Under its founding director, international relations scholar William T. R. Fox, the institute began in 1951 and became a pioneer in international security studies, one that would be emulated by other institutes in the United States and Britain later in the decade. The Institute of War and Peace Studies thus became one of the projects which Eisenhower considered his "unique contribution" to Columbia. As the president of Columbia, Eisenhower gave voice to his opinions about the supremacy and difficulties of American democracy. His tenure marked his transformation from military to civilian leadership. His biographer, Travis Beal Jacobs, suggested that the alienation of the Columbia faculty contributed to sharp intellectual criticism of him for many years.

The trustees of Columbia University declined to accept Eisenhower's offer to resign in December 1950, when he took an extended leave from the university to become the Supreme Commander of the North Atlantic Treaty Organization (NATO), and he was given operational command of NATO forces in Europe. Eisenhower retired from active service as an army general on June 3, 1952, and he resumed his presidency of Columbia. Meanwhile, Eisenhower had become the Republican Party nominee for president of the United States, a contest that he won on November 4. Eisenhower tendered his resignation as university president on November 15, 1952, effective January 19, 1953, the day before his inauguration.

At home, Eisenhower was more effective in making the case for NATO in Congress than the Truman administration had been. By the middle of 1951, with American and European support, NATO was a genuine military power. Nevertheless, Eisenhower thought that NATO would become a truly European alliance, with the American and Canadian commitments ending after about ten years.

=== Presidential campaign of 1952 ===
Eisenhower button from the 1952 campaign

President Truman sensed a broad-based desire for an Eisenhower candidacy for president, and he again pressed him to run for the office as a Democrat in 1951. But Eisenhower voiced his disagreements with the Democrats and declared himself to be a Republican. A "Draft Eisenhower" movement in the Republican Party persuaded him to declare his candidacy in the 1952 presidential election to counter the candidacy of non-interventionist Senator Robert A. Taft. The effort was a long struggle; Eisenhower had to be convinced that political circumstances had created a genuine duty to offer himself as a candidate and that there was a mandate from the public for him to be their president. Henry Cabot Lodge Jr. and others succeeded in convincing him, and he resigned his command at NATO in June 1952 to campaign full-time.

"I Like Ike" televised campaign ad, 1952

Eisenhower defeated Taft for the nomination, having won critical delegate votes from Texas. His campaign was noted for the simple slogan "I Like Ike". It was essential to his success that Eisenhower express opposition to Roosevelt's policy at the Yalta Conference and to Truman's policies in Korea and China—matters in which he had once participated. In defeating Taft for the nomination, it became necessary for Eisenhower to appease the right-wing Old Guard of the Republican Party; his selection of Richard Nixon as the vice-president on the ticket was designed in part for that purpose. Nixon also provided a strong anti-communist reputation, as well as youth to counter Eisenhower's more advanced age.

1952 electoral vote results

Eisenhower insisted on campaigning in the South in the general election, against the advice of his campaign team, refusing to surrender the region to the Democrats. The campaign strategy was dubbed "K_{1}C_{2}" and was intended to focus on attacking the Truman administration on three failures: the Korean War, communism, and corruption.

Two controversies tested him and his staff, but they did not damage the campaign. One involved a report that Nixon had improperly received funds from a secret trust. Nixon spoke out adroitly to avoid potential damage, but the matter permanently alienated the two candidates. The second issue centered on Eisenhower's relented decision to confront the controversial methods of Joseph McCarthy on his home turf in a Wisconsin appearance. Eisenhower condemned "wickedness in government", an allusion to gay government employees who were conflated with communism during McCarthyism.

Eisenhower defeated Democratic candidate Adlai Stevenson II in a landslide, with an electoral margin of 442 to 89, marking the first Republican return to the White House in 20 years. He also brought a Republican majority in the House, by eight votes, and in the Senate, evenly divided with Vice President Nixon providing Republicans the majority.

Following his 1952 victory, Eisenhower became the oldest president-elect at age 62 since James Buchanan in 1856. He was the third commanding general of the Army to serve as president, after George Washington and Ulysses S. Grant, and the last not to have held political office prior to becoming president until Donald Trump entered office in January 2017.

=== Election of 1956 ===
1956 electoral vote results

In the United States presidential election of 1956, Eisenhower, the popular incumbent, was re-elected with an electoral margin of 457 to 73, defeating Stevenson once more. Compared to the 1952 election, Eisenhower gained Kentucky, Louisiana, and West Virginia from Stevenson, while losing Missouri. His voters were less likely to bring up his leadership record. Instead what stood out this time "was the response to personal qualities — to his sincerity, his integrity and sense of duty, his virtue as a family man, his religious devotion, and his sheer likeableness."

== Presidency (1953–1961) ==
Dwight D. Eisenhower takes the Presidential Oath of Office
Dwight D. Eisenhower taking the Presidential Oath of Office on January 20, 1953.

Truman and Eisenhower had minimal discussions about the transition of administrations due to a complete estrangement between them as a result of campaigning. Eisenhower selected Joseph M. Dodge as his budget director, then asked Herbert Brownell Jr. and Lucius D. Clay to make recommendations for his cabinet appointments. He accepted their recommendations without exception; they included John Foster Dulles and George M. Humphrey with whom he developed his closest relationships, as well as Oveta Culp Hobby. His cabinet consisted of several corporate executives and one labor leader, and one journalist dubbed it "eight millionaires and a plumber". The cabinet was known for its lack of personal friends, office seekers, or experienced government administrators. He also upgraded the role of the National Security Council in planning all phases of the Cold War.

Before his inauguration, Eisenhower led a meeting of advisors at Pearl Harbor where they set goals for his first term: balance the budget, end the Korean War, defend vital interests at lower cost through nuclear deterrent, and end price and wage controls. He also conducted the first pre-inaugural cabinet meeting in history in late 1952; he used this meeting to articulate his anti-communist Russia policy. His inaugural address was exclusively devoted to foreign policy and included this same philosophy as well as a commitment to foreign trade and the United Nations.

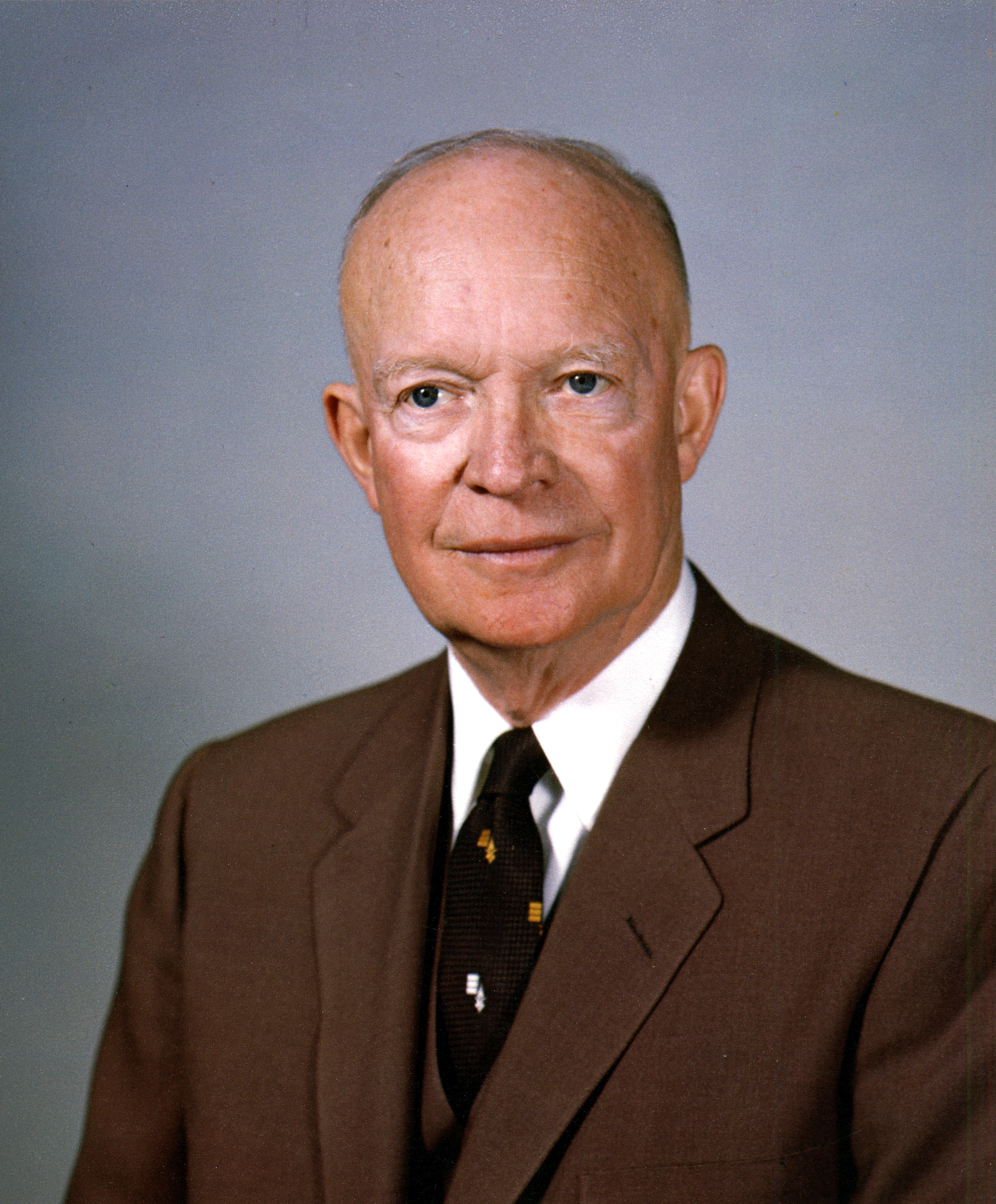
February 1959 White House portrait

Eisenhower made greater use of press conferences than any previous president, holding almost 200 over his two terms. He saw the benefit of maintaining a good relationship with the press, and he saw value in them as a means of direct communication with the American people.

Throughout his presidency, Eisenhower adhered to a political philosophy of dynamic conservatism. He described himself as a "progressive conservative" or a "dynamic conservative", and used terms such as "progressive moderate" to describe his approach. He continued all the major New Deal programs still in operation, especially Social Security. He expanded its programs and rolled them into the new Cabinet-level agency of the Department of Health, Education and Welfare, while extending benefits to an additional ten million workers. He implemented racial integration in the Armed Services in two years, which had not been completed under Truman.

In a private letter, Eisenhower wrote:

Should any party attempt to abolish social security and eliminate labor laws and farm programs, you would not hear of that party again in our political history. There is a tiny splinter group of course, that believes you can do these things [...] Their number is negligible and they are stupid.

When the 1954 Congressional elections approached, it became evident that the Republicans were in danger of losing their thin majority in both houses. Eisenhower was among those who blamed the Old Guard for the losses, and he took up the charge to stop suspected efforts by the right wing to take control of the GOP. He then articulated his position as a moderate, progressive Republican: "I have just one purpose ... and that is to build up a strong progressive Republican Party in this country. If the right wing wants a fight, they are going to get it ... before I end up, either this Republican Party will reflect progressivism or I won't be with them anymore."

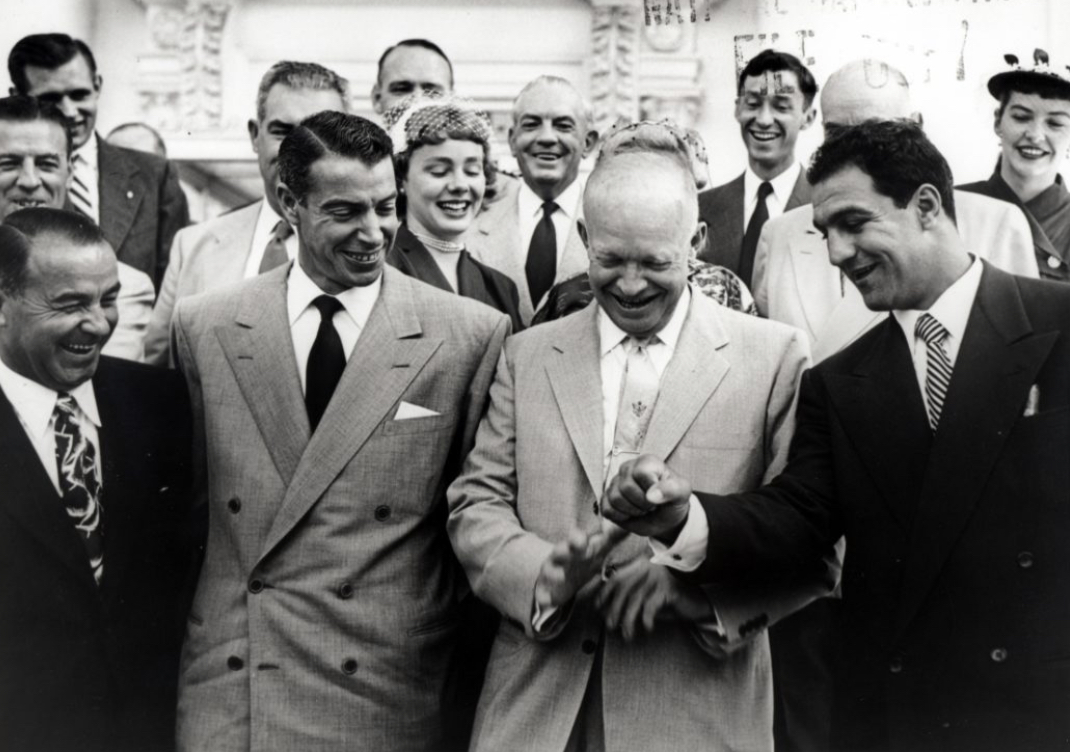
Eisenhower with heavywight champion Rocky Marciano and World Series champion Joe Dimaggio in 1953

Eisenhower initially planned on serving only one term, but he remained flexible in case leading Republicans wanted him to run again. He was recovering from a heart attack late in September 1955 when he met with his closest advisors to evaluate the GOP's potential candidates; the group concluded that a second term was well advised, and he announced that he would run again in February 1956. Eisenhower was publicly noncommittal about having Nixon as the Vice President on his ticket; the question was an especially important one in light of his heart condition. He personally favored Robert B. Anderson, a Democrat who rejected his offer, so Eisenhower resolved to leave the matter in the hands of the party, which chose Nixon nearly unanimously. In 1956, Eisenhower faced Adlai Stevenson again and won by an even larger landslide, with 457 of 531 electoral votes and 57.6 percent of the popular vote. His campaigning was curtailed by health considerations.

Eisenhower made full use of his valet, chauffeur, and secretarial support; he rarely drove or even dialed a phone number. He was an avid fisherman, golfer, painter, and bridge player. On August 26, 1959, he became the first president to travel on a jet plane when he flew aboard the VC-137A aircraft that would be designated as Air Force One and which replaced the Columbine as the presidential aircraft.

=== Atoms for Peace ===
Eisenhower gave the Atoms for Peace speech to the United Nations General Assembly on December 8, 1953, advocating for constructive use of nuclear fission for electrical energy and nuclear medicine instead of nuclear arms race proliferation. The speech led to the Atomic Energy Act of 1954 which allowed the civilian world to develop nuclear fission technology for peaceful and prosperous purposes.

=== Interstate Highway System ===
Remarks in Cadillac Square, Detroit
President Eisenhower delivered remarks about the need for a new highway program at Cadillac Square in Detroit on October 29, 1954
Text of speech excerpt

Eisenhower championed and signed the bill that authorized the Interstate Highway System in 1956. He justified the project through the Federal Aid Highway Act of 1956 as essential to American security during the Cold War.

Eisenhower's goal to create improved highways was influenced by his involvement in the Army's 1919 Transcontinental Motor Convoy. He was assigned as an observer for the mission, which involved sending a convoy of Army vehicles coast to coast. His subsequent experience with the German autobahn convinced him of the benefits of an Interstate Highway System. The system could also be used as a runway for airplanes, which would be beneficial to war efforts. Franklin D. Roosevelt put this system into place with the Federal-Aid Highway Act of 1944. He thought that an interstate highway system would be beneficial for military operations and would support continued economic growth. The legislation initially stalled in Congress over the issuance of bonds to finance the project, but the legislative effort was renewed and Eisenhower signed the law in June 1956.

=== Advanced Research Projects Agency ===
The Advanced Research Projects Agency (ARPA) was put together by Eisenhower and his Science Advisory Committee in early 1958 in response to the successful launch of the first orbital satellite from the Soviet Union, Sputnik 1. ARPA eventually created the ARPANET, which was a predecessor to the internet.

=== Foreign policy ===
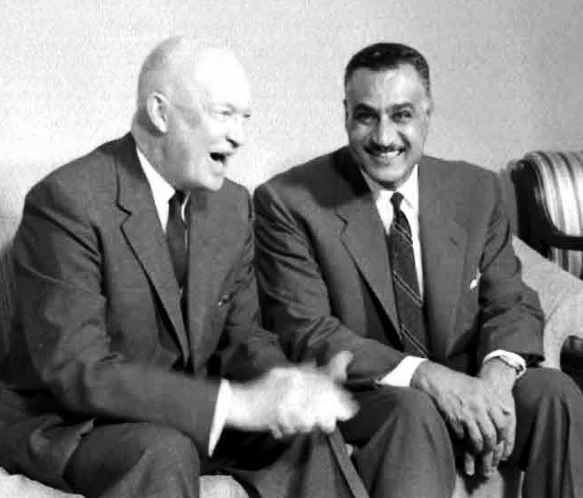
Eisenhower with Egyptian President Gamal Abdel Nasser during Nasser's visit to the United Nations in New York, September 1960

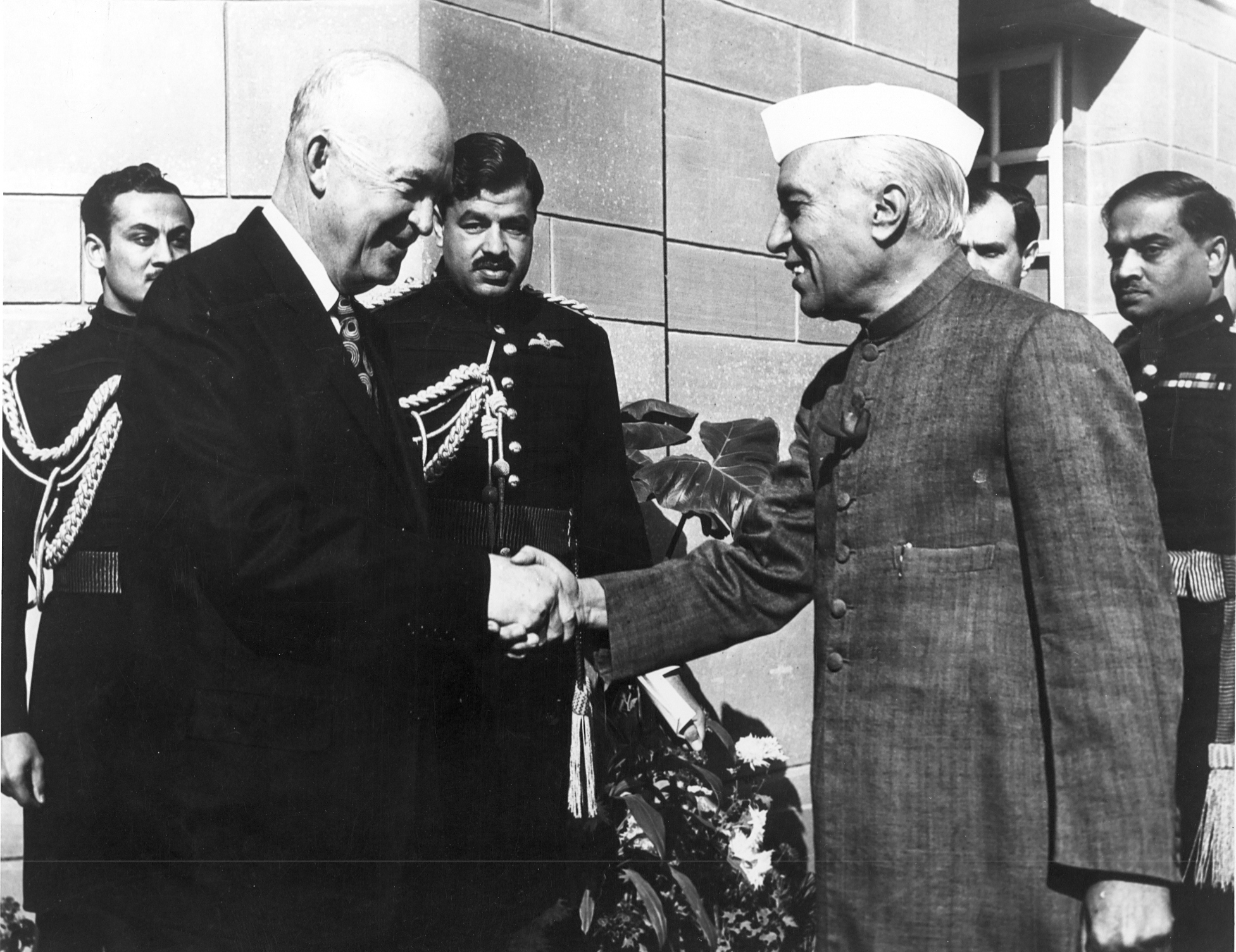
Eisenhower with Indian Prime Minister Jawaharlal Nehru

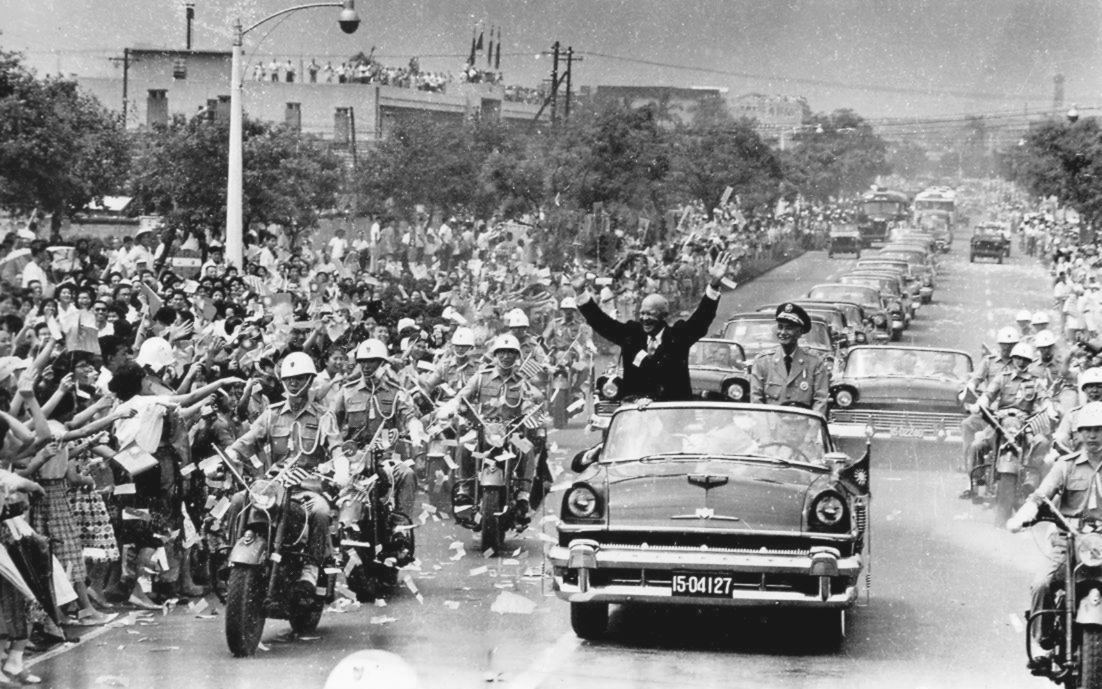
Eisenhower visits the Republic of China and its President Chiang Kai-shek in Taipei.

The United States foreign policy of the Dwight D. Eisenhower administration, from 1953 to 1961, focused on the Cold War with the Soviet Union and its satellites. The United States built up a stockpile of nuclear weapons and nuclear delivery systems to deter military threats and save money while cutting back on expensive Army combat units. A major uprising broke out in Hungary in 1956; the Eisenhower administration did not become directly involved, but condemned the military invasion by the Soviet Union. Eisenhower sought to reach a nuclear test ban treaty with the Soviet Union, but following the 1960 U-2 incident the Kremlin canceled a scheduled summit in Paris.

As he promised, Eisenhower quickly ended the fighting in Korea, leaving it divided North and South. The U.S. has kept major forces there ever since to deter North Korea. In 1954, he played a key role in the Senate's defeat of the Bricker Amendment, which would have limited the president's treaty making power and ability to enter into executive agreements with foreign leaders. The Eisenhower administration used propaganda and covert action extensively, and the Central Intelligence Agency (CIA) supported two military coups: the 1953 Iranian coup d'état and the 1954 Guatemalan coup d'état. The administration did not approve the partition of Vietnam at the 1954 Geneva Conference, and directed economic and military aid and advice to South Vietnam. Washington led the establishment of the Southeast Asia Treaty Organization as an alliance of anti-Communist states in Southeast Asia. It ended two crises with China over Taiwan.

In 1956, Egyptian President Gamal Abdel Nasser nationalized the Suez Canal, sparking the Suez Crisis, in which a coalition of France, Britain, and Israel attacked Egypt. Concerned about the economic and political impacts of the invasion, Eisenhower had warned the three against any such action. When they invaded anyway he used heavy financial and diplomatic pressures to force a withdrawal. In the aftermath of the crisis, Eisenhower announced the Eisenhower Doctrine, under which any country in the Middle East could request American economic assistance or aid from American military forces.

The Cuban Revolution broke out during Eisenhower's second term, resulting in the replacement of pro-U.S. military dictator Fulgencio Batista with Fidel Castro. In response to the revolution, the Eisenhower administration broke ties with Cuba and Eisenhower approved a CIA operation to carry out a campaign of terrorist attacks and sabotage, kill civilians, and cause economic damage. The CIA also trained and commanded pilots to bomb civilian airfields. The CIA began preparations for an invasion of Cuba by Cuban expatriates, ultimately resulting in the failed Bay of Pigs Invasion after Eisenhower left office.

==== Space Race ====
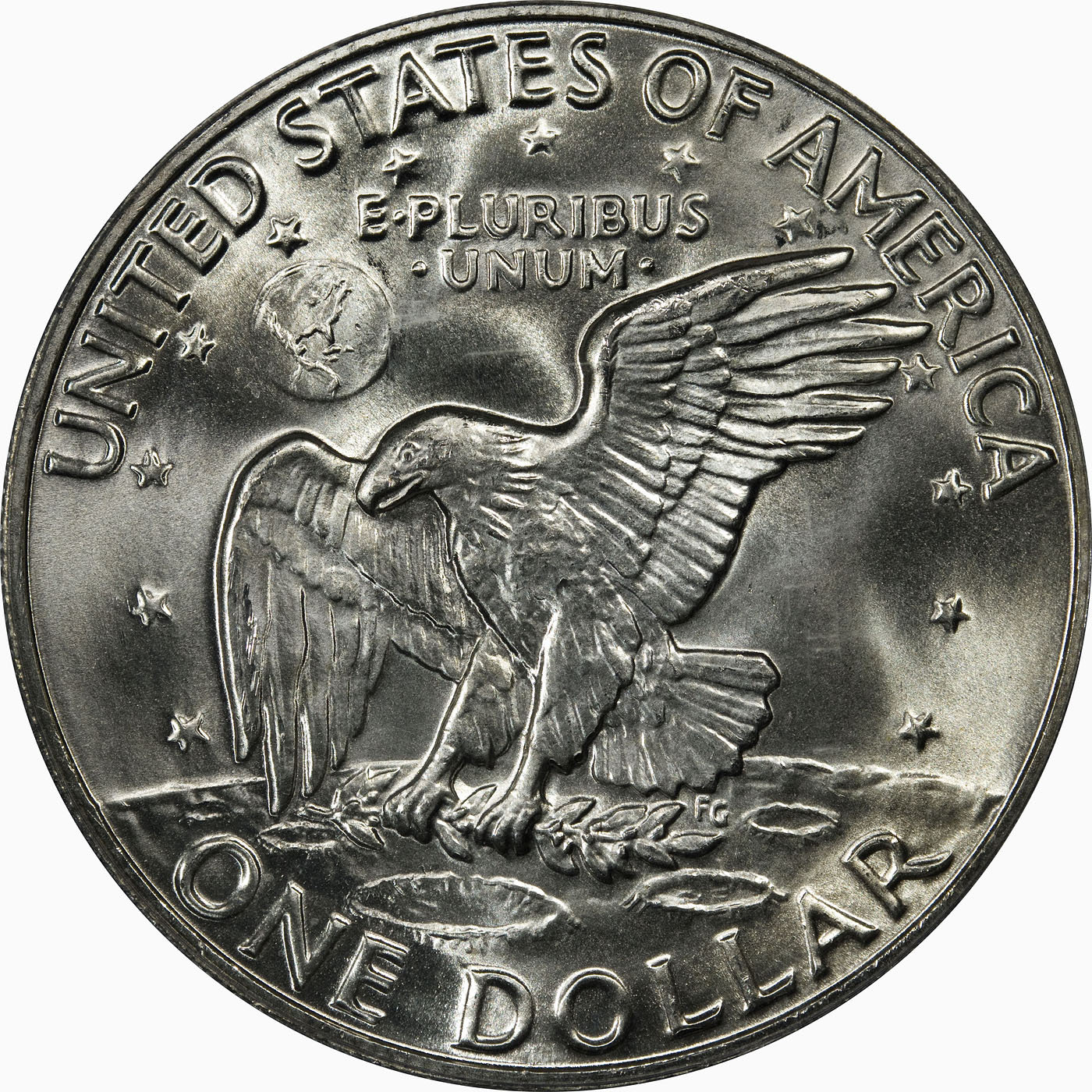
In the 1970s, the reverse of the Eisenhower dollar celebrated America's Moon landings, which began 11 years after NASA was created during Eisenhower's presidency.

Eisenhower and the CIA had known since at least January 1957, nine months before Sputnik, that Russia had the capability to launch a small payload into orbit and was likely to do so within a year.

Eisenhower's support of the nation's fledgling space program was officially modest until the Soviet launch of Sputnik in 1957, gaining the Cold War enemy enormous prestige. He then launched a national campaign that funded not just space exploration but a major strengthening of science and higher education. The Eisenhower administration determined to adopt a non-aggressive policy that would allow "space-crafts of any state to overfly all states, a region free of military posturing and launch Earth satellites to explore space". His Open Skies Policy attempted to legitimize illegal Lockheed U-2 flyovers and Project Genetrix while paving the way for spy satellite technology to orbit over sovereign territory, but Nikolai Bulganin and Nikita Khrushchev declined Eisenhower's proposal at the Geneva conference in July 1955. In response to Sputnik being launched in October 1957, Eisenhower created NASA as a civilian space agency in October 1958, signed a landmark science education law, and improved relations with American scientists.

Fear spread through the United States that the Soviet Union would invade and spread communism, so Eisenhower wanted to not only create a surveillance satellite to detect any threats but ballistic missiles that would protect the United States. In strategic terms, it was Eisenhower who devised the American basic strategy of nuclear deterrence based upon the triad of strategic bombers, land-based intercontinental ballistic missiles (ICBMs), and submarine-launched ballistic missiles (SLBMs).

NASA planners projected that human spaceflight would pull the United States ahead in the Space Race; however, in 1960, an Ad Hoc Panel on Man-in-Space concluded that "man-in-space can not be justified" and was too costly. Eisenhower later resented the space program and its gargantuan price tag—he was quoted as saying, "Anyone who would spend $40 billion in a race to the moon for national prestige is nuts."

==== Korean War, Free China and Red China ====
In late 1952, Eisenhower went to Korea and discovered a military and political stalemate. Once in office, when the Chinese People's Volunteer Army began a buildup in the Kaesong sanctuary, he considered using nuclear weapons if an armistice was not reached. Whether China was informed of the potential for nuclear force is unknown. His earlier military reputation in Europe was effective with the Chinese communists. The National Security Council, the Joint Chiefs of Staff, and the Strategic Air Command (SAC) devised detailed plans for nuclear war against Red China. With the death of Stalin in March 1953, Russian support for a Chinese communist hard-line weakened and China decided to compromise on the prisoner issue.

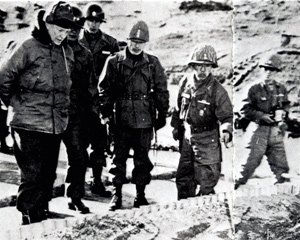
Eisenhower in Korea with General Chung Il-kwon, and Baik Seon-yup, 1952

In July 1953, an armistice took effect with Korea divided along approximately the same boundary as in 1950. The armistice and boundary remain in effect today. The armistice, which concluded despite opposition from Secretary Dulles, South Korean President Syngman Rhee, and also within Eisenhower's party, has been described by biographer Stephen E. Ambrose as the greatest achievement of the administration. Eisenhower had the insight to realize that unlimited war in the nuclear age was unthinkable, and limited war unwinnable.

A point of emphasis in Eisenhower's campaign had been his endorsement of a policy of liberation from communism as opposed to a policy of containment. This remained his preference despite the armistice with Korea. Throughout his terms Eisenhower took a hard-line attitude toward China, as demanded by conservative Republicans, with the goal of driving a wedge between China and the Soviet Union. Eisenhower continued Truman's policy of recognizing the Republic of China (Taiwan) as the legitimate government of China, not the Peking (Beijing) regime. There were localized flare-ups when the People's Liberation Army began shelling the islands of Quemoy and Matsu in September 1954. Eisenhower received recommendations embracing every variation of response; he thought it essential to have every possible option available to him as the crisis unfolded.

The Sino-American Mutual Defense Treaty with the Republic of China was signed in December 1954. He requested and secured from Congress their "Free China Resolution" in January 1955, which gave Eisenhower unprecedented power in advance to use military force at any level in defense of Free China and the Pescadores. The Resolution bolstered the morale of the Chinese nationalists and signaled to Beijing that the US was committed to holding the line.

During the First Taiwan Strait crisis, Eisenhower threatened to use nuclear weapons against PRC military targets in Fujian. These threats prompted Mao Zedong to launch China's nuclear weapons program. He authorized a series of bomb tests labeled Operation Teapot. Nevertheless, he left the Chinese communists guessing as to the exact nature of his nuclear response. This allowed Eisenhower to accomplish all of his objectives—the end of this communist encroachment, the retention of the Islands by the Chinese nationalists and continued peace. Defense of the Republic of China from an invasion remains a core American policy.

China invited some American reporters to China in 1956, having previously ousted American reporters after the PRC's founding. Eisenhower upheld the US ban on travel to China. US newspapers, including The New York Times and The Washington Post criticized the Eisenhower's administration decision as antithetical to the free press.

==== Southeast Asia ====
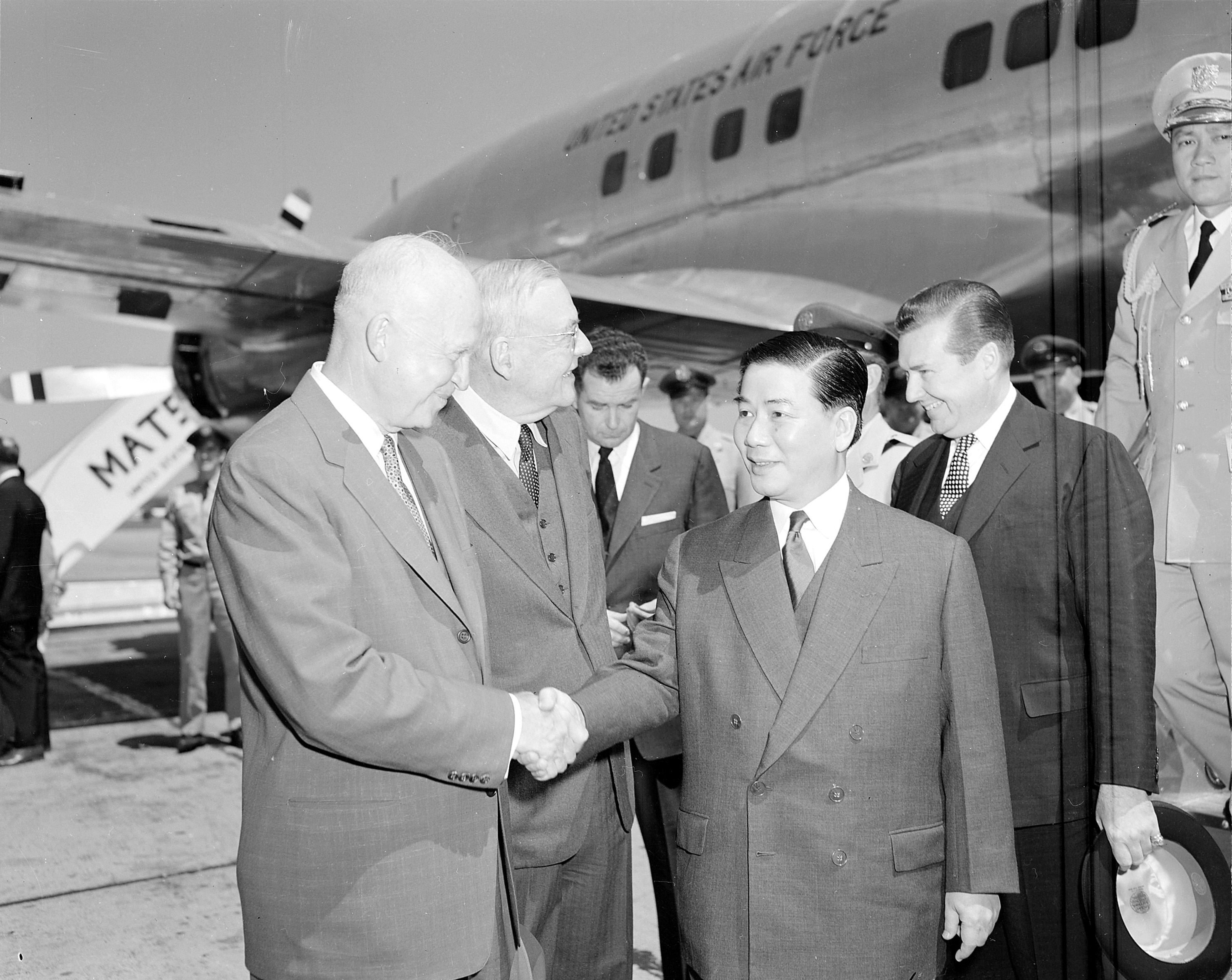
Eisenhower and Secretary of State John Foster Dulles with South Vietnamese President Ngo Dinh Diem, May 1957

Early in 1953, the French asked Eisenhower for help in French Indochina against the Communists, supplied from China, who were fighting the First Indochina War. Eisenhower sent Lt. General John W. O'Daniel to Vietnam to assess the French forces there. Chief of Staff Matthew Ridgway dissuaded the President from intervening by presenting a comprehensive estimate of the massive military deployment that would be necessary. Eisenhower stated prophetically that "this war would absorb our troops by divisions."

Eisenhower did provide France with bombers and non-combat personnel. After a few months with no success by the French, he added other aircraft to drop napalm for clearing purposes. Further requests for assistance from the French were agreed to but only on conditions Eisenhower knew were impossible to meet – allied participation and congressional approval. For many Americans, the French appeared to be militarily unreliable in both Europe and Asia. In April 1954, Secretary of State John Foster Dulles stressed the "extreme importance" of getting the French to sign a treaty granting full independence to the State of Vietnam, as the US would only support "an authentic Vietnamese nationalist government".

When the French fortress of Dien Bien Phu fell to the Vietnamese Communists in May 1954, Eisenhower refused to intervene despite urging from the Chairman of the Joint Chiefs, the Vice President and the head of NCS. He responded to the French defeat with the formation of the SEATO (Southeast Asia Treaty Organization) Alliance with the UK, France, New Zealand and Australia in defense of Vietnam against communism. At that time the French and Chinese reconvened the Geneva peace talks; Eisenhower agreed the US would participate only as an observer. After France and the Communists agreed to a partition of Vietnam, Eisenhower rejected the agreement, offering military and economic aid to South Vietnam. Ambrose argues that Eisenhower, by not participating in the Geneva agreement, had kept the US out of Vietnam; nevertheless, with the formation of SEATO, he had put the US back into the conflict.

In late 1954, Gen. J. Lawton Collins was made ambassador to the State of Vietnam, effectively elevating the country to sovereign status. Collins' instructions were to support the leader Ngo Dinh Diem in countering communism, by helping him to build an army and wage a military campaign. Although Diem was publicly supported, in private John Foster Dulles acknowledged that Diem had been accepted because "we knew of no one better". In February 1955, Eisenhower dispatched the first American soldiers to Vietnam as military advisors to Diem's army. After Diem announced the formation of the Republic of Vietnam (commonly known as South Vietnam) in October, Eisenhower immediately recognized the new state and offered military, economic, and technical assistance.

In the years that followed, Eisenhower increased the number of US military advisors in South Vietnam to 900. This was due to North Vietnam's support of "uprisings" in the South and concern the nation would fall. In May 1957 Diem, then President of South Vietnam, made a state visit to the United States. Eisenhower pledged his continued support, and a parade was held in Diem's honor in New York City.

After the election of November 1960, Eisenhower, in a briefing with John F. Kennedy, pointed out the communist threat in Southeast Asia as requiring prioritization in the next administration. Eisenhower told Kennedy he considered Laos "the cork in the bottle" with regard to the regional threat.

==== Legitimation of Francoist Spain ====
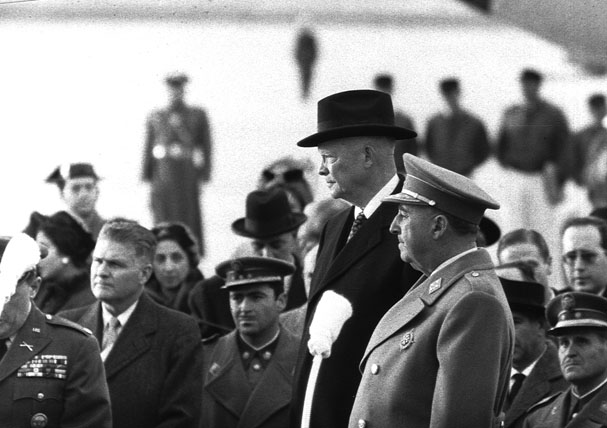
Spanish dictator Francisco Franco and Eisenhower in Madrid in 1959

The Pact of Madrid, signed on September 23, 1953, by Francoist Spain and the United States, was a significant effort to break international isolation of Spain, together with the Concordat of 1953. This development came at a time when other victorious Allies and much of the rest of the world remained hostile (Note: For the 1946 United Nations condemnation of the Francoist regime, see "Spanish Question") to a fascist regime sympathetic to the cause of the former Axis powers and established with Nazi assistance. This accord took the form of three separate executive agreements that pledged the United States to furnish economic and military aid to Spain.

==== Middle East and Eisenhower doctrine ====
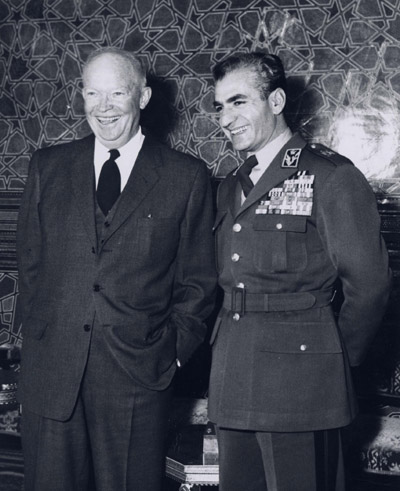
Eisenhower with the Shah of Iran, Mohammad Reza Pahlavi (1959)

Even before he was inaugurated, Eisenhower accepted a request from the British government to restore the Shah of Iran (Mohammad Reza Pahlavi) to power. He therefore authorized the CIA to overthrow Prime Minister Mohammad Mosaddegh. This resulted in increased strategic control over Iranian oil by American and British companies.

In November 1956, Eisenhower forced an end to the combined British, French and Israeli invasion of Egypt in response to the Suez Crisis, receiving praise from Egyptian president Gamal Abdel Nasser. Simultaneously, he condemned the brutal Soviet invasion of Hungary in response to the Hungarian Revolution of 1956. He publicly disavowed his allies at the United Nations and used financial and diplomatic pressure to make them withdraw from Egypt. Eisenhower explicitly defended his strong position against Britain and France in his memoirs, published in 1965.

After the Suez Crisis, the United States became the protector of unstable friendly governments in the Middle East via the "Eisenhower Doctrine". Designed by Secretary of State Dulles, it held the US would be "prepared to use armed force ... [to counter] aggression from any country controlled by international communism". Further, the US would provide economic and military aid and, if necessary, use military force to stop the spread of communism in the Middle East.

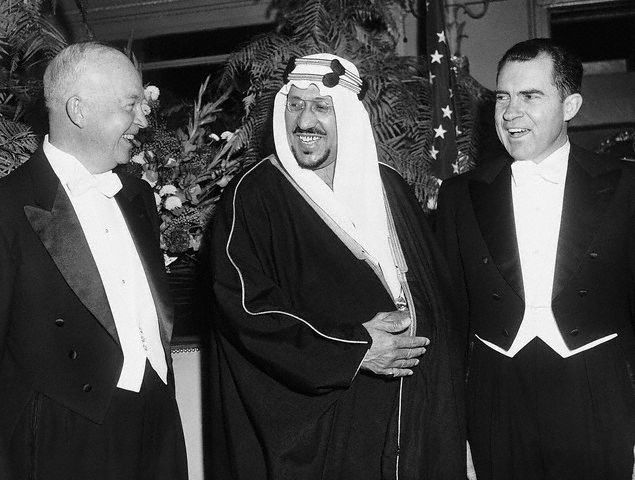
Eisenhower and Vice President Richard Nixon with King Saud of Saudi Arabia at the Mayflower Hotel in 1957

Eisenhower applied the doctrine in 1957–1958 by dispensing economic aid to Jordan, and by encouraging Syria's neighbors to consider military operations against it. More dramatically, in July 1958, he sent 15,000 Marines and soldiers to Lebanon as part of Operation Blue Bat, a non-combat peacekeeping mission to stabilize the pro-Western government and to prevent a radical revolution. The Marines departed three months later. Washington considered the military intervention successful since it brought about regional stability, weakened Soviet influence, and intimidated the Egyptian and Syrian governments, whose anti-West political position had hardened after the Suez Crisis.

Most Arab countries were skeptical about the "Eisenhower doctrine" because they considered "Zionist imperialism" the real danger. However, they did take the opportunity to obtain free money and weapons. Egypt and Syria, supported by the Soviet Union, openly opposed the initiative. However, Egypt received American aid until the Six-Day War in 1967.

As the Cold War deepened, Dulles sought to isolate the Soviet Union by building regional alliances against it. Critics sometimes called it "pacto-mania".

==== 1960 U-2 incident ====
On 1 May 1960, a United States U-2 spy plane, having taken off from Peshawar in Pakistan, was shot down by the Soviet Air Defence Forces in Sverdlovsk, Russia. It was conducting photographic aerial reconnaissance inside Soviet territory while being flown by American Central Intelligence Agency pilot Francis Gary Powers, as it was hit by a surface-to-air missile. Powers parachuted to the ground and was captured.

Initially, American authorities claimed the incident involved the loss of a civilian weather research aircraft operated by NASA, but were forced to admit the mission's true purpose a few days later after the Soviet government produced the captured pilot and parts of the U-2's surveillance equipment, including photographs of Soviet military bases.

The incident occurred during the tenures of American president Dwight D. Eisenhower and Soviet leader Nikita Khrushchev, around two weeks before the scheduled opening of an east–west summit in Paris, France. Khrushchev and Eisenhower had met face-to-face at Camp David in Maryland in September 1959, and the seeming thaw in US-Soviet relations had raised hopes globally for a peaceful resolution to the Cold War. The U-2 incident shattered the amiable "Spirit of Camp David" that had prevailed for eight months, prompting the cancellation of the summit in Paris and embarrassing the US on the international stage. The Pakistani government issued a formal apology to the Soviet Union for its role in the mission.

After his capture, Powers was convicted of espionage and sentenced to three years of imprisonment plus seven years of hard labour; he was released two years later, in February 1962, in a prisoner exchange for Soviet intelligence officer Rudolf Abel.

=== Civil rights ===
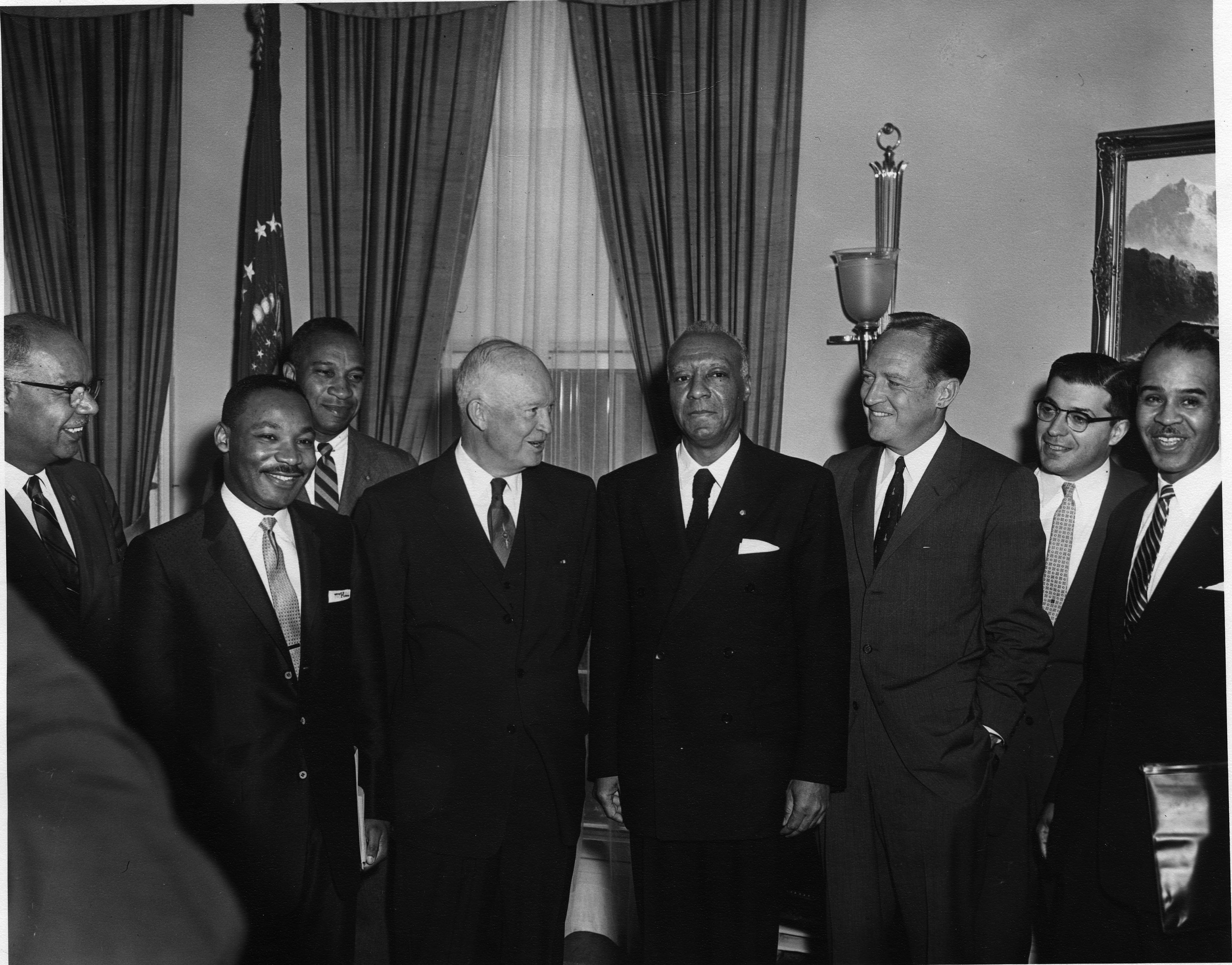
Eisenhower meets with civil rights leaders in the Oval Office, June 23, 1958 Left to right: Lester Granger, Martin Luther King Jr., E. Frederic Morrow, Eisenhower, A. Philip Randolph, William P. Rogers, Rocco Siciliano, and Roy Wilkins.

While President Truman's 1948 Executive Order 9981 had begun the process of desegregating the Armed Forces, actual implementation had been slow. Eisenhower made clear his stance in his first State of the Union address in February 1953, saying "I propose to use whatever authority exists in the office of the President to end segregation in the District of Columbia, including the Federal Government, and any segregation in the Armed Forces". When he encountered opposition from the services, he used government control of military spending to force the change through, stating "Wherever Federal Funds are expended ..., I do not see how any American can justify ... a discrimination in the expenditure of those funds". When Robert B. Anderson, Eisenhower's first Secretary of the Navy, argued that the US Navy must recognize the "customs and usages prevailing in certain geographic areas of our country which the Navy had no part in creating," Eisenhower overruled him: "We have not taken and we shall not take a single backward step. There must be no second class citizens in this country."

The administration declared racial discrimination a national security issue, as Communists around the world used the racial discrimination and history of violence in the US as a point of propaganda attack.

Eisenhower told Washington, D.C. officials to make the city a model for the rest of the country in integrating black and white public-school children. He proposed to Congress the Civil Rights Acts of 1957 and 1960 and signed those acts into law. The 1957 act for the first time established a permanent civil rights office inside the Justice Department and a Civil Rights Commission to hear testimony about abuses of voting rights. Although both acts were much weaker than subsequent civil rights legislation, they constituted the first significant civil rights acts since 1875.

In 1957, Arkansas refused to honor a federal court order to integrate their public school system stemming from the Brown decision. Eisenhower demanded that Arkansas governor Orval Faubus obey the court order. When Faubus balked, the president placed the Arkansas National Guard under federal control and sent in the 101st Airborne Division. They protected nine black students' entry to Little Rock Central High School, an all-white public school, marking the first time since the Reconstruction Era the federal government had used federal troops in the South to enforce the Constitution. Martin Luther King Jr. wrote to Eisenhower to thank him for his actions, writing "The overwhelming majority of southerners, Negro and white, stand firmly behind your resolute action to restore law and order in Little Rock".

==== Lavender Scare ====
Eisenhower's administration contributed to the anti-gay McCarthyist Lavender Scare with Eisenhower issuing Executive Order 10450 in his first year in office in 1953. The order subjected all federal employees and their friends and family to invasive in-depth investigations and interviews for the purpose of terminating the employment of (in large part) lesbian, gay, and bisexual federal employees. The indifference of Eisenhower to the extreme application of his order allowed for mass persecution of queer people within federal agencies, resulting in thousands of job losses, public outing of sexual orientation, and some suicides. During Eisenhower's two presidential terms, thousands of applicants were barred from federal employment and over 5,000 to 10,000 federal employees were fired under suspicions of being homosexual. From 1947 to 1961 the number of firings based on sexual orientation were far greater than those for membership in the Communist Party, and government officials intentionally campaigned to make "homosexual" synonymous with "Communist traitor" such that non-heterosexual people were treated as a national security threat.

=== Relations with Congress ===
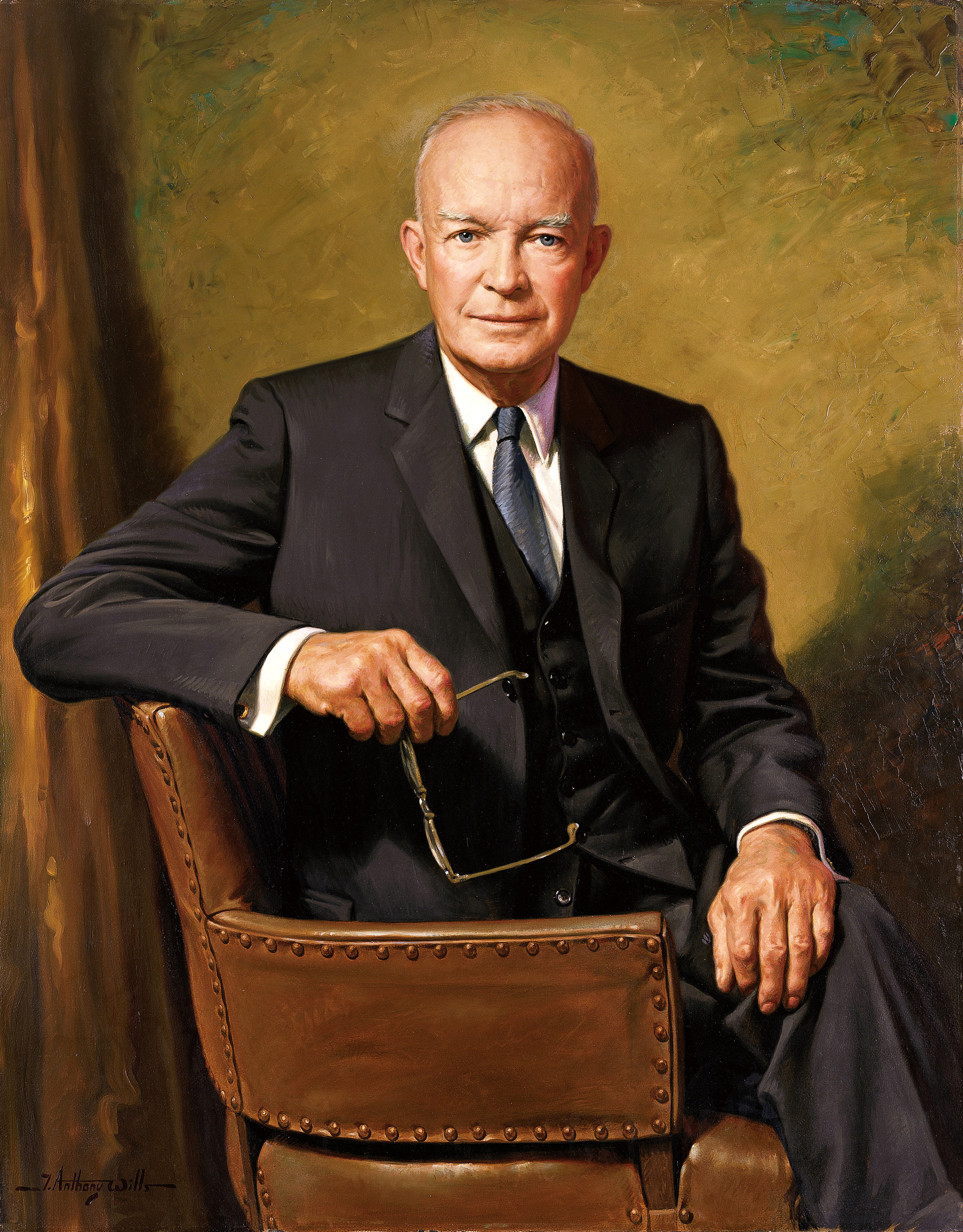
Official White House portrait of Eisenhower, c. 1960

Eisenhower had a Republican Congress for only his first two years in office; in the Senate, Republicans held the majority by a one-vote margin. Despite being Eisenhower's political opponent for the 1952 Republican presidential nomination, Senate Majority Leader Robert A. Taft assisted Eisenhower a great deal by promoting the President's proposals among the "Old Guard" Republican Senators. Taft's death in July 1953—six months into Eisenhower's presidency—affected Eisenhower both personally and professionally. The President noted he had lost "a dear friend" with Taft's passing. Eisenhower disliked Taft's successor as Majority Leader, Senator William Knowland, and the relationship between the two men led to tension between the Senate and the White House.

This prevented Eisenhower from openly condemning Joseph McCarthy's highly criticized methods against communism. To facilitate relations with Congress, Eisenhower decided to ignore McCarthy's controversies and thereby deprive them of more energy from the involvement of the White House. This position drew criticism from a number of corners. In late 1953, McCarthy declared on national television that the employment of communists within the government was a menace and would be a pivotal issue in the 1954 Senate elections. Eisenhower was urged to respond directly and specify the various measures he had taken to purge the government of communists.

Among Eisenhower's objectives in not directly confronting McCarthy was to prevent him from subjecting the Atomic Energy Commission (AEC) to his investigations, which might interfere with the AEC's work on hydrogen bombs and other weapons programs. In December 1953, Eisenhower learned that nuclear scientist J. Robert Oppenheimer had been accused of being a spy for the Soviet Union. Although Eisenhower never really believed these allegations, in January 1954 he ordered that "a blank wall" be placed between Oppenheimer and all defense-related activities. The Oppenheimer security hearing later that year resulted in the physicist losing his security clearance. The matter was controversial at the time and remained so in later years, with Oppenheimer achieving a certain martyrdom. The case would reflect poorly on Eisenhower, but the president had never examined it in any detail and had instead relied excessively upon the advice of his subordinates, especially that of AEC chairman Lewis Strauss. Eisenhower later suffered a major political defeat when his nomination of Strauss to be Secretary of Commerce was defeated in the Senate in 1959, in part due to Strauss's role in the Oppenheimer matter.

In May 1954, McCarthy threatened to issue subpoenas to White House personnel. Eisenhower was furious, and issued an order as follows: "It is essential to efficient and effective administration that employees of the Executive Branch be in a position to be completely candid in advising with each other on official matters ... it is not in the public interest that any of their conversations or communications, or any documents or reproductions, concerning such advice be disclosed." This was an unprecedented step by Eisenhower to protect communication beyond the confines of a cabinet meeting, and soon became a tradition known as executive privilege. Eisenhower's denial of McCarthy's access to his staff reduced McCarthy's hearings to rants about trivial matters and contributed to his ultimate downfall.

In early 1954, the Old Guard put forward a constitutional amendment, called the Bricker Amendment, which would curtail international agreements by the Chief Executive, such as the Yalta Agreements. Eisenhower opposed the measure. The Old Guard agreed with Eisenhower on the development and ownership of nuclear reactors by private enterprises, which the Democrats opposed. The President succeeded in getting legislation creating a system of licensure for nuclear plants by the AEC.

The Democrats gained a majority in both houses in the 1954 election. Eisenhower had to work with the Democratic Majority Leader Lyndon B. Johnson (later US president) in the Senate and Speaker Sam Rayburn in the House. Joe Martin, the Republican Speaker from 1947 to 1949 and again from 1953 to 1955, wrote that Eisenhower "never surrounded himself with assistants who could solve political problems with professional skill. There were exceptions, Leonard Hall, for example, who as chairman of the Republican National Committee tried to open the administration's eyes to the political facts of life, with occasional success. However, these exceptions were not enough to right the balance."

Speaker Martin concluded that Eisenhower worked too much through subordinates in dealing with Congress, with results, "often the reverse of what he has desired" because Members of Congress, "resent having some young fellow who was picked up by the White House without ever having been elected to office himself coming around and telling them 'The Chief wants this'. The administration never made use of many Republicans of consequence whose services in one form or another would have been available for the asking."

Eisenhower was relatively active with legislative vetoes, with 181 vetoes of which only two were overridden.

=== Judicial appointments ===
==== Supreme Court ====
Eisenhower appointed the following Justices to the Supreme Court of the United States:

- Earl Warren, 1953 (Chief Justice)
- John Marshall Harlan II, 1954
- William J. Brennan, 1956
- Charles Evans Whittaker, 1957
- Potter Stewart, 1958

Whittaker was unsuited for the role and retired in 1962, after Eisenhower's presidency had ended. Stewart and Harlan were conservative Republicans, while Brennan was a Democrat who became a leading voice for liberalism. In selecting a Chief Justice, Eisenhower looked for an experienced jurist who could appeal to liberals in the party as well as law-and-order conservatives, noting privately that Warren "represents the kind of political, economic, and social thinking that I believe we need on the Supreme Court ... He has a national name for integrity, uprightness, and courage that, again, I believe we need on the Court".

=== States admitted to the Union ===
Two states were admitted to the Union during Eisenhower's presidency.

- Alaska – January 3, 1959 (49th state)
- Hawaii – August 21, 1959 (50th state)

=== Health issues ===
Eisenhower began chain smoking cigarettes at West Point, often three or four packs a day. He joked that he "gave [himself] an order" to stop cold turkey in 1949. However, Evan Thomas says the true story was more complex. At first, he removed cigarettes and ashtrays, but that did not work. He told a friend:

I decided to make a game of the whole business and try to achieve a feeling of some superiority ... So I stuffed cigarettes in every pocket, put them around my office on the desk ... [and] made it a practice to offer a cigarette to anyone who came in ... while mentally reminding myself as I sat down, "I do not have to do what that poor fellow is doing."

He was the first president to release information about his health and medical records while in office, but people around him deliberately misled the public about his health. On September 24, 1955, while vacationing in Colorado, he had a serious heart attack. While Eisenhower convalesced at Fitzsimons Army Medical Center, Howard McCrum Snyder, his personal physician, misdiagnosed the symptoms as indigestion, and failed to call in help that was urgently needed. Snyder later falsified his own records to cover his blunder and to allow Eisenhower to imply that he was healthy enough to do his job.

The heart attack required six weeks' hospitalization, during which time Nixon, Dulles, and White House Chief of Staff Sherman Adams assumed administrative duties and provided communication with the president. He was treated by Paul Dudley White, a cardiologist with a national reputation, who regularly informed the press of the president's progress. Snyder recommended a second presidential term as essential to his recovery.

As a consequence of his heart attack, Eisenhower developed a left ventricular aneurysm, which caused a mild stroke during a cabinet meeting on November 25, 1957, when Eisenhower suddenly found himself unable to move his right hand or to speak. The president also suffered from Crohn's disease, which necessitated surgery for a bowel obstruction on June 9, 1956. To treat the intestinal block, surgeons bypassed about ten inches of his small intestine. His scheduled meeting with Indian Prime Minister Jawaharlal Nehru was postponed so he could recover at his farm. He was still recovering from this operation during the Suez Crisis. Eisenhower's health issues forced him to give up smoking and make some changes to his diet, but he still drank alcohol. During a visit to England on August 29, 1959, he complained of dizziness and had to have his blood pressure checked; however, his physician, Snyder, recalled that before dinner at the prime minister's manor house Chequers the next day, Eisenhower "drank several gin-and-tonics, and one or two gins on the rocks ... three or four wines with the dinner".

Eisenhower's health during the last three years of his second term in office was relatively good. After leaving the White House, he suffered several additional and ultimately crippling heart attacks. A severe heart attack in August 1965 largely ended his participation in public affairs. On December 12, 1966, his gallbladder was removed, containing 16 gallstones. After Eisenhower's death in 1969, an autopsy revealed an undiagnosed adrenal pheochromocytoma, a benign adrenalin-secreting tumor that may have made him more vulnerable to heart disease. Eisenhower had seven heart attacks from 1955 until his death.

=== End of presidency ===
The 22nd Amendment to the US Constitution, which set a two-term limit on the presidency, was ratified in 1951. Eisenhower was the first president constitutionally prevented from serving a third term.

Eisenhower was also the first outgoing president to come under the protection of the Former Presidents Act. Under the act, Eisenhower was entitled to a lifetime pension, state-provided staff and a Secret Service security detail.

In the 1960 election to choose his successor, Eisenhower endorsed Nixon over Democrat John F. Kennedy. He told friends, "I will do almost anything to avoid turning my chair and country over to Kennedy." He actively campaigned for Nixon in the final days, although he may have done Nixon some harm. When asked by reporters at the end of a televised press conference to list one of Nixon's policy ideas he had adopted, Eisenhower joked, "If you give me a week, I might think of one. I don't remember." Kennedy's campaign used the quote in one of its campaign commercials. Nixon narrowly lost to Kennedy. Eisenhower, who was, at 70, the oldest president to date, was succeeded by 43-year-old Kennedy, the youngest elected president.

It was originally intended for Eisenhower to have a more active role in the campaign as he wanted to respond to attacks Kennedy made on his administration. However, First Lady Mamie Eisenhower expressed concern to Second Lady Pat Nixon about the strain campaigning would put on his heart, and wanted the president to withdraw, without letting him know of her intervention. Vice President Nixon himself was informed by Major General Howard Snyder, the White House physician, that he could not approve a heavy campaign schedule for the president, whose health problems had been exacerbated by Kennedy's attacks. Nixon then convinced Eisenhower not to go ahead with the expanded campaign schedule and limit himself to the original schedule. Nixon reflected that if Eisenhower had carried out his expanded campaign schedule, he might have had a decisive impact on the outcome of the election, especially in states that Kennedy won with razor-thin margins. Mamie did not tell Dwight why Nixon changed his mind on Dwight's campaigning until years later.

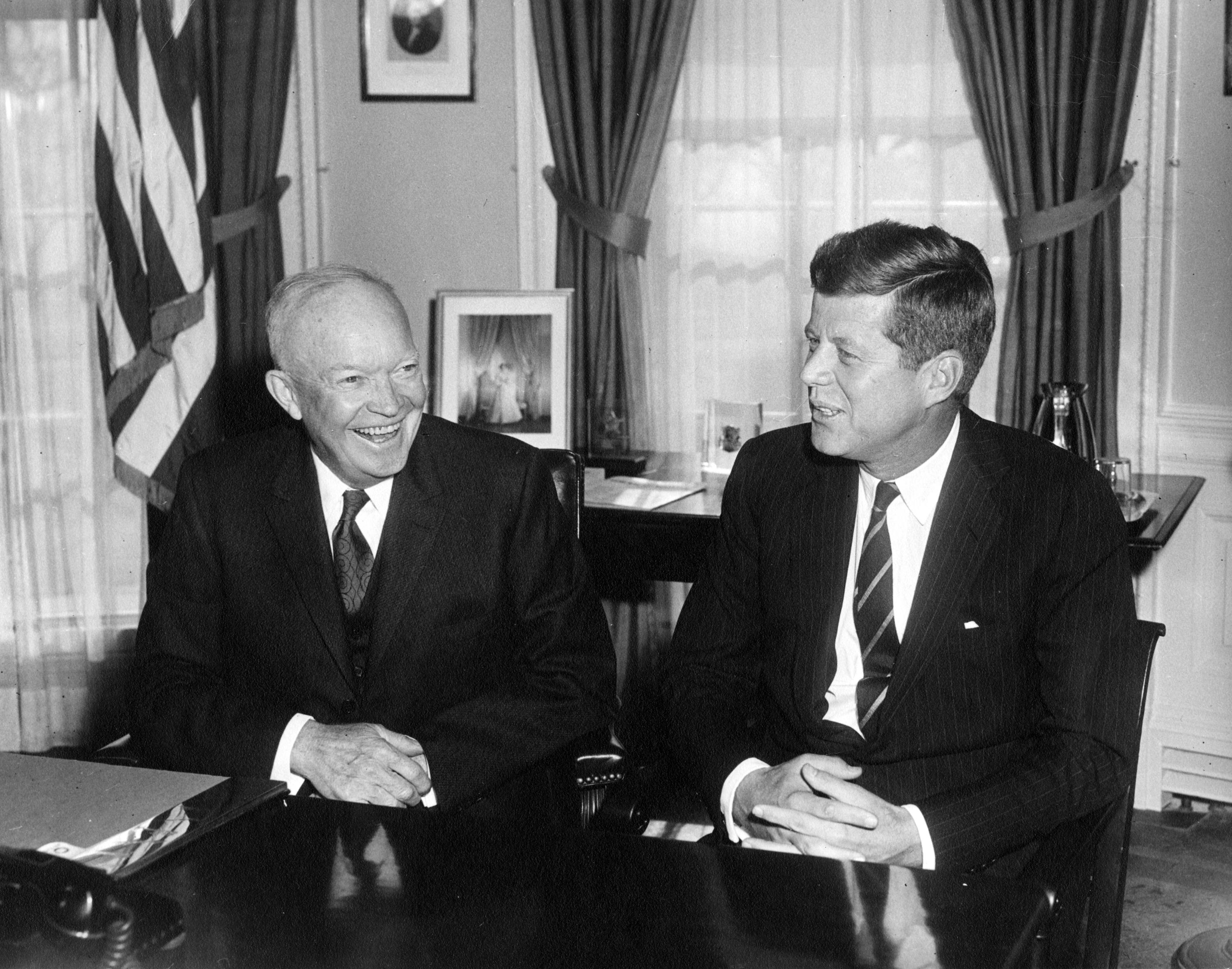
Eisenhower sharing a light moment with President-elect John F. Kennedy during their meeting in the Oval Office at White House

Eisenhower's farewell address, January 17, 1961

On January 17, 1961, Eisenhower gave his final televised Address to the Nation from the Oval Office. In his farewell speech, Eisenhower raised the issue of the Cold War and role of the armed forces. He described the Cold War: "We face a hostile ideology global in scope, atheistic in character, ruthless in purpose and insidious in method ..." and warned about what he saw as unjustified government spending proposals. He continued with a warning that "we must guard against the acquisition of unwarranted influence, whether sought or unsought, by the military–industrial complex." Eisenhower elaborated, "we recognize the imperative need for this development ... the potential for the disastrous rise of misplaced power exists and will persist ... Only an alert and knowledgeable citizenry can compel the proper meshing of the huge industrial and military machinery of defense with our peaceful methods and goals, so that security and liberty may prosper together."

Because of legal issues related to holding a military rank while in a civilian office, Eisenhower had resigned his permanent commission as General of the Army before assuming the presidency. Upon completion of his presidential term, his commission was reactivated by Congress.

== Post-presidency (1961–1969) ==
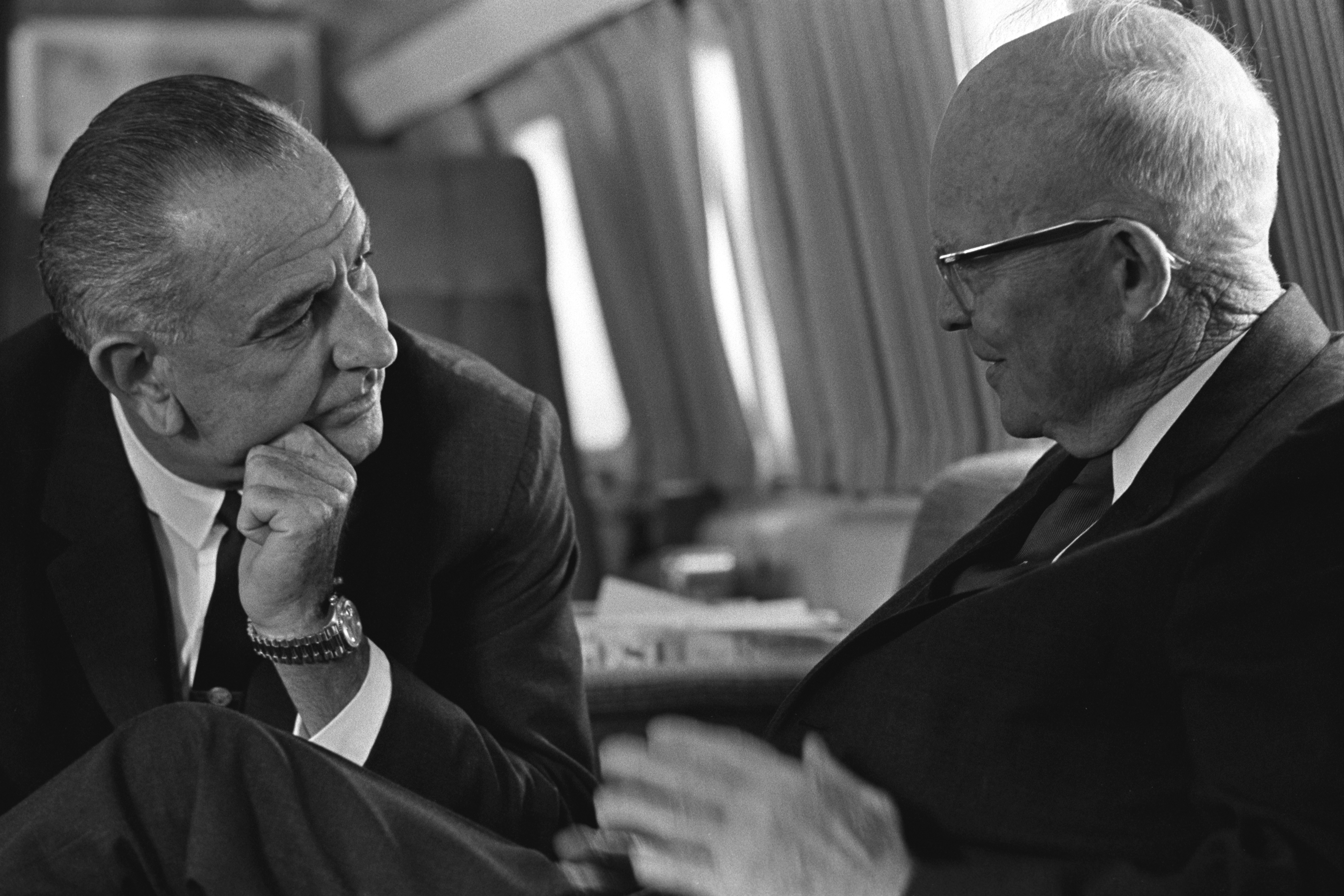
President Lyndon Johnson with Eisenhower aboard Air Force One in October 1965

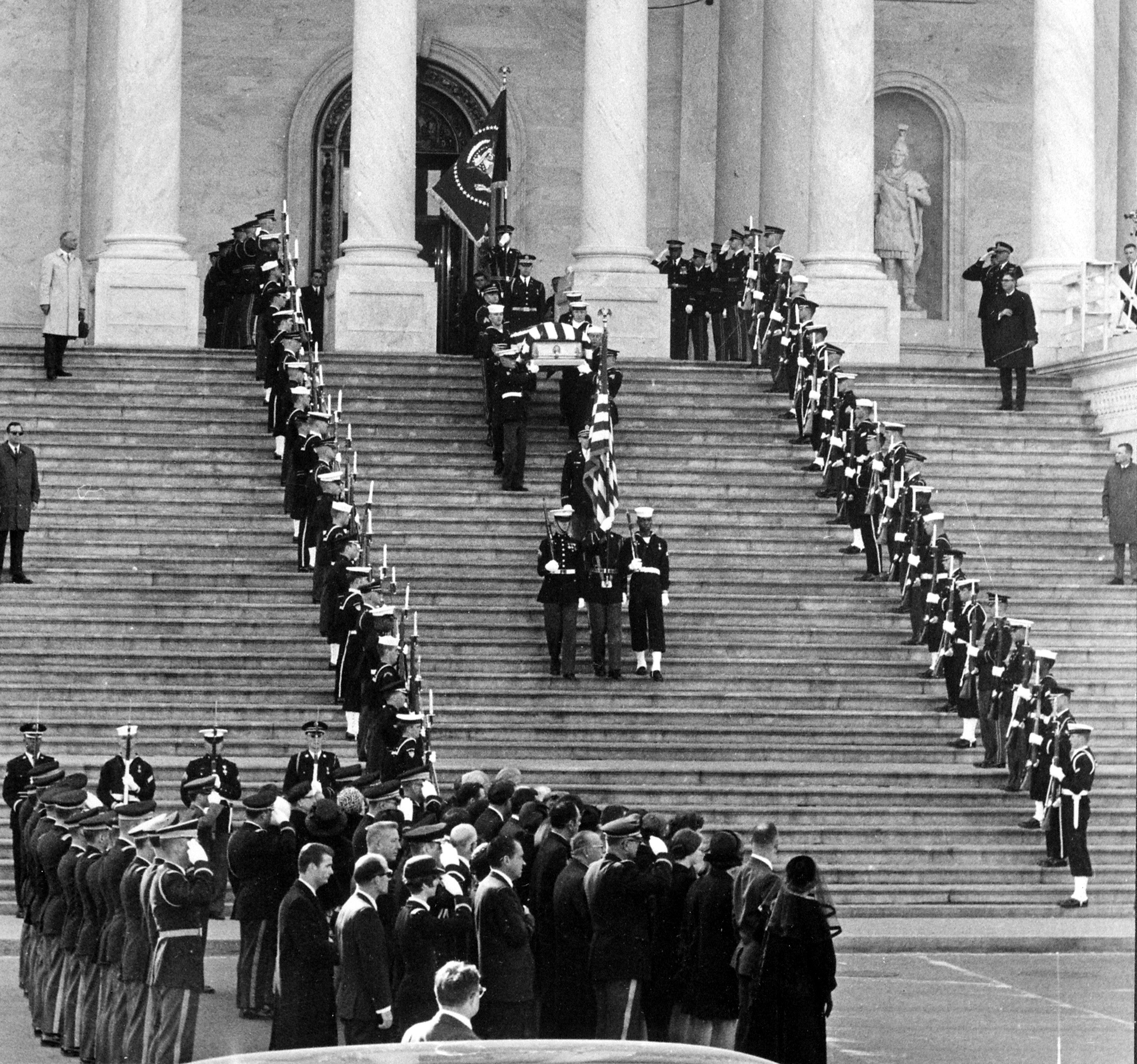
Eisenhower's funeral service

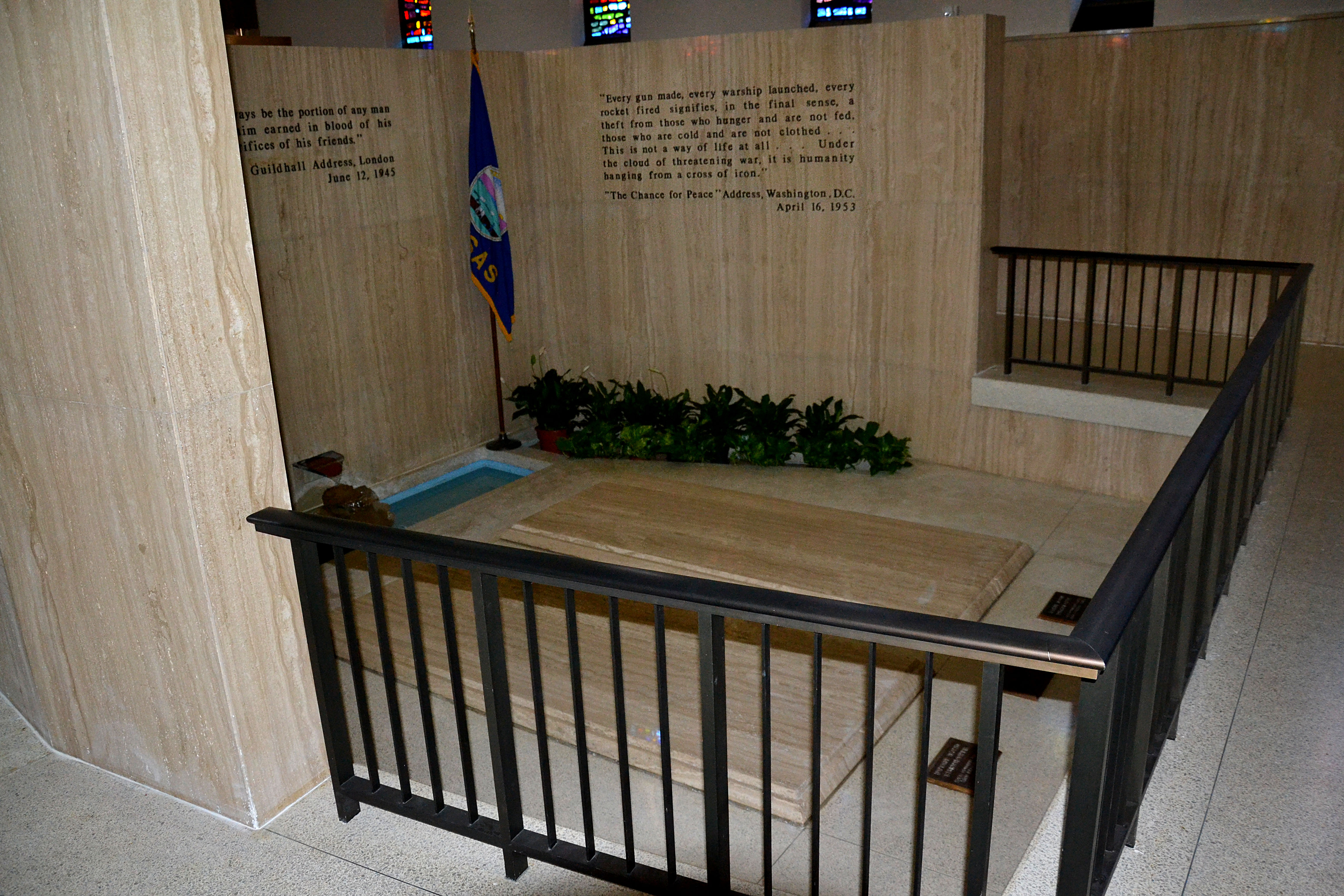
Graves of Dwight D. Eisenhower, Doud Dwight "Icky" Eisenhower and Mamie Eisenhower in Abilene, Kansas

Following the presidency, Eisenhower moved to the place where he and Mamie had spent much of their post-war time, a working farm adjacent to the battlefield at Gettysburg, Pennsylvania. They also maintained a retirement home in Palm Desert, California.

After leaving office, Eisenhower did not completely retreat from political life. He flew to San Antonio, where he had been stationed years earlier, to support John W. Goode, the unsuccessful Republican candidate against the Democrat Henry B. Gonzalez for Texas's 20th congressional district seat. He addressed the 1964 Republican National Convention, in San Francisco, and appeared with party nominee Barry Goldwater in a campaign commercial. That endorsement came somewhat reluctantly, because Goldwater had in the late 1950s criticized Eisenhower's administration as "a dime-store New Deal". On January 20, 1969, the day Nixon was inaugurated as President, Eisenhower issued a statement praising his former vice president and calling it a "day for rejoicing".

=== Death ===
At 12:25 p.m. on March 28, 1969, Eisenhower died from congestive heart failure at Walter Reed Army Medical Center in Washington, D.C., at age 78. His last words were: "I've always loved my wife, my children, and my grandchildren, and I've always loved my country. I want to go. God, take me." The following day, his body was moved to the Washington National Cathedral's Bethlehem Chapel, where he lay in repose for 28 hours. He was then transported to the United States Capitol, where he lay in state in the Capitol Rotunda on March 30 and 31. A state funeral was conducted at the Washington National Cathedral on March 31. The president and first lady, Richard and Pat Nixon, attended, as did former president Lyndon B. Johnson. Former President Harry S. Truman was unable to attend due to a vacation. Also among the 2,000 guests invited were UN Secretary-General U Thant and 191 foreign delegates from 78 countries, including 10 foreign heads of state and government—among them President Charles de Gaulle of France, who was in the United States for the first time since the state funeral of John F. Kennedy, Chancellor Kurt-Georg Kiesinger of West Germany, King Baudouin of Belgium and Shah Mohammad Reza Pahlavi of Iran.

The service included the singing of Faure's "The Palms", and the playing of the hymn "Onward, Christian Soldiers". That evening, Eisenhower's body was placed on a special funeral train for its journey from the capital to his hometown of Abilene, Kansas. First incorporated into President Abraham Lincoln's funeral in 1865, a funeral train would not be part of a US state funeral again until 2018. On April 2, 1969, Eisenhower was buried inside the Place of Meditation, the chapel on the grounds of the Eisenhower Presidential Center in Abilene. As requested, he was buried in a Government Issue casket, wearing his World War II uniform, decorated with Army Distinguished Service Medal with three oak leaf clusters, Navy Distinguished Service Medal, and the Legion of Merit. Buried alongside Eisenhower are his son Doud, who died at age 3 in 1921, and wife Mamie, who died in 1979.

President Richard Nixon eulogized Eisenhower in 1969, saying:

Some men are considered great because they lead great armies or they lead powerful nations. For eight years now, Dwight Eisenhower has neither commanded an army nor led a nation; and yet he remained through his final days the world's most admired and respected man, truly the first citizen of the world.

== Legacy and memory ==
=== Public and scholarly assessments of presidency ===
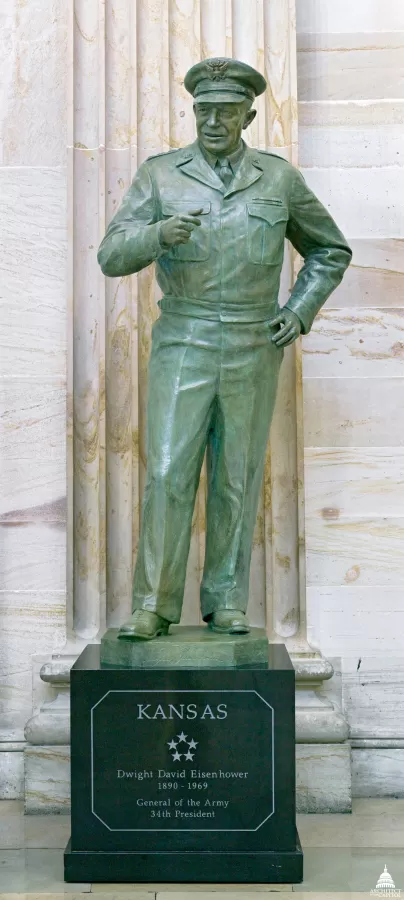
A statue of Dwight D. Eisenhower by Jim Brothers stands in the rotunda of the United States Capitol in Washington, D.C.

During his two terms as president, Eisenhower's approval ratings were consistently high, only briefly falling below 50 percent in 1958 and again in 1960. His overall average of 63 percent in the Gallup poll remains the second highest in history. With the popularity of his successor, John F. Kennedy, Eisenhower's reputation declined in the years after he left office. He was widely seen by critics as an inactive, uninspiring, golf-playing president, which was in stark contrast to Kennedy, who was 26 years his junior. Critics also compared Eisenhower with the likes of Calvin Coolidge as a "do nothing president". Despite his unprecedented use of Army troops to enforce a federal desegregation order at Central High School in Little Rock, Eisenhower was criticized for his reluctance to support the civil rights movement to the degree that activists wanted. Eisenhower also attracted criticism for his handling of the 1960 U-2 incident and the associated international embarrassment, for the Soviet Union's perceived leadership in the nuclear arms race and the Space Race, and for his failure to publicly oppose McCarthyism. In particular, Eisenhower was criticized for failing to defend George C. Marshall from attacks by Joseph McCarthy, though he privately deplored McCarthy's tactics.

Following the access of Eisenhower's private papers, his reputation changed amongst presidential historians. Historian John Lewis Gaddis has summarized a more recent turnaround in evaluations by historians:

Historians long ago abandoned the view that Eisenhower's was a failed presidency. He did, after all, end the Korean War without getting into any others. He stabilized, and did not escalate, the Soviet–American rivalry. He strengthened European alliances while withdrawing support from European colonialism. He rescued the Republican Party from isolationism and McCarthyism. He maintained prosperity, balanced the budget, promoted technological innovation, facilitated (if reluctantly) the civil rights movement and warned, in the most memorable farewell address since Washington's, of a "military–industrial complex" that could endanger the nation's liberties. Not until Reagan would another president leave office with so strong a sense of having accomplished what he set out to do.

Since 1982, scholars and historians have typically ranked Eisenhower among the ten best US presidents. Rexford Tugwell, a top aide to Franklin Roosevelt, referred to Eisenhower as "the least partisan president since George Washington." Historian Garry Wills called Eisenhower "a political genius" for making difficult foreign policy goals "look easy" to the general public to prevent further stress.

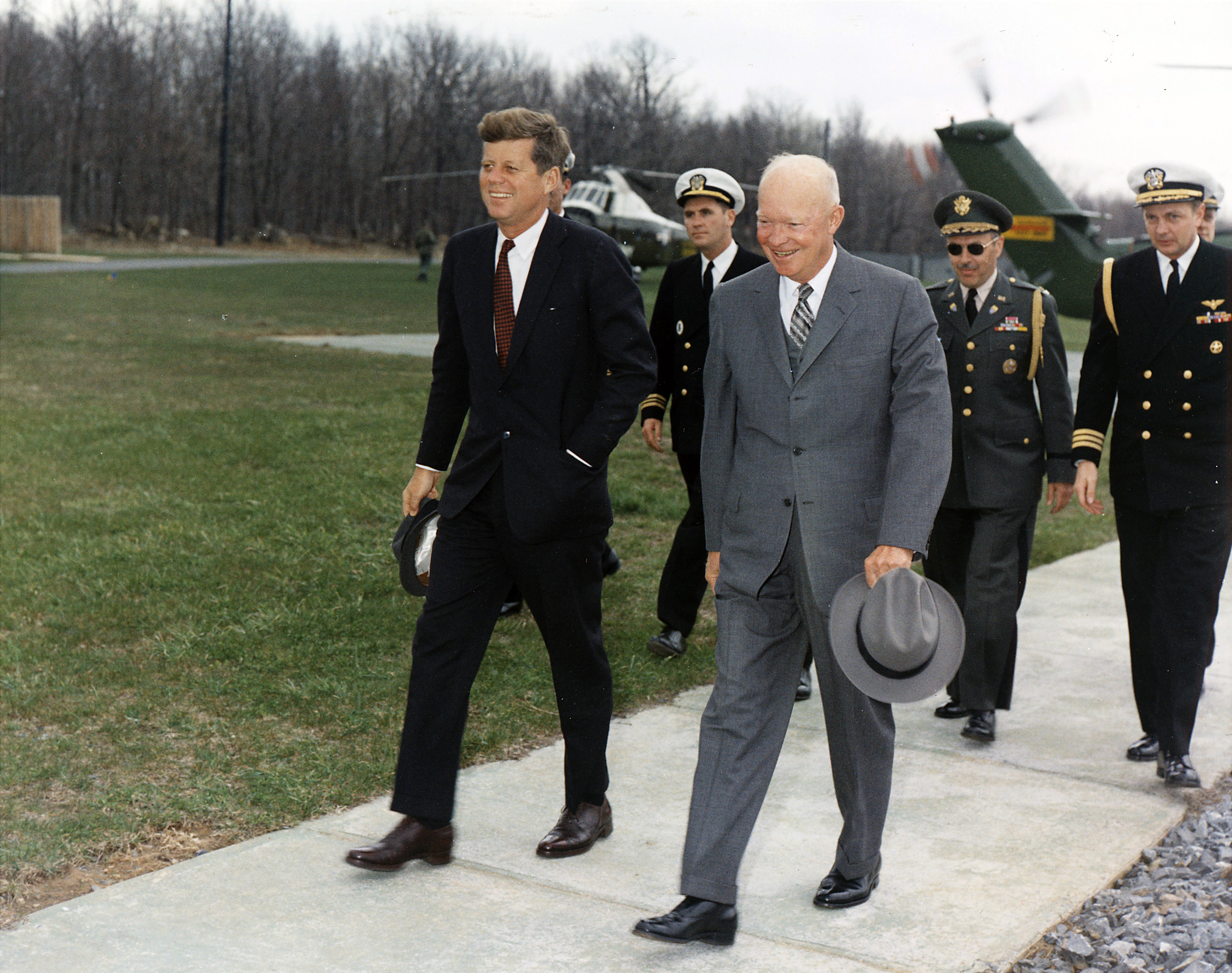
President John F. Kennedy meets with General Eisenhower at Camp David, April 22, 1961, three days after the failed Bay of Pigs Invasion.

=== Political views and practice ===
Although conservatism in politics was strong during the 1950s, and Eisenhower generally espoused conservative sentiments, his administration concerned itself mostly with foreign affairs and pursued a hands-off domestic policy. He looked to moderation and cooperation as a means of governance, which he dubbed "The Middle Way". American historian and policy advisor Bruce Bartlett has described Eisenhower as a "true centrist who really belonged to neither party".

Although he sought to slow or contain the New Deal and other federal programs, he did not attempt to repeal them outright. In doing so, Eisenhower was popular among the liberal and left-leaning wing of the Republican Party. Conservative critics of his administration thought that he did not do enough to advance the goals of the right; according to Hans Morgenthau, "Eisenhower's victories were but accidents without consequence in the history of the Republican party." Eisenhower was a self-described ideological moderate and progressive conservative. He supported moderate fiscal conservatism and disdained ideological extremism, saying of his governing style:

In all those things which deal with people, be liberal, be human. In all those things which deal with people's money, or their economy, or their form of government, be conservative.

Eisenhower introduced the office of White House Chief of Staff – an idea he borrowed from the United States Army. Every president after Lyndon Johnson has appointed staff to this position. As president, Eisenhower also initiated the "up or out" policy that still prevails in the US military. Officers who are passed over for promotion twice are then usually honorably but quickly discharged to make way for younger and more able officers.

On December 20, 1944, Eisenhower was appointed to the rank of General of the Army, placing him in the company of George Marshall, Henry "Hap" Arnold, and Douglas MacArthur, the only four men to achieve the rank in World War II. Along with Omar Bradley, they were the only five men to achieve the rank since the August 5, 1888, death of Philip Sheridan, and the only five men to hold the rank of five-star general. The rank was created by an Act of Congress on a temporary basis, when Public Law 78-482 was passed on December 14, 1944, as a temporary rank, subject to reversion to permanent rank six months after the end of the war. The temporary rank was declared permanent on March 23, 1946, by Public Law 333 of the 79th Congress, which also awarded full pay and allowances in the grade to those on the retired list. It was created to give the most senior American commanders parity of rank with their British counterparts holding the ranks of field marshal and admiral of the fleet.

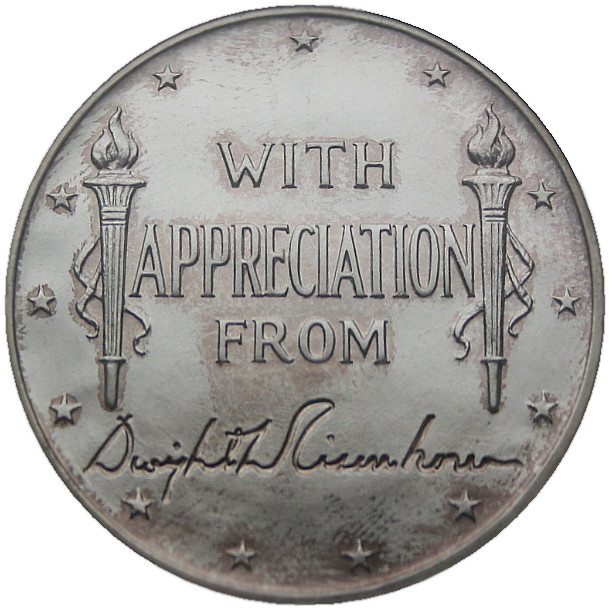
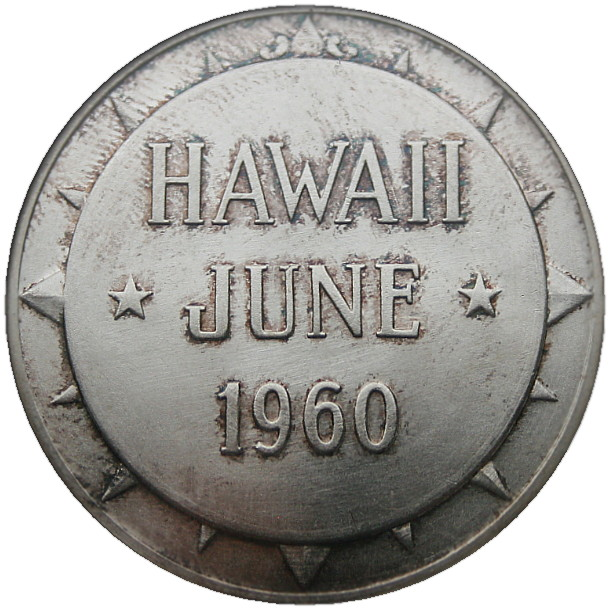
Frank Gasparro's obverse design (left) and reverse design (right) of the Presidential Medal of Appreciation award during Eisenhower's official visit to the State of Hawaii from June 20 to 25, 1960

Eisenhower founded People to People International in 1956, believing that citizen interaction would promote cultural interaction and world peace. The program includes a student ambassador component, which sends American youth on educational trips to other countries.

During his second term as president, Eisenhower awarded a series of specially designed US Mint presidential appreciation medals. Eisenhower presented the medal to individuals as an expression of his appreciation. The development of the appreciation medals was initiated by the White House and executed by the United States Mint, through the Philadelphia Mint. The medals were struck from September 1958 through October 1960. A total of twenty designs are cataloged with a total mintage of 9,858. Prior to the end of his second term as president, 1,451 medals were turned in to the Bureau of the Mint and destroyed. The Eisenhower appreciation medals are part of the Presidential Medal of Appreciation Award Medal Series.

=== Tributes and memorials ===
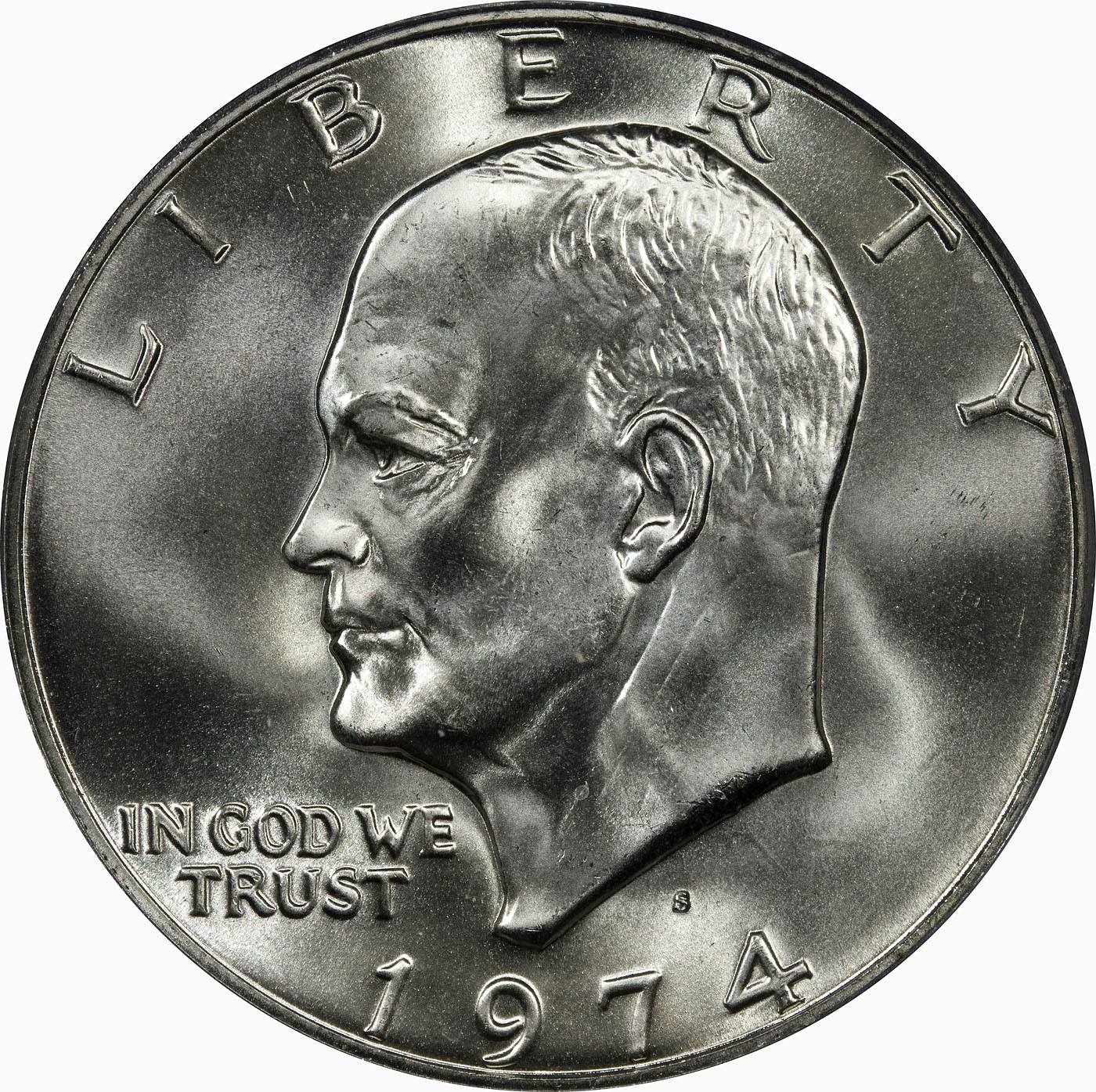
The Eisenhower dollar was the official dollar coin from 1971 to 1978.

The Interstate Highway System is officially known as the "Dwight D. Eisenhower National System of Interstate and Defense Highways". It was inspired in part by Eisenhower's experiences in World War II, where he recognized the advantages of the autobahn system in Germany. Commemorative signs reading "Eisenhower Interstate System" and bearing Eisenhower's permanent 5-star rank insignia were introduced in 1993 and now are displayed throughout the Interstate System. Several highways are also named for him, including the Eisenhower Expressway (Interstate 290) near Chicago, the Eisenhower Tunnel on Interstate 70 west of Denver, and Interstate 80 in California.

Dwight D. Eisenhower School for National Security and Resource Strategy is a senior war college of the Department of Defense's National Defense University in Washington, DC. Eisenhower graduated from this school when it was known as the Army Industrial College. Eisenhower was honored on the Eisenhower dollar, minted from 1971 to 1978. His centenary was honored on the Eisenhower commemorative dollar issued in 1990.

In 1969 four major record companies – ABC Records, MGM Records, Buddha Records and Caedmon Audio – released tribute albums in Eisenhower's honor.

In 1999, the United States Congress created the Dwight D. Eisenhower Memorial Commission, to create an enduring national memorial in Washington, D.C. In 2009 the commission chose the architect Frank Gehry to design the memorial. The groundbreaking ceremony of the memorial was held on November 3, 2017, and was dedicated on September 17, 2020. It stands on a 4-acre (1.6 ha) site near the National Mall on Maryland Avenue, across the street from the National Air and Space Museum.

In December 1999 he was listed on Gallup's List of Most Widely Admired People of the 20th century. In 2009 he was named to the World Golf Hall of Fame in the Lifetime Achievement category for his contributions to the sport. In 1973, he was inducted into the Hall of Great Westerners of the National Cowboy & Western Heritage Museum.

In August 2009 the Pittsford National Fish Hatchery — a component of the United States Fish and Wildlife Service's National Fish Hatchery System in Vermont — was renamed the Dwight D. Eisenhower National Fish Hatchery to commemorate a June 1955 visit Eisenhower made to the hatchery. A few months after his visit, Eisenhower had secured funding for a complete reconstruction of the hatchery.

Fort Gordon was briefly redesignated Fort Eisenhower between October 2023 and June 2025. (Note: Redesignation to Fort Eisenhower was on October 27, 2023.)

== Honors ==
=== Awards and decorations ===
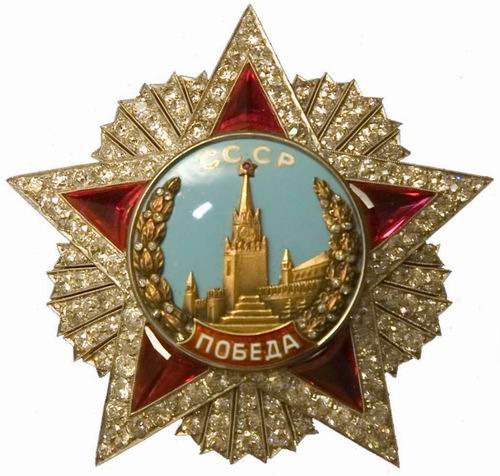
The star of the Soviet Order of Victory awarded to Eisenhower

The coat of arms granted to Eisenhower upon his incorporation as a knight of the Danish Order of the Elephant in 1950. The anvil represents the fact that his name is derived from the German for "iron hewer", making these an example of canting arms.

US military decorations
Army Distinguished Service Medal w/ 4 oak leaf clusters
Navy Distinguished Service Medal
Legion of Merit
US service medals
Mexican Border Service Medal
World War I Victory Medal
American Defense Service Medal
European–African–Middle Eastern Campaign Medal w/ 9 campaign stars
World War II Victory Medal
Army of Occupation Medal w/ "Germany" clasp
International and foreign awards
Order of the Liberator San Martin, Grand Cross (Argentina)
Grand Decoration of Honour in Gold with Sash (Austria)
Order of Leopold, Grand Cordon (Belgium) – 1945
Croix de guerre w/ palm (Belgium)
Order of the Southern Cross, Grand Cross (Brazil)
Order of Military Merit (Brazil), Grand Cross
Order of Aeronautical Merit, Grand Cross (Brazil)
War Medal (Brazil)
Campaign Medal (Brazil)
Order of Merit, Grand Cross (Chile)
Order of the Cloud and Banner, with Special Grand Cordon, (China)
Military Order of the White Lion, Grand Cross (Czechoslovakia)
War Cross 1939–1945 (Czechoslovakia)
Order of the Elephant, Knight (Denmark) – December 15, 1945
Order of Abdon Calderón, First Class (Ecuador)
Order of Ismail, Grand Cordon (Egypt)
Order of Solomon, Knight Grand Cross with Cordon (Ethiopia)
Order of the Queen of Sheba, Member (Ethiopia)
Legion of Honour, Grand Cross (France) – 1943
Order of Liberation, Companion (France)
Military Medal (France)
Croix de guerre w/ palm (France)
Royal Order of George I, Knight Grand Cross with Swords (Greece)
Order of the Redeemer, Knight Grand Cross (Greece)
Cross of Military Merit, First Class (Guatemala)
National Order of Honour and Merit, Grand Cross with Gold Badge (Haiti)
Order of the Holy Sepulchre, Knight Grand Cross (Holy See)
Military Order of Italy, Knight Grand Cross (Italy)
Order of the Chrysanthemum, Collar (Japan)
Order of the Oak Crown, Grand Cross (Luxembourg)
Military Medal (Luxembourg)
Order pro merito Melitensi, KGC (Sovereign Military Order of Malta)
Order of the Aztec Eagle, Collar (Mexico) – 1945
Medal of Military Merit (Mexico)
Medal of Civic Merit (Mexico)
Order of Muhammad, (Morocco)
Order of Ouissam Alaouite, Grand Cross (Morocco)
Order of the Netherlands Lion, Knight Grand Cross (Netherlands) – October 6, 1945
Royal Norwegian Order of St. Olav, Grand Cross (Norway)
Order of Nishan-e-Pakistan, First Class (Pakistan) – December 7, 1957
Order of Manuel Amador Guerrero, Grand Officer (Panama)
Orden Vasco Núñez de Balboa, Grand Cross (Panama)
Order of Sikatuna, Grand Collar (Philippines)
Legion of Honor (Philippines), Chief Commander (Philippines)
Distinguished Service Star, (Philippines)
Order of Polonia Restituta, Grand Cross (Poland)
Order of Virtuti Militari, First Class (Poland)
Cross of Grunwald, First Class (Poland)
Order of the Royal House of Chakri, Knight (Thailand)
Order of Glory, Grand Cordon (Tunisia)
Order of the Bath, Knight Grand Cross (United Kingdom): Military Division 1945; Civil Division 1957
Order of Merit (United Kingdom): Member Military Division June 12, 1945
Africa Star, with 8th Army clasp (United Kingdom)
War Medal 1939–1945 (United Kingdom)
Order of Victory (Union of Soviet Socialist Republics)
Order of Suvorov First Class (Union of Soviet Socialist Republics)
The Royal Yugoslav Commemorative War Cross (Yugoslavia)

=== Freedom of the City ===
Eisenhower received the Freedom honor from several locations, including:

- (England) Freedom of the City of London on June 12, 1945
- (Northern Ireland) Freedom of the City of Belfast on August 24, 1945
- (Scotland) Freedom of the City of Edinburgh in 1946
- (Scotland) Freedom of the Burgh of Maybole in October 1946

=== Honorary degrees ===
Eisenhower received many honorary degrees from universities and colleges around the world. These included:

Location	Date	School	Degree	Gave commencement address
Northern Ireland	August 24, 1945	Queen's University Belfast	Doctor of Laws (LL.D)	
England	1945	University of Oxford	Doctor of Civil Law (DCL)	
Massachusetts	1946	Harvard University	Doctor of Laws (LL.D)	
Pennsylvania	1946	Gettysburg College	Doctorate	
Ontario	1946	University of Toronto	Doctor of Laws (LL.D)	
Pennsylvania	1947	University of Pennsylvania	Doctor of Laws (LL.D)	
Connecticut	1948	Yale University	Doctor of Laws (LL.D)	
New York	1950	Hofstra University	Doctorate	
New Hampshire	June 14, 1953	Dartmouth College	Doctorate	Yes
Washington, D.C.	November 19, 1953	Catholic University of America	Doctor of Laws (LL.D)	
Virginia	1953	College of William and Mary	Doctor of Laws (LL.D)	
Illinois	1954	Northwestern University	Doctor of Laws (LL.D)	
Maryland	June 7, 1954	Washington College	Doctor of Laws (LL.D)	Yes
Maryland	1958	Johns Hopkins University	Doctor of Laws (LL.D)	
India	December 17, 1959	University of Delhi	Doctor of Laws (LL.D)	
Indiana	June 5, 1960	University of Notre Dame	Doctor of Laws (LL.D)	
Philippines	June 16, 1960	University of the Philippines	Doctor of Laws (LL.D)	
New York	June 20, 1964	Bard College	Doctor of Laws (LL.D)	
Iowa	1965	Grinnell College	Doctor of Laws (LL.D)	
Ohio	October 5, 1965	Ohio University	Doctor of Humane Letters (DHL)	Yes

== Promotions ==
No insignia	Cadet, United States Military Academy: June 14, 1911
No pin insignia in 1915	Second Lieutenant, Regular Army: June 12, 1915
	First Lieutenant, Regular Army: July 1, 1916
	Captain, Regular Army: May 15, 1917
	Major, National Army: June 17, 1918
	Lieutenant Colonel, National Army: October 20, 1918
	Captain, Regular Army: June 30, 1920 (Reverted to permanent rank.)
	Major, Regular Army: July 2, 1920
	Captain, Regular Army: November 4, 1922 (Discharged as major and appointed as captain due to reduction of Army.)
	Major, Regular Army: August 26, 1924
	Lieutenant Colonel, Regular Army: July 1, 1936
	Colonel, Army of the United States: March 6, 1941
	Brigadier General, Army of the United States: September 29, 1941 (temporary)
	Major General, Army of the United States: March 27, 1942 (temporary)
	Lieutenant General, Army of the United States: July 7, 1942 (temporary)
	General, Army of the United States: February 11, 1943 (temporary)
	Brigadier General, Regular Army: August 30, 1943
	Major General, Regular Army: August 30, 1943
	General of the Army, Army of the United States: December 20, 1944
	General of the Army, Regular Army: April 11, 1946

== See also ==
- "And I don't care what it is", phrase on religion by Eisenhower, 1952
- Atoms for Peace, speech to the UN General Assembly, 1953
- Committee on Scientists and Engineers
- Eisenhower baseball controversy
- Eisenhower method for time management
- Eisenhower National Historic Site
- Eisenhower Presidential Center
- Ike: Countdown to D-Day, American television film, 2004
- Kay Summersby, chauffeur and secretary
- People to People Student Ambassador Program

=== General ===
- Historical rankings of presidents of the United States
- History of the United States (1945–1964)
- List of presidents of the United States
- List of presidents of the United States by previous experience

== Notes ==
Military offices
Preceded by James E. Chaney; Jacob L. Devers	Commanding General of the United States Army Europe; 1942–1943; 1944–1945	Succeeded by Frank Maxwell Andrews; Joseph T. McNarney
New office	Supreme Commander Allied Expeditionary Force; 1944–1945	Office abolished
New office	Governor of the American Zone of Occupied Germany; 1945	Succeeded by George S. Patton as acting governor
Preceded by George Marshall	Chief of Staff of the United States Army; 1945–1948	Succeeded by Omar Bradley
New office	Supreme Allied Commander Europe; 1951–1952	Succeeded by Matthew Ridgway
Academic offices
Preceded by Frank D. Fackenthal as acting president	President of Columbia University; 1948–1953	Succeeded by Grayson L. Kirk
Party political offices
Preceded by Thomas E. Dewey	Republican nominee for President of the United States; 1952, 1956	Succeeded by Richard Nixon
Political offices
Preceded by Harry S. Truman	President of the United States; 1953–1961	Succeeded by John F. Kennedy
Honorary titles
Preceded by Herbert Hoover	People who have lain in state or honor in the United States Capitol rotunda 1969	Succeeded by Everett Dirksen
