= Family of Dwight D. Eisenhower =

Eisenhower family
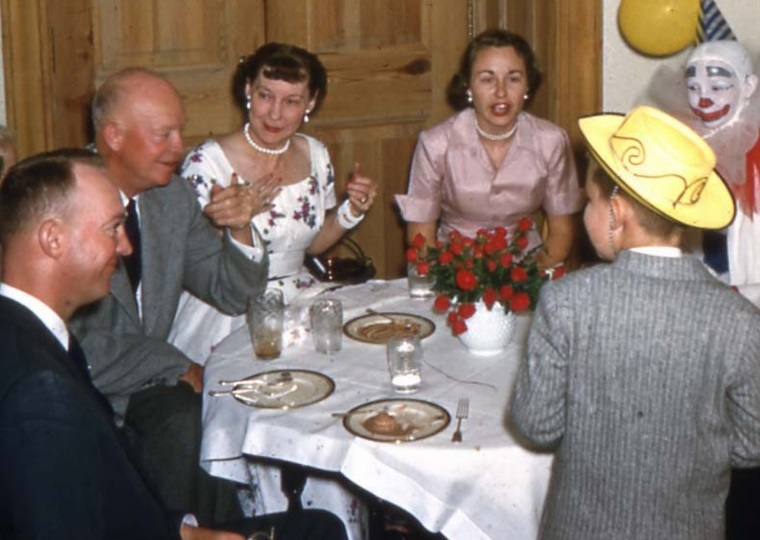
- Birthday party for granddaughter Anne Eisenhower, 1956. From left to right around the table: John Eisenhower, Dwight D. Eisenhower, Mamie Eisenhower, Barbara Eisenhower, and David Eisenhower with his back to the camera.
- Current region: United States (Texas, Kansas, Washington, D.C.)
- Titles: List: President of the United States; First Lady of the United States; General of the Army; Supreme Commander Allied Expeditionary Force; Supreme Allied Commander Europe; Chief of Staff of the United States Army; Commanding General of the United States Army Europe; Military Governor of the American-occupied zone of Germany; United States Ambassador to Belgium; President of Columbia University; President of Johns Hopkins University; President of Pennsylvania State University; President of Kansas State University; Director of the War Relocation Authority; Chairman of People to People International
- Members: Dwight D. Eisenhower, Mamie Eisenhower, David Eisenhower, Anne Eisenhower, Susan Eisenhower, Mary Jean Eisenhower

The family of Dwight D. Eisenhower, the 34th president of the United States, and his wife, Mamie, consists predominantly of German and Pennsylvania Dutch background. They are related by marriage to the family of Richard Nixon, who was Eisenhower's vice-president, and was later the 37th president of the United States.

== Family tree ==
Frederick Eisenhower (1794–1884)	Barbara Raysor Miller (1789–1862)
Jacob Frederick Eisenhower (1826–1906)	Margareta Rebecca Matter (1825–1890)
David Jacob Eisenhower (1863–1942)	Ida Stover (1862–1946)
Dwight D. Eisenhower (1890–1969)	Mamie Doud (1896–1979)
Richard Nixon (1913–1994)	Pat Ryan (1912–1993)	Doud Eisenhower (1917–1921)	John Eisenhower (1922–2013)	Barbara Thompson (1926–2014)
Edward Cox (1946–present)	Tricia Nixon (1946–present)	Julie Nixon (1948–present)	David Eisenhower (1948–present)	Fernando; Echavarría-Uribe	Anne Eisenhower (1949–2022)	Susan Eisenhower (1951–present)	John Mahon	Mary Eisenhower (1955–present)	Ralph Atwater
Andrea Catsimatidis (1990–present)	Christopher Cox (1979–present)	Anthony Cheslock (1977–present)	Jennie Eisenhower (1978–present)	Alex Eisenhower (1980–present)	Tara Brennan (1979–present)	Melanie Eisenhower (1984–present)	Adriana Echavarria (1969–present)	Amelia Eisenhower Mahon (1981/82–present)	Merrill Eisenhower Atwater (1981–present)
Chloe Cheslock (2013–present)	Kaia Eisenhower (2007–present)	Kaeden Eisenhower (2013–present)

== Family background ==
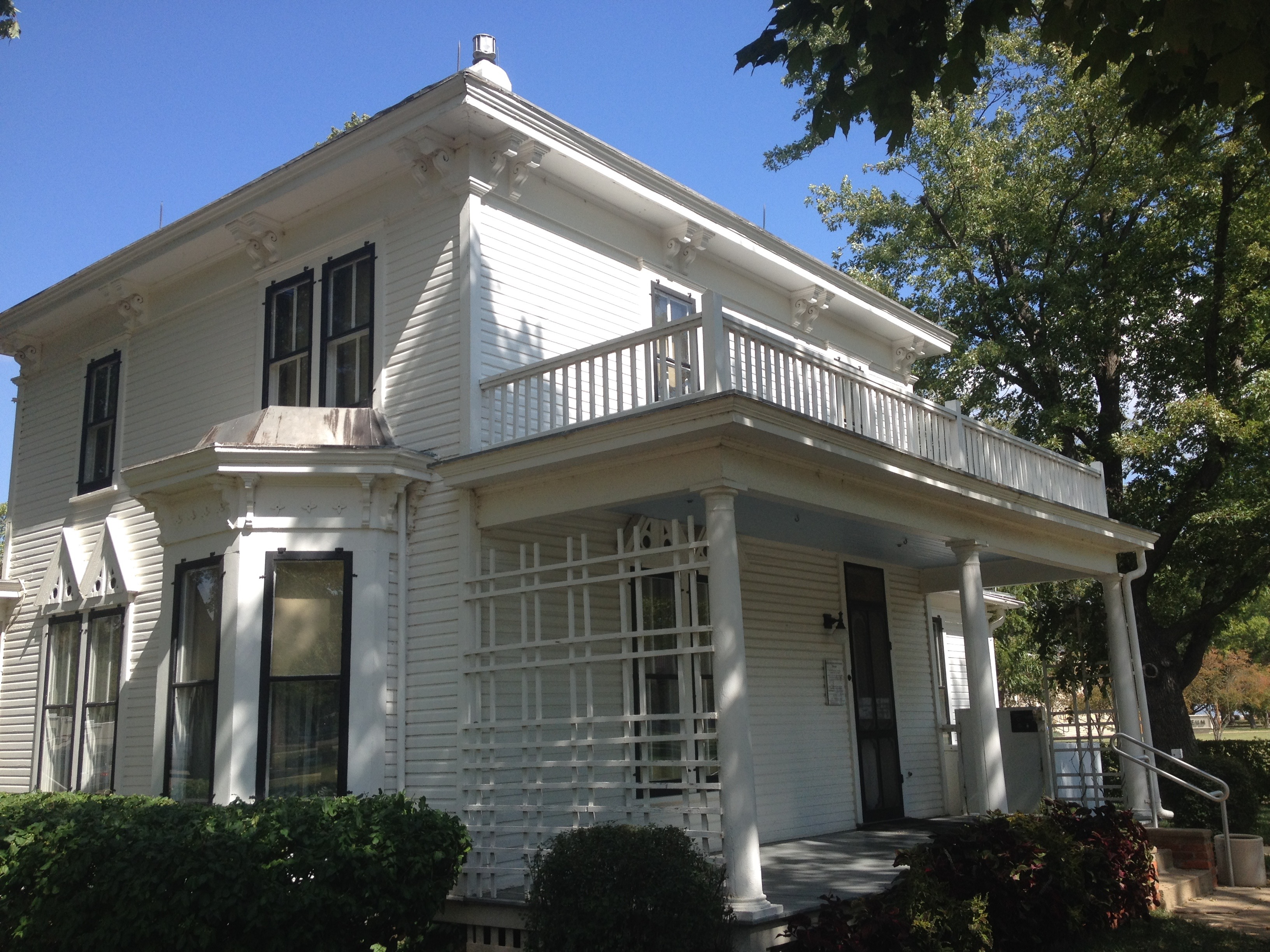
The Eisenhower family home, Abilene, Kansas

The Eisenhauer (German for "iron hewer/miner") family migrated to America from Karlsbrunn (Nassau-Saarbrücken) in 1741, first settling in York, Pennsylvania. They moved to Kansas in the 1880s. Accounts vary as to how and when the German name Eisenhauer was anglicized to Eisenhower. Eisenhower's Pennsylvania Dutch ancestors, who were primarily farmers, included Hans Nikolaus Eisenhauer of Karlsbrunn, who migrated to Lancaster, Pennsylvania, in 1741. Dwight D. Eisenhower's lineage includes German ancestors and Swiss German ancestors.

== Parents and siblings ==
The great-grandson of Hans Nikolaus Eisenhauer was Jacob Eisenhower, a Kansas farmer. Jacob's son, David Jacob Eisenhower (1863–1942), was Dwight D. Eisenhower's father. David Jacob was a college-educated engineer, despite his father having urged him to stay on the family farm. David owned a general store in Hope, Kansas, but the business failed due to economic conditions and the family became impoverished. The Eisenhowers then lived in Texas from 1889 until 1892, and later returned to Kansas, with $24 (equivalent to $860 in 2025) to their name at the time. David worked as a railroad mechanic and then at a creamery.

Eisenhower's mother, Ida Elizabeth (Stover) Eisenhower, born in Virginia, of predominantly German Protestant ancestry, moved to Kansas from Virginia. She married David on September 23, 1885, in Lecompton, Kansas, on the campus of their alma mater, Lane University.

By 1898, the parents made a decent living and provided a suitable home for their large family. They had seven sons, of whom one died in infancy.

- Arthur Bradford Eisenhower (November 11, 1886 – January 27, 1958)
- Edgar Newton Eisenhower (January 19, 1889 – July 12, 1971)
- Dwight David Eisenhower (October 14, 1890 – March 28, 1969)
- Roy Jacob Eisenhower (August 9, 1892 – June 7, 1942)
- Paul Dawson Eisenhower (May 12, 1894 – March 16, 1895)
- Earl Dewey Eisenhower (February 1, 1898 – December 18, 1968)
- Milton Stover Eisenhower (September 15, 1899 – May 2, 1985)

Of these, Milton was the most notable of the brothers other than Dwight. Milton became an American educational administrator, serving as president of three major American universities: Kansas State University (1943–1950), Pennsylvania State University (1950–1956), and Johns Hopkins University (1956–1957). On October 12, 1927, Eisenhower married Helen Elsie Eakin (1904–1954), with whom he had a son, Milton Stover Eisenhower, Jr., in 1930 and a daughter, Ruth Eakin Eisenhower, in 1938.

Earl also achieved a measure of notability, having been elected to a term in the Illinois House of Representatives, from 1965 to 1967. Earl married Kathryn McIntyre Snyder in 1933, with whom he had two children.

Edgar graduated from the University of Michigan in 1914, and began practicing law in 1915 in Tacoma, Washington; he became known as a "shoot from the hip ultraconservative." Edgar was married three times, first to Louise Alexander Eisenhower (1893–1946) in 1911, then to Bernice Thompson Eisenhower (1902–1948) in 1940, and finally to Lucille Dawson Eisenhower (1921–2012) in 1951. Edgar had two children, both with his first wife, Merrill Jack Eisenhower (1916–1956), and Janis Louise Eisenhower Causin (1922–2000).

== Immediate family ==
=== Mamie Eisenhower ===
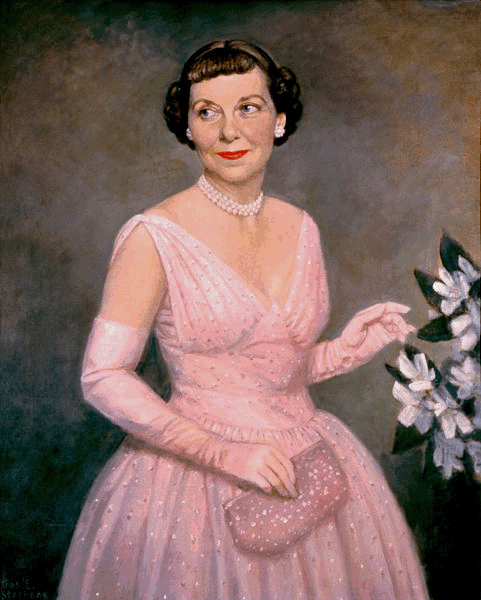
Mamie Eisenhower, painted in 1959 by Thomas E. Stephens

While Eisenhower was stationed in Texas, he met Mamie Doud of Boone, Iowa.

Doud was the second child born to John Sheldon Doud (1870–1951), a meatpacking executive, and his wife, Elivera Mathilda Carlson (1878–1960). Mamie was born in Boone, Iowa, on November 14, 1896. She grew up in Cedar Rapids, Iowa; Colorado Springs, Colorado; Denver, Colorado; and the Doud winter home in San Antonio, Texas. Her father, who retired at age 36, ran a meatpacking company founded by his father, Doud & Montgomery ("Buyers of Live Hogs"), and had investments in Illinois and Iowa stockyards. Her mother was a daughter of Swedish immigrants. She had three sisters: Eleanor Carlson Doud, Eda Mae Doud, and Mabel Frances "Mike" Doud.

Doud and Eisenhower were immediately taken with each other. He proposed to her on Valentine's Day in 1916. A November wedding date in Denver was moved up to July 1 due to the pending U.S. entry into World War I. They moved many times during their first 35 years of marriage.

=== Children ===
==== Doud Eisenhower ====
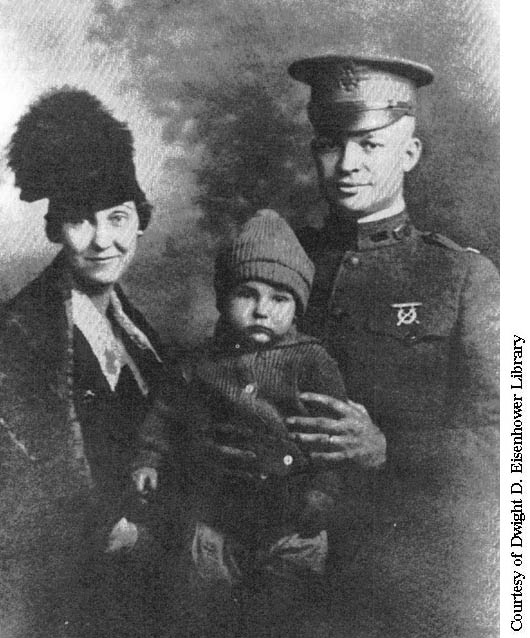
Doud with his parents, Mamie and Dwight.

Doud Dwight Eisenhower (September 24, 1917 – January 2, 1921) was the first son of Dwight and Mamie Eisenhower. He was named "Doud" in honor of his mother (whose maiden name was Doud) and "Dwight" in honor of his father. He was commonly called "Ikky" (pronounced as "icky") by his parents.

Doud was born in San Antonio, Texas, then he and his mother moved to Denver, Colorado, while his father was stationed at Camp Meade in Maryland. Regarding Dwight's family contacts while on the U.S. Army's 1919 Transcontinental Motor Convoy, biographers Lester and Irene David wrote:

He called Mamie several times a week [while on the convoy], beginning each call with requests for news about Icky [sic]. How was he growing? What new mischief had he gotten into? Once Mamie interrupted with, "Listen here...how about asking how your wife is?" Chastened; Ike chatted for a moment about Mamie but soon turned the conversation to Icky again. Mamie gave up.

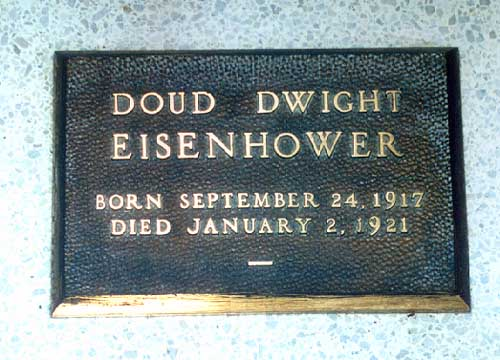
Grave of Doud Dwight Eisenhower in Eisenhower Center

After he and his family relocated to Fort Meade in Severn, Maryland, his mother hired a 16-year-old local girl as a maid. She had been recovering from scarlet fever. In December 1920, shortly before Christmas, Ikky caught scarlet fever from her. Though his mother tried desperately to save him, even calling a specialist from Johns Hopkins Hospital in Baltimore, Ikky died on January 2, 1921. His father referred to this incident as "the most shattering moment of their lives, one that almost destroyed their marriage". Mamie and Dwight blamed themselves for Ikky's death; had they checked the girl's background, they would have found out that she had scarlet fever. In his biography of Eisenhower, Stephen E. Ambrose wrote:

These feelings had to be suppressed if the marriage was to survive the disaster, but suppression did not eliminate the unwanted thoughts, only made them harder to live with. Both the inner-directed guilt and the projected feelings of blame placed a strain on their marriage. So did the equally inevitable sense of loss, the grief that could not be comforted, the feeling that all the joy had gone out of life. "For a long time, it was as if a shining light had gone out in Ike's life," Mamie said later. "Throughout all the years that followed, the memory of those bleak days was a deep inner pain that never seemed to diminish much."

On January 7, 1921, less than a week after his death, Ikky was buried in Fairmont Cemetery in Denver, Colorado. Eisenhower was mostly reticent to discuss his death. In 1966, he was re-interred at the Eisenhower Presidential Center. His parents were buried next to him. In 1967, Eisenhower would look to Ikky's death as "the greatest disappointment and disaster of my life, the one I have never been able to forget completely". For the rest of his life, he sent Mamie flowers on Ikky's birthday each year.

==== John Eisenhower ====
John Sheldon Doud Eisenhower (August 3, 1922 – December 21, 2013) was born in Denver, Colorado. John served in the United States Army, his decorated military career spanned from before, during, and after his father's presidency, and he retired from active duty as a brigadier general in 1963 and then altogether in 1974. Coincidentally, John graduated from West Point on D-Day, June 6, 1944. After his military service, he became an author and military historian, and served as U.S. Ambassador to Belgium from 1969 to 1971, during the administration of President Richard Nixon, previously his father's vice president.

John Eisenhower married Barbara Jean Thompson on June 10, 1947, only a few days before her twenty-first birthday. Barbara was born on June 15, 1926, in Fort Knox, Kentucky, into an Army family. She was the daughter of Col. Percy Walter Thompson (November 8, 1898 – June 19, 1974) by his wife Beatrice (née Birchfield). Col. Thompson was commander of the Allied Expeditionary Forces. John and Barbara had four children: David, Barbara Ann, Susan Elaine, and Mary Jean. David, after whom Camp David is named, married Richard Nixon's daughter Julie in 1968.

John and Barbara divorced in 1986 after thirty-nine years of marriage. In 1988, Barbara married widower Edwin J. Foltz, a former vice president at the Campbell's. She died on September 19, 2014, in Gladwyne, Montgomery County, Pennsylvania.

In 1988, John married Joanne Thompson. He lived in Trappe, Maryland, after moving there from Kimberton, Pennsylvania.

== Extended family ==
=== Grandchildren ===
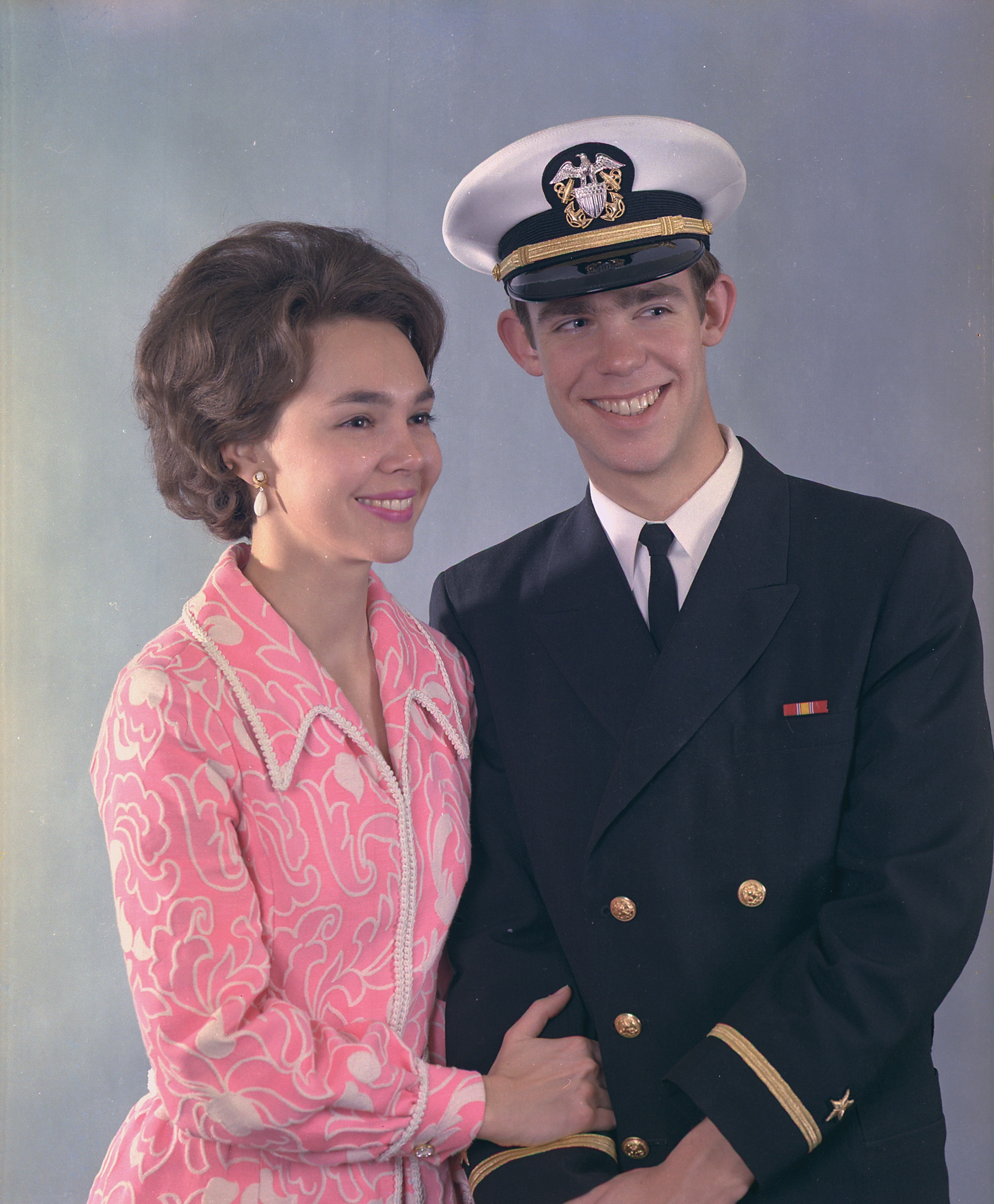
Julie and David Eisenhower (age 23) in 1971

==== David Eisenhower (born 1948) ====
Dwight David Eisenhower II (born March 31, 1948), better known as David Eisenhower is an American author, public policy fellow, professor at the University of Pennsylvania, and eponym of the U.S. presidential retreat, Camp David. He is the only grandson of Dwight D. Eisenhower, and the son-in-law of Richard Nixon by marriage to Nixon's daughter, Julie Nixon. The couple had three children: Jennie Elizabeth (born August 15, 1978), an actress, Alexander Richard (b. 1980) and Melanie Catherine Eisenhower (b. 1984).

==== Anne Eisenhower (1949–2022) ====
Barbara Anne Eisenhower (May 30, 1949 – July 30, 2022), better known as Anne Eisenhower, was a prominent interior designer based in New York City.

Anne's first husband was Fernando Echavarría-Uribe, an insurance executive from Bogotá, Colombia, whom she met while vacationing in South America in 1966. They married in November 1968, and six months later had a daughter, Adriana Echavarría (born May 29, 1969). Adriana became a photographer, and was married for a time to Eduardo Mendoza de la Torre, the ex vice minister of justice in Colombia and later a vice president of Avianca, who was the only man to have ever testified against the notorious drug lord Pablo Escobar. Through Adriana, Anne had two grandchildren, Camila and Nicolás Mendoza.

In the 1980s, Anne married Wolfgang Flöttl, a billionaire hedge-fund manager who once owned an art collection with pieces by Van Gogh, Picasso, and Cézanne. Anne filed for divorce from Flöttl in 2018.

==== Susan Eisenhower (born 1951) ====
Susan Elaine Eisenhower (born December 31, 1951) is an American consultant, author, and expert on international security, space policy, energy, and relations between the Russian Federation and the United States of America.

Susan has been married three times, first to Alexander H. Bradshaw, a London barrister, with whom she has two daughters, secondly to John Mahon, an American lawyer, with whom she had a daughter, Amelia Eisenhower Mahon, and finally to Russian space scientist Roald Sagdeev, formerly the director of the Russian Space Research Institute, Hero of Socialist Labor, and pro-democracy advocate.

==== Mary Jean Eisenhower (born 1955) ====
Mary Jean Eisenhower (born December 21, 1955) is an American humanitarian. She is the president and chief executive officer (and former president and chairman emeritus) of People to People International.

She married Army 2nd Lt. James Brewton Millard in May 1976, at a private military ceremony in Valley Forge, Pennsylvania, attended by her grandmother, former First Lady Mamie Eisenhower.

== Books ==
- Ambrose, Stephen Edward (1990). Eisenhower: Soldier and President. New York City: Simon & Schuster. ISBN 0-671-70107-X.
