= Mary Jean Eisenhower =

American humanitarian

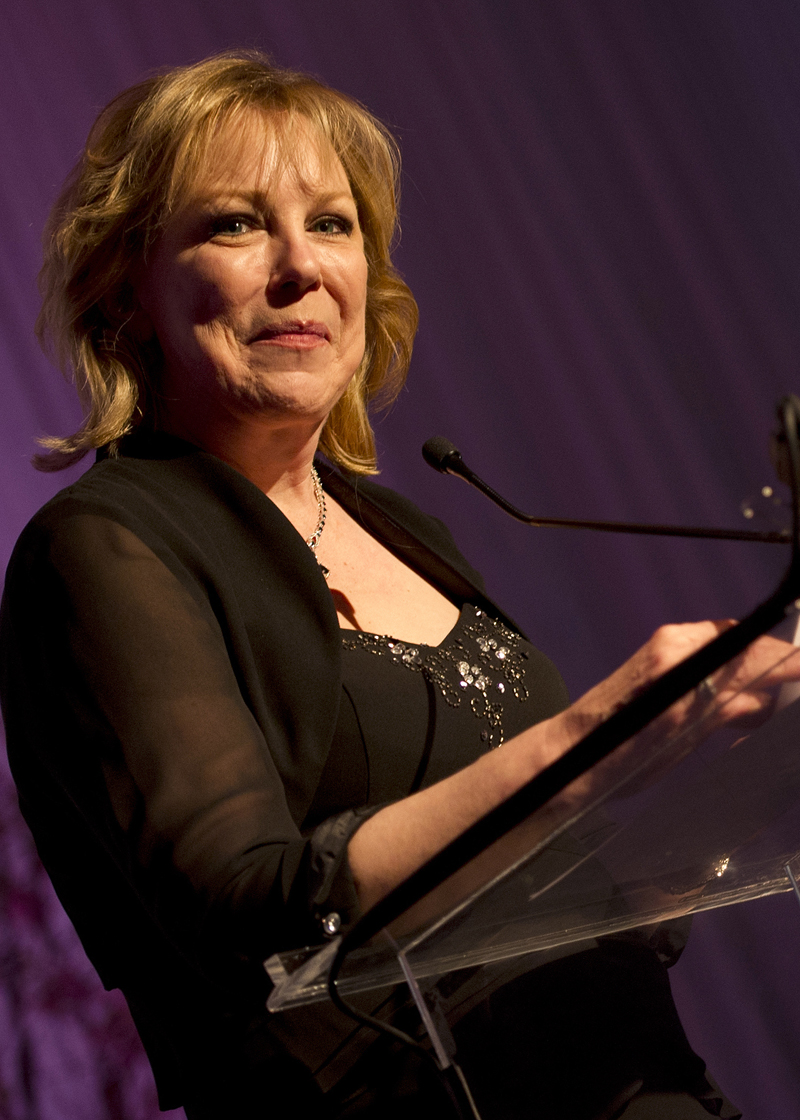
- Mary Jean Eisenhower at the Military Child of the Year Awards Gala in 2013
- Born: December 21, 1955 (age 70); Washington, D.C., U.S.
- Occupation: Chairman of People to People International
- Spouse: James Brewton Millard
- Children: 1
- Parents: John Eisenhower (father); Barbara Thompson (mother)

Mary Jean Eisenhower (born December 21, 1955) is an American humanitarian. She is the chairman emeritus, and former president and chief executive officer, of People to People International. She is a granddaughter of General Dwight D. Eisenhower, 34th President of the United States. Since 2021, Eisenhower has been the co-chair of the National First Ladies Day Commission.

Plaque commemorating Mary Jean Eisenhower renaming a pier in Bangor, County Down, N. Ireland in honour of her grandfather Dwight D. Eisenhower who reviewed ships at this place prior to D-Day.

== Early life ==
Mary Eisenhower was born in Washington, D.C., during her grandfather's first term and christened in the Blue Room of the White House. She grew up on Eisenhower estate in Gettysburg, Pennsylvania, where President Eisenhower retired after leaving office. Ms. Eisenhower attended Schuylkill Consolidated School in fifth grade and Westtown School in Pennsylvania until her father, John Eisenhower, was appointed United States Ambassador to Belgium. She lived in Belgium from 1969 to 1972. Eisenhower began her career working on Capitol Hill and then managed an engineering firm. She also has been a Fellow at Stanford University.

In 1973, Mary Jean Eisenhower was presented as a debutante to high society at the prestigious International Debutante Ball at the Waldorf-Astoria Hotel in New York City. All of her sisters and many other members of the Eisenhower family have been presented as debutantes at the International Debutante Ball.

== Work with People to People International ==
Eisenhower has worked to develop and expand the mission of People to People International. She became the chief executive officer of People to People International in January 2000 and its president in 2003. Eisenhower was chief executive officer until June 2013. She currently holds the title of chairman emeritus. In February 2016, Eisenhower resumed her position as CEO of People to People International and President in October 2016.

During her work with People to People International, Eisenhower visited Morocco to represent her family to the King on the 50th anniversary of the Casablanca Conference. She also traveled to the beaches of Normandy to meet many of the veterans who served under her grandfather during the D-Day invasion. In the last six years, Eisenhower has left United States soil over 70 times and visited over 40 countries. Missions have ranged from meeting first families to distributing foodstuffs in developing countries to cultural and humanitarian exchanges.

Inspired by an orphanage she visited in Morocco, Eisenhower launched the People to People International Friendship Fund in 1999. The Fund is designed to enable individuals to support the service-oriented facilities they visit throughout the world and to provide a mechanism through which the network of PTPI Chapters can assist one another. Today, the fund has supported causes ranging from the Global Humanitarian Eradication of Landmines, Children's Mercy Hospital in London, England, earthquake relief in India, disaster relief to victims of September 11 attacks, and their families, support of under resourced schools in China and Sri Lanka, a home for leukemia victims and their families in Cuba, to a library project in Vietnam and the Friends of Egypt organization. One hundred percent of all funds received by the International Friendship Fund are allocated in support of the projects specified by donors.

After the September 11 attacks, Eisenhower became intently focused upon bringing young people from around the globe into contact with one another in order to expose them to diverse cultures and conflict management tools that might facilitate the amelioration of long-standing disputes. Her vision came to fruition with Peace Camp 2003: An Evolution of Thought and Change and the Global Peace Initiative. Both the Peace Camp and the Global Peace Initiative brought participants from over 30 nationalities together in Egypt to discuss contemporary issues and gain nuanced insights into the varied and unique cultures represented among the participants. Suzanne Mubarak, former First Lady of Egypt, co-hosted this event.

People to People International filed for bankruptcy on March 22, 2022, in Missouri Western Bankruptcy court.

== Personal life ==
Mary Jean Eisenhower and Army 2nd Lt. James Brewton Millard married in May 1976 at a private military ceremony in Valley Forge, Pennsylvania, attended by her grandmother, former First Lady Mamie Eisenhower. Her son is Merrill Eisenhower Atwater, who became chief operations officer and then chief executive officer of People to People International in 2018.

In 2021, Eisenhower became a charter member, and was elected as a co-chairperson, of the National First Ladies Day Commission. She is a member of the Society of Presidential Descendants.

== Awards ==
Eisenhower has been awarded the Knight of Peace Award from the International University in Assisi, Italy. She also holds honorary doctorates from Schiller International University, Park University, William Jewell College, and York College, in York, Nebraska. She was awarded the Medal of Honor from the Slovak Republic as well as Friendship Ambassador from China, The Award of Excellence from the Consular Corps, Membership in the OSS Society, among others.

== Family tree ==
Dwight D. Eisenhower (1890–1969)	Mamie Doud (1896–1979)
Richard Nixon (1913–1994)	Pat Ryan (1912–1993)	Doud Eisenhower (1917–1921)	John Eisenhower (1922–2013)	Barbara Thompson (1926–2014)
Edward Cox (1946–present)	Tricia Nixon (1946–present)	Julie Nixon (1948–present)	David Eisenhower (1948–present)	Fernando; Echavarría-Uribe	Anne Eisenhower (1949–2022)	Susan Eisenhower (1951–present)	John Mahon	Mary Eisenhower (1955–present)	Ralph Atwater
Andrea Catsimatidis (1990–present)	Christopher Cox (1979–present)	Anthony Cheslock (1977–present)	Jennie Eisenhower (1978–present)	Alex Eisenhower (1980–present)	Tara Brennan (1979–present)	Melanie Eisenhower (1984–present)	Adriana Echavarria (1969–present)	Amelia Eisenhower Mahon (1981/82–present)	Merrill Eisenhower Atwater (1981–present)
