= International Debutante Ball =

Biannual ball at Waldorf Astoria hotel, New York City, US

Coordinates: 40.76518°N 73.97190°W

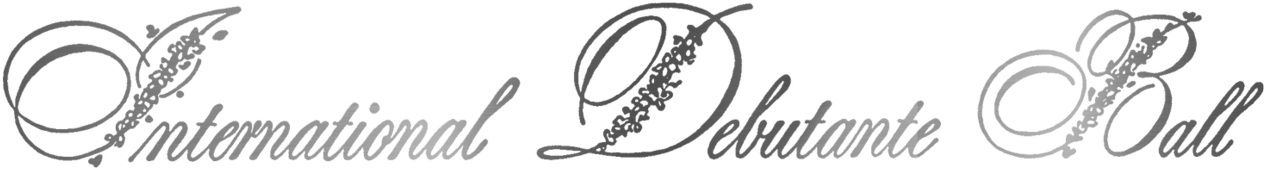
- Status: Active
- Genre: Debutante ball
- Frequency: Biennial
- Venue: Waldorf Astoria New York, Plaza Hotel, The Pierre
- Locations: New York City, New York, U.S.
- Country: United States
- Inaugurated: 1954
- Founder: Beatrice Dinsmore Joyce
- Website: internationaldebutanteball.org

The International Debutante Ball is an invitation-only, formal debutante ball, to officially present well-connected young women from upper-class families to high society. Founded in 1954, it occurs every two years in New York City.

Young women from all over the United States and from around the globe are brought together at the ball and the surrounding parties, including daughters of presidents of the United States, billionaire businessmen, diplomats, nobility, ambassadors and governors. Over the years, the ball has benefited numerous charities from the International Debutante Ball Foundation including the Soldiers', Sailors', Marines', Coast Guard and Airmen's Club of New York, a social club for members of the United States Armed Services.

The International Debutante Ball is considered one of the most prestigious debutante balls in the world.

== History ==
The International Debutante Ball was founded in 1954 by socialite, philanthropist and humanitarian Beatrice Dinsmore Joyce, who was dubbed as the 'Duchess of Debs' and the 'Grand dame of debutante balls'. Joyce was inspired to create an American debutante ball after hearing Consuelo Vanderbilt make an observation about debutante balls and how lucky girls are who travel to debutante balls in different countries. The band leader Lester Lanin played the music from the start in 1954 until his last ball in the 1990s. Every guest was given a special "lanin hat". The first balls were held at the Plaza Hotel, with 35 girls from different countries and different states. As it grew with more girls participating, it moved to the Waldorf-Astoria Hotel.

Chairmen and Vice-Chairmen of the Debutante Committee of the International Debutante Ball include or have included:

- Ivan Sergeyevich Obolensky (grandson of John Jacob Astor IV - the founder of the Waldorf-Astoria hotel who died on the RMS Titanic. Astor was the richest passenger aboard the Titanic, and was thought to be among the richest people in the world at that time)
- Barbara Anne Eisenhower (daughter of John Eisenhower, granddaughter of Dwight D. Eisenhower)
- Susan Eisenhower (daughter of John Eisenhower, granddaughter of Dwight D. Eisenhower)
- Mamie Eisenhower (First lady of the United States)
- Jacqueline Mars (Heiress of Mars Inc.)
- Duke and Duchess of Marlborough
- The Marquess of Huntly

== Format ==
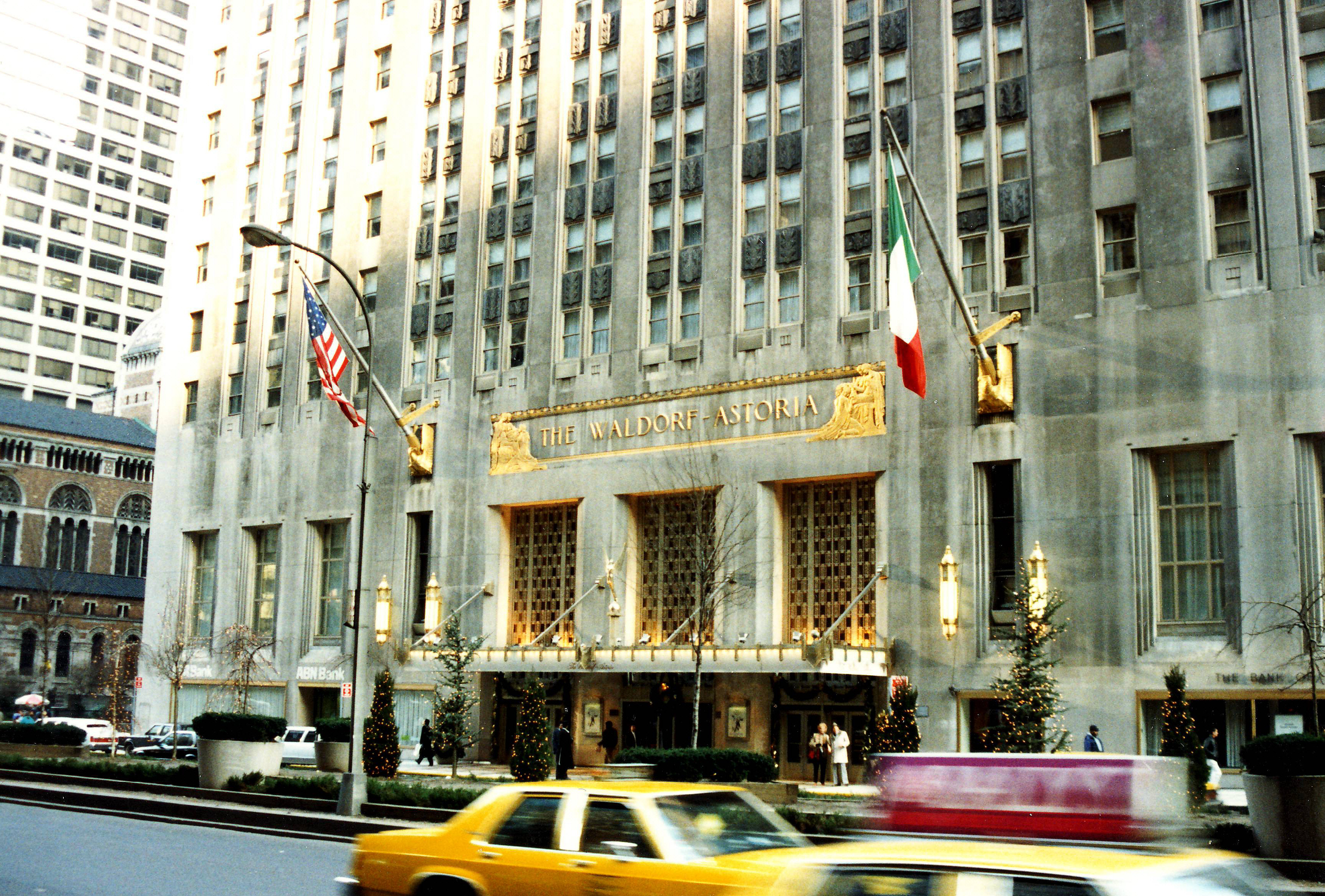
Waldorf Astoria Hotel

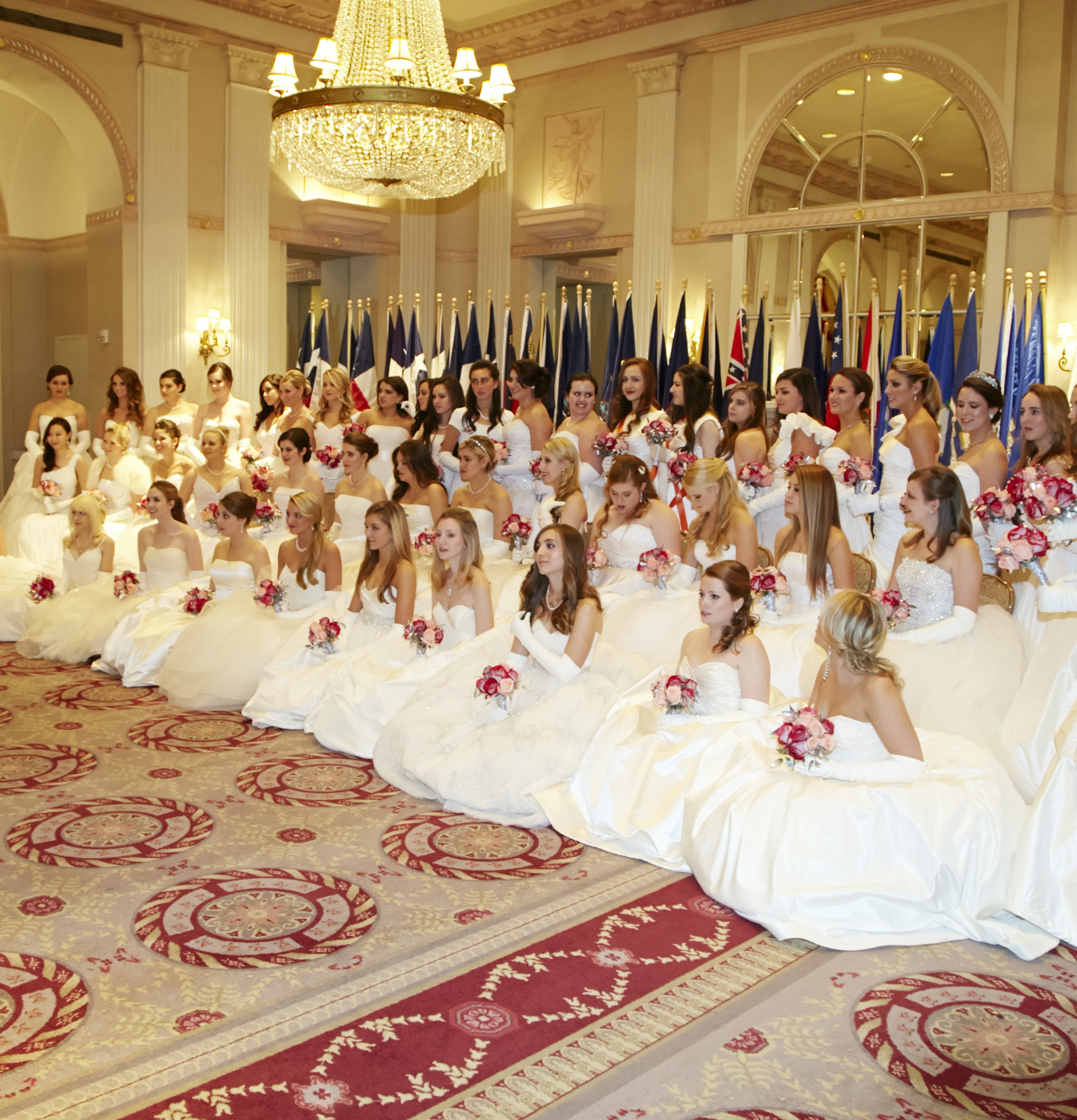
58th International Debutante Ball, 2012

The International Debutante Ball is held biennially in the Grand Ballroom of the exclusive and historical Waldorf-Astoria Hotel in New York City; although from 2016 it has been held at The Pierre in New York City due to renovations and temporary closure of the Waldorf-Astoria Hotel. Each ball is preceded by a number of events, dinners and parties for the debutantes, including the Bachelor's Brunch, in private Manhattan members-only clubs such as the Colony Club, 21 Club or the University Club of New York.

At the ball, each debutante is escorted by two men: one United States Military Academy cadet and one American civilian. According to New York magazine, the current organizer of the International Debutante Ball stated that "Every young lady should have two men." Civilian escorts of the debutantes are young men of distinction, who are often scions of distinguished families, e.g. the Rockefeller family. Each debutante represents her state or country at the International Debutante Ball and a song, e.g. a national anthem or a song associated with the country where the debutante is from, is played by the Lester Lanin Orchestra for the debutante when she is presented on stage. The military escort of the debutante also carries the flag of the country or US state where the debutante comes from. Each debutante must also greet approximately one thousand or more guests, from a close-knit social world, individually in the receiving line. Due to the fact that there are debutantes representing their own US state or country, the International Debutante Ball has been dubbed by publications as 'The United Nations of Debutante Balls and the private world of polite society'. Gold and pink are the main traditional colors of the ball. The Grand Ballroom is thus decorated with gold, silver (symbolising elegance) and pink (symbolising femininity) decorations, which Countess Bobrinskoy oversees at each ball biennially, and guests dine on edible gold leaves. The debutantes also receive flower bouquets containing pink roses and golden leaves. The dress code for civilian escorts and guests is white tie and formal wear.

The ball is considered the "ultimate networking event" where members of the world's elite, rich and powerful meet up and mingle and where their daughters are prepared to enter the world of high society and foster lifelong international friendship with each other. The pink invitation that the chosen debutantes receive is written with gold ink and is therefore sometimes jokingly called the "Golden Ticket". The International Debutante Ball has been described as a ball which "most young women nowadays will never attend" and which has largely become a "who’s who of the upper class", with daughters of US Presidents, billionaire businessmen, European royalty, US governors, and diplomats receiving invitations. The scene at the International Debutante Ball has been described as a "Gatsby-style splendour in Manhattan's Waldorf-Astoria" (referring to F. Scott Fitzgerald's The Great Gatsby).

== Qualifications and selection ==
In order to be presented as a debutante at the International Debutante Ball, debutantes must be recommended by a previous debutante of the International Debutante Ball. Debutantes must also be accepted by the Chairmen of the Debutante Committee of the International Debutante Ball and be able to afford the debutante presentation fee. Once chosen, each debutante is required to donate at least $22,000 to various charities for the US military supported by the ball.

Debutantes who are usually accepted are "women of distinction" who are highly accomplished young ladies in athletics, community service, academics, philanthropy and charity and are from well-connected families.

Chosen debutantes are usually between the ages of 17 and 21 years old. According to the current organizer of the ball, the debutantes must be well-known with connections in the New York debutante and high society and as long as 'the debutante has the right connections, she has a chance of being invited'. According to The New York Times, the organiser of the ball stated that the ball does not want any "Tootsie" to participate or join "the club". Debutantes of the International Debutante Ball have been referred to as "members of a special and very select, elite, social group and of a carefully guarded social circle" and they have also been dubbed as "high profile" and "preppy".

The debutantes include royalty, members of imperial families, heiresses, aristocrats and daughters of many political figures including Presidents of the United States, such as the daughters and granddaughters of President Dwight D. Eisenhower, President Richard Nixon, President Lyndon B. Johnson, President George H. W. Bush and President George W. Bush. Ivanka Trump (daughter of President Donald Trump) and Sasha and Malia Obama (daughters of President Barack Obama) have also been invited to be presented as debutantes at the International Debutante Ball in New York City. The International Debutante Ball has therefore been referred to as "the debutante ball with the strongest (and bipartisan) ties to the White House". Debutantes of the International Debutante Ball also include daughters of billionaire businessmen from the Forbes 400 and many Wall Street financiers.

== Notable past debutantes ==
Over the years, the International Debutante Ball has presented many notable young women to society, including, but not limited to:

- Tricia Nixon Cox, daughter of President Richard Nixon (1964)
- Princess Mary Alexis Obolensky, daughter of Prince Alexis Obolensky (1964)
- Serena Russell, daughter of Vogue Magazine editor Edwin Russell and Lady Sarah Consuelo Spencer-Churchill; great-granddaughter of Consuelo Vanderbilt (1964)
- Julie Nixon Eisenhower (1966), daughter of President Richard Nixon and granddaughter-in-law of President Dwight D. Eisenhower. Her civilian escort at the International Debutante Ball was her future husband David Eisenhower, the eponym of U.S. Presidential country retreat Camp David and the grandson of President Dwight D. Eisenhower. The song "Fortunate Son" by Creedence Clearwater Revival was based on the relationship of Julie Nixon and David Eisenhower.
- Anne Eisenhower (1967), granddaughter of President Dwight D. Eisenhower
- Vera Wang, American fashion designer (1968), At the time of her presentation, Wang explained that "the whole idea of a debutante affair is for a girl to be presented who is available for dating”. However, Wang had not formally announced her two-week-old engagement to Thomas Bermingham of Chicago and Phoenix. Wang, who was representing China at the ball, also admitted that she had never actually been to China, but that her parents had “homes in several areas in the Far East”.
- Maureen Finch, daughter of Robert Finch, the Republican 38th Lieutenant Governor of California and counsellor to President Richard Nixon (1969)
- Princess Ines de Bourbon Parme, daughter of Prince Michel of Bourbon-Parma, granddaughter of Princess Margaret of Denmark and great-granddaughter of Infanta Maria Antonia of Portugal and niece of Queen Anne of Romania (1969)
- Princess Elisabeth Sayn-Wittgenstein (1969)
- Carolyn Anne Mckenzie, daughter of the Marchioness of Donegal (1969)
- Cynthia Louise Chennault (1969), daughter of politician Chen Xiangmei (known as Anna Chennault) and the famed Lieutenant General Claire Lee Chennault who was the World War II leader of the "Flying Tigers"
- Susan Eisenhower (1970), granddaughter of President Dwight D. Eisenhower
- Lady Jane Meriel Grosvenor (1971), daughter of Robert Grosvenor, the fifth Duke of Westminster who was the richest man in Great Britain
- Hollister 'Holly' Knowlton, future wife of the United States Army General officer and director of the Central Intelligence Agency (CIA) David Petraeus (1972)
- Mary Jean Eisenhower (1973), youngest grandchild of President Dwight D. Eisenhower
- Christine Marie Colby, daughter of the director of the Central Intelligence Agency (CIA) William Colby (1978)
- Princess Katarina of Yugoslavia (1978), descendant of Queen Victoria, grand-niece of Prince Philip, Duke of Edinburgh - consort of Queen Elizabeth II
- Princess Elisabeth von Lobkowicz of Austria (1978)
- Pia des Brantes (1978), niece of the president of France, descendant of King Charles X of France
- Louise Thérèse Blouin (1978), Canadian magazine publisher.
- Cornelia Guest, goddaughter of the Duke of Windsor, daughter of the socialite C. Z. Guest and polo player Winston Frederick Churchill Guest (1982)
- Lucinda Robb, granddaughter of President Lyndon B. Johnson (1985)
- Vanessa von Bismarck (1987), great-great-granddaughter of Prince Otto von Bismarck, chancellor of the German Empire
- Madeline Cuomo (1983), daughter of the 52nd Governor of New York Mario Cuomo and sister of the 56th Governor of New York Andrew Cuomo
- Charlotte Forbes, granddaughter of Malcolm Forbes (1995)
- Catherine Forbes, granddaughter of Malcolm Forbes (1995)
- Jennie Eisenhower (1996), daughter of Julie Nixon Eisenhower (a former debutante of the International Debutante Ball) and David Eisenhower (a former civilian escort of the International Debutante Ball); and granddaughter of President Richard Nixon and great-granddaughter of President Dwight D. Eisenhower.
- Countess Elmerice von Habsburg-Lothringen (2002)
- Princess Charlotte de Broglie, niece of Louis, 7th duc de Broglie (2002)
- Francesca Forrestal (2002), granddaughter of James Forrestal, the first United States Secretary of Defense
- Countess Elizabeth Lynch de Montrichard (2002), daughter of New England philanthropist Peter Lynch, and married to Count de Montrichard who was her civilian escort at the International Debutante Ball
- Alaina Bentley (2002), heiress of the exclusive British car manufacturer Bentley Motors
- Marie Abigaëlle Trudeau (2006), niece of Canadian Prime Minister Pierre Trudeau
- Ashley Walker Bush, granddaughter of President George H. W. Bush and niece of President George W. Bush (2006)
- Princess Natalya Elisabeth Davidovna Obolensky (2006)
- Countess Magdalena Habsburg-Lothringen, great-great-granddaughter of Empress Elisabeth 'Sisi' of Austria and member of the Imperial Habsburg family of the Holy Roman Empire (2006)
- Lady Henrietta Seymour, daughter of Duke and Duchess of Somerset, relative of Henry VIII's wife Jane Seymour (2006)
- Pélagie de Macmahon, great-great-granddaughter of Patrice de MacMahon, Duke of Magenta and President of France (2008)
- Christina Huffington, daughter of Arianna Huffington and Michael Huffington of the Huffington Post (2008)
- Princess Aurelia of Liechtenstein (2018)

Other debutantes of the International Debutante Ball have included members of prominent American and international families, including:

- The Astor family
- The Mars family
- The Rockefeller family
- The Vanderbilt family
- The princely Bismarck family
- The royal Bourbon-Parma family
- The imperial Habsburg-Lorraine family (which formerly ruled the Holy Roman Empire and Austria-Hungary)
- The ducal Spencer-Churchill family

== Impact ==
Debutantes of the International Debutante Ball have been dubbed as 'Blue Blooded Socialites', 'the crème de la crème of young women' and 'the next it girls' by the media and 'The luckiest girls in the world' by the New York Observer. The International Debutante Ball has also been dubbed as 'the ultimate debutante ball for young society ladies of distinction' presenting the next generation of eligible accomplished socialites. The debutantes have also been referred to as the "Real Gossip Girls" referring to the TV series Gossip Girl about rich upper-class young women from the Upper East Side of New York City. According to Gotham magazine, the International Debutante Ball is the "Ball of the Deb Season" where the "well-heeled of the world" head to. The International Debutante Ball serves as a charity benefit, with money collected benefiting a variety of charities over the years. Chief among the beneficiaries is the Soldiers', Sailors', Coast Guards', Marines' and Airmen's Club of Manhattan, which provides a home away from home for men and women of the United States Armed Services.

== Cultural references ==
The International Debutante Ball has been the topic of several media, both fiction and non-fiction.

Books

- Cornelia Guest, The Debutante's Guide to Life (1986)
- Ward Morehouse, Inside the Plaza: An Intimate Portrait of the Ultimate Hotel (2001)
- Kimberly Schlegel, The Pleasure of Your company: Entertaining in High Style (2004)
- Lucy Kavaler, The Private World of High Society: Its Rule and Rituals (2011)
- Diana Oswald, Oscar de la Renta and David P. Columbia, Debutantes: When Glamour Was Born (2013)

Movies

- Metropolitan (1990), an Oscar nominated film directed by Whit Stillman depicting the lives of the young, upper-class elites (the "Urban Haute Bourgeoisie") during debutante ball season in New York City. The International Debutante Ball is one of the balls in the movie.
- Beauty and the Beast (2017) - starring Emma Watson, the director Bill Condon has referred to the International Debutante Ball for the Grand Ball scene in the movie.

== See also ==
- List of debutante balls in the United States
- High society (social class)
- Sloane Ranger
- Social Register
- White Anglo-Saxon Protestants
