= Susan Eisenhower =

American writer (born 1951)

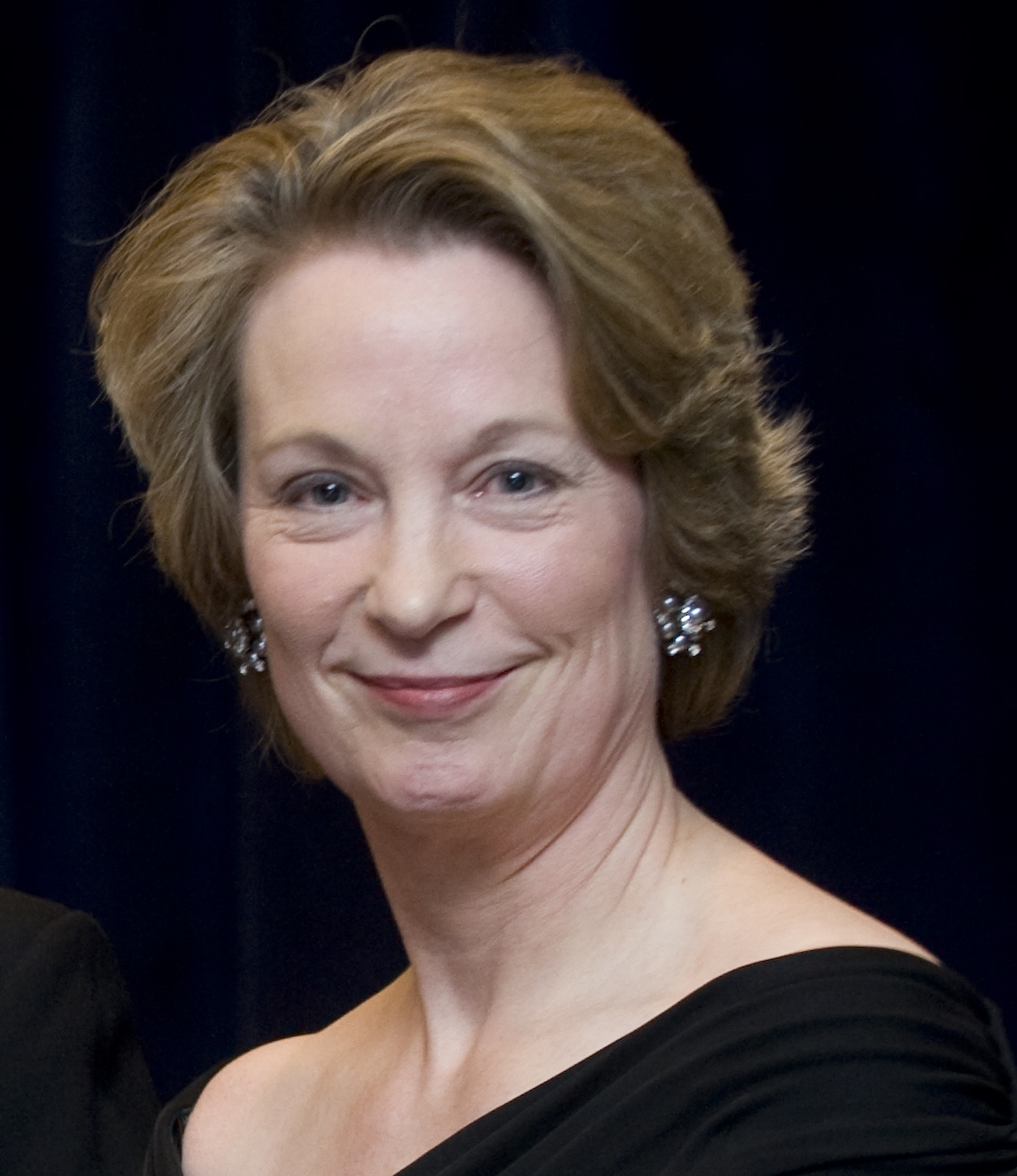
- Eisenhower in 2009
- Born: Susan Elaine Eisenhower; December 31, 1951 (age 74)
- Political party: Republican (before 2008) Independent (2008–present)
- Spouses: Alexander H. Bradshaw (m. c. 1973; div. c. 1980); John Mahon (m. 1980; div. 1983) Roald Sagdeev (m. 1991; div. 2007)
- Children: 3
- Parents: John Eisenhower (father); Barbara Thompson (mother)

Susan Elaine Eisenhower (born December 31, 1951) is an American consultant, author, and expert on international security, space policy, energy, and relations between the Russian Federation and the United States of America. She is the daughter of John Eisenhower and the granddaughter of President Dwight D. Eisenhower.

== Early life ==
Eisenhower is the daughter of John Eisenhower and the granddaughter of Dwight D. Eisenhower. In 1970, following family tradition, she was presented as a debutante to high society at the International Debutante Ball at the Waldorf-Astoria Hotel in New York City.

== Career ==
Eisenhower is President of the Eisenhower Group, Inc, which provides strategic counsel on political, business, and public affairs projects. She has consulted for Fortune 100 and Fortune 500 companies doing business in the emerging markets of the former Soviet Union and for a number of major institutions engaged in the energy field.

She is also Chairman of Leadership and Public Policy Programs and Chairman Emeritus of the Eisenhower Institute, a think tank based in Washington, D.C., and in Gettysburg, Pennsylvania, owned and operated by Gettysburg College. She was the president of the Eisenhower Institute twice, and later its chairman. During that time, she became known for her work in the former Soviet Union and in the energy field.

In January 2010, Secretary of Energy Steven Chu appointed Eisenhower to the Blue Ribbon Commission on America's Nuclear Future, which has been asked to develop a long-term solution for safely managing the back end of the nuclear fuel cycle.

Over the years, she has been on many other government task forces. In 2000, she was appointed by United States Secretary of Energy Bill Richardson to the Baker-Cutler Commission, a blue-ribbon task force, to evaluate U.S.-funded nonproliferation programs in Russia. Since that time, she has also was an advisor on two other United States Department of Energy studies; one on the threat of nuclear terrorism and the other a blue-ribbon panel on the future of nuclear energy. In 2001, after two terms on the NASA Advisory Council, she was appointed to the International Space Station Management and Cost Evaluation Task Force, which analyzed International Space Station management and cost overruns. She currently sits on the Nuclear Threat Initiative board, co-chaired by Senator Sam Nunn and Ted Turner, the Energy Future Coalition, the US Chamber of Commerce's new Institute for 21st Century Energy, and the Air Force Academy's Eisenhower Center for Space and Defense Studies.

In academia, she is an External Advisory Board Member of the MIT Energy Initiative. She has also been an Academic Fellow of the International Peace and Security program of the Carnegie Corporation of New York, as director of the Carnegie Endowment for International Peace, and as an advisor to Johns Hopkins' Nitze School of Advance International Studies.

Eisenhower testified before the Senate Armed Services and Senate Budget Committees on policy toward Russia and the former Soviet Union. She was also appointed to the National Academy of Sciences' standing Committee on International Security and Arms Control, where she served for eight years.

Eisenhower is also active in the corporate world, on the advisory boards of Thorium Power, IxReveal, and Foolproof. She is also a Senior Director of Stonebridge International, a Washington-based international consulting firm headed by former national Security Advisor Samuel "Sandy" Berger and former Senator Warren Rudman.

She has provided analysis for CNN International, MSNBC, The Situation Room with Wolf Blitzer, Fox News, The Newshour with Jim Lehrer, Hardball with Chris Matthews, One on One with John McLaughlin, the BBC, and three network morning programs. Over the years, she has appeared on many other programs, including Nightline, World News Tonight with Peter Jennings, This Week with David Brinkley, and CBS Sunday Morning with Charles Kuralt.

She has spoken at diverse gatherings such as Harvard University, World Affairs Councils, and corporate gatherings. She has also spoken to many expert audiences. For instance, she gave the Commandant's Lecture at the Army War College in Carlisle, the Harry S. Truman Distinguished Lecture at Sandia National Laboratory, and she delivered the 2008 Rose Lecture at MIT. She has also given full speeches at other prominent places, such as the National Press Club, the Smithsonian Institution, the National Archives, the Hollywood Bowl, the French National Assembly, the Rotunda of the Capitol, and the White House.

Eisenhower has also been seen as a "talking head" on television programs and documentaries, including Oliver North's War Stories, Why We Fight and, most recently, Sputnik Mania.

She has received four honorary doctorates, including from the Monterey Institute, where she was cited for her work on nuclear nonproliferation. She received the 2008 Dolibois History Prize from Miami University. She was a keynote speaker at the 2012 Washington & Jefferson College Energy Summit, where the Washington & Jefferson College Energy Index was unveiled.

== Publications ==
External videos
- Booknotes interview with Eisenhower on Breaking Free, October 8, 1995, C-SPAN
- Presentation by Eisenhower on Mrs. Ike, November 7, 1996, C-SPAN

Eisenhower has written extensively on nuclear and space issues. She is the author of four books: Breaking Free: A Memoir of Love; Mrs. Ike: Memories and Reflections on the Life of Mamie Eisenhower; Partners in Space: US-Russian Cooperation After the Cold War and How Ike Led. She has co-authored The Making of a Soviet Scientist with Roald Sagdeev. She has also edited four books on regional security issues; the most recent – Partners in Space (2004) – was also published by Nayuk, the publishing house of the Russian Academy of Sciences. In 2000, she co-edited a book, Islam and Central Asia: An Enduring Legacy or an Evolving Threat? She has written chapters for a number of collected volumes, and penned hundreds of op-eds and articles on foreign and domestic policy for the Washington Post, Los Angeles Times, United States Naval Institute's Proceedings, The Spectator, the National Interest, Politique Americaine, USA Today and other Gannett Newspapers.

She also maintains a blog on her website, addressing various issues in foreign and domestic policy, national security, and politics.

== Endorsement of Barack Obama ==
Although a lifelong member of the Republican Party, Eisenhower endorsed Barack Obama for president of the United States in 2008. She announced on August 21, 2008, that she was leaving the Republican Party and becoming an independent. She spoke on the final day of the 2008 Democratic National Convention. Her speech began with, "I stand before you tonight not as a Republican or a Democrat, but as an American."

On October 29, 2012, she re-endorsed Barack Obama for a second term in the 2012 presidential election.

Since leaving the Republican Party, she has described herself as "an Eisenhower Republican". Her father, John Eisenhower, had similarly left their family's traditional party in 2004 to become an independent; he endorsed Democratic candidate Senator John Kerry for president in 2004.

== Dwight Eisenhower Memorial controversy ==
Along with the rest of her family, Eisenhower has stated her opposition to architect Frank Gehry's proposed design for the Dwight D. Eisenhower Memorial. She objects to its size, arguing that it is ecologically unsustainable, to the negative symbolism associated with the 80-foot-high metal curtains, and to the design's overall depiction of former President Eisenhower as a young boy rather than a man. In her testimony to Congress on the matter, she said, "The Eisenhower Memorial can and should be a reflection, not only of Eisenhower's lifetime achievements, and the challenging and dangerous times in which he led us; it should also be anthem to our national purpose."

== Personal life ==
Eisenhower has been married three times. Her first husband was Alexander H. Bradshaw, a London barrister. They have two daughters, Laura Magdalene Eisenhower and Caroline Eisenhower Bradshaw. Then she married John Mahon, an American lawyer, with whom she had a daughter, Amelia Eisenhower Mahon. Her third marriage was to Russian space scientist Roald Sagdeev, formerly the director of the Russian Space Research Institute.

== Family tree ==
Dwight D. Eisenhower (1890–1969)	Mamie Doud (1896–1979)
Richard Nixon (1913–1994)	Pat Ryan (1912–1993)	Doud Eisenhower (1917–1921)	John Eisenhower (1922–2013)	Barbara Thompson (1926–2014)
Edward Cox (1946–present)	Tricia Nixon (1946–present)	Julie Nixon (1948–present)	David Eisenhower (1948–present)	Fernando; Echavarría-Uribe	Anne Eisenhower (1949–2022)	Susan Eisenhower (1951–present)	John Mahon	Mary Eisenhower (1955–present)	Ralph Atwater
Andrea Catsimatidis (1990–present)	Christopher Cox (1979–present)	Anthony Cheslock (1977–present)	Jennie Eisenhower (1978–present)	Alex Eisenhower (1980–present)	Tara Brennan (1979–present)	Melanie Eisenhower (1984–present)	Adriana Echavarria (1969–present)	Amelia Eisenhower Mahon (1981/82–present)	Merrill Eisenhower Atwater (1981–present)

== See also ==
- Obama Republicans (disambiguation)
