= Anne Eisenhower =

American interior designer (1949–2022)

- Born: May 30, 1949; West Point, New York, U.S.
- Died: July 30, 2022 (aged 73); New York, U.S.
- Occupation: Interior designer
- Spouse(s): Fernando Echavarría-Uribe (m. 1968) Wolfgang Flöttl (divorced 2018)
- Children: 1
- Father: John Eisenhower
- Relatives: Dwight D. Eisenhower (grandfather)

Barbara Anne Eisenhower (May 30, 1949 – July 30, 2022) was an American interior designer based in New York City.

== Early life ==
On May 30, 1949, Eisenhower was born in West Point, New York. Eisenhower's father was John Eisenhower, a U.S. military historian and a U.S. diplomat. Eisenhower's mother was Barbara Jean (née Thompson) Eisenhower. Eisenhower's grandfather was General Dwight D. Eisenhower, 34th President of the United States.

== Personal life ==
Eisenhower's first husband was Fernando Echavarría-Uribe, an insurance executive from Bogotá, Colombia, whom she met while vacationing in South America in 1966. They married in November 1968, and six months later had a daughter, Adriana Echavarría (born May 29, 1969). Adriana was the first great-grandchild of President Eisenhower; she was born two months after his death. Adriana became a photographer, and was married for a time to Eduardo Mendoza de la Torre, the ex vice minister of justice in Colombia and later a vice president of Avianca airlines, who was the only man to have ever testified against the notorious drug lord Pablo Escobar.

Anne Eisenhower was presented at the International Debutante Ball at the Waldorf-Astoria Hotel in New York City in 1967.

In the 1980s, Eisenhower married Wolfgang Flöttl, a hedge-fund manager. Both were figures in the New York charity circuit. Eisenhower filed for divorce from Flöttl in 2018.

In 2019 Eisenhower was living in Manhattan's Upper East Side. She sold the historic Southampton mansion, Claverack, for $35 million in 2010.

== Death ==
Eisenhower died on July 30, 2022, in New York, aged 73.

Dwight D. Eisenhower (1890–1969)	Mamie Doud (1896–1979)
Richard Nixon (1913–1994)	Pat Ryan (1912–1993)	Doud Eisenhower (1917–1921)	John Eisenhower (1922–2013)	Barbara Thompson (1926–2014)
Edward Cox (1946–present)	Tricia Nixon (1946–present)	Julie Nixon (1948–present)	David Eisenhower (1948–present)	Fernando; Echavarría-Uribe	Anne Eisenhower (1949–2022)	Susan Eisenhower (1951–present)	John Mahon	Mary Eisenhower (1955–present)	Ralph Atwater
Andrea Catsimatidis (1990–present)	Christopher Cox (1979–present)	Anthony Cheslock (1977–present)	Jennie Eisenhower (1978–present)	Alex Eisenhower (1980–present)	Tara Brennan (1979–present)	Melanie Eisenhower (1984–present)	Adriana Echavarria (1969–present)	Amelia Eisenhower Mahon (1981/82–present)	Merrill Eisenhower Atwater (1981–present)
