= John Eisenhower =

United States Army general, military historian, diplomat (1922–2013)

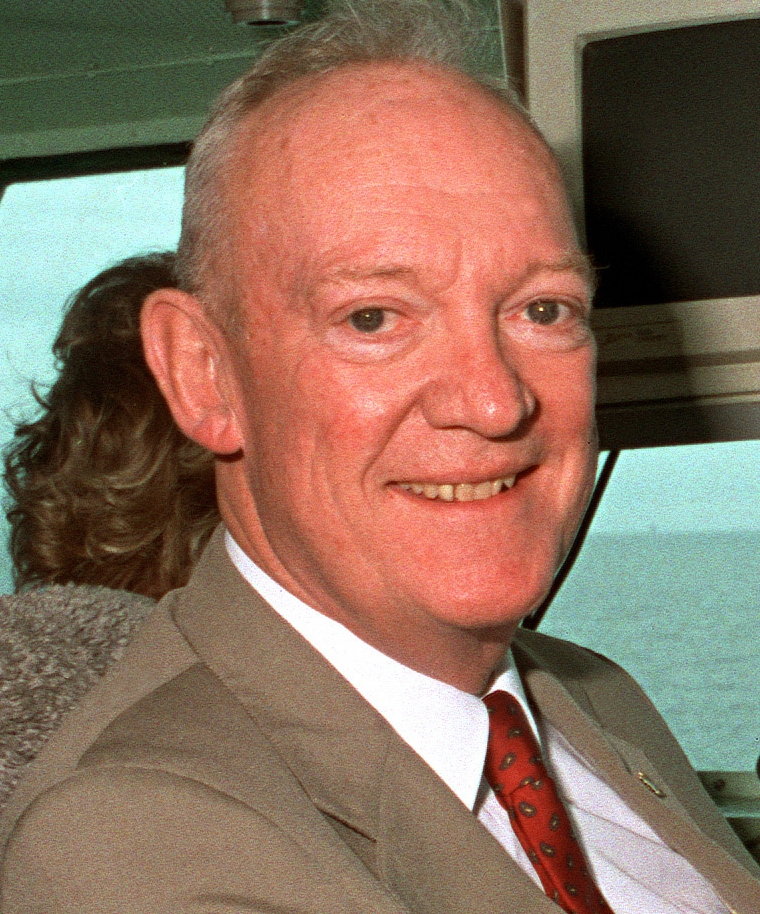
- Eisenhower in 1990

45th United States Ambassador to Belgium
- In office May 14, 1969 – September 28, 1971
- President: Richard Nixon
- Preceded by: Ridgway B. Knight
- Succeeded by: Robert Strausz-Hupe

Personal details
- Born: John Sheldon Doud Eisenhower; August 3, 1922 Denver, Colorado, U.S.
- Died: December 21, 2013 (aged 91) Trappe, Maryland, U.S.
- Resting place: West Point Cemetery
- Party: Republican
- Spouses: Barbara Thompson (m. 1947; div. 1986) Joanne Thompson (m. 1988)
- Children: David; Anne; Susan; Mary
- Parents: Dwight D. Eisenhower; Mamie Doud
- Education: United States Military Academy (BS); Columbia University (MA); United States Army Command and General Staff College (MMAS)

Military service
- Branch/service: United States Army
- Years of service: 1944–1963 (active); 1963–1974 (reserve)
- Rank: Brigadier general
- Commands: Company D, 1st Battalion, 5th Infantry Regiment; Company D, 1st Battalion, 16th Infantry Regiment; 1st Battalion, 30th Infantry Regiment
- Battles/wars: World War II; Korean War
- Awards: Bronze Star Medal; Army Commendation Medal; See more

John Sheldon Doud Eisenhower (August 3, 1922 – December 21, 2013) was a United States Army officer, diplomat, and military historian. He was the second son of President Dwight D. Eisenhower and First Lady Mamie Eisenhower. His military career spanned from before, during, and after his father's presidency, and he left active duty in 1963 and then retired in 1974. From 1969 to 1971, Eisenhower served as United States Ambassador to Belgium during the Presidency of Richard Nixon, who was previously his father's vice president. Richard Nixon was also father-in-law to Eisenhower's son David.

== Early life and education ==
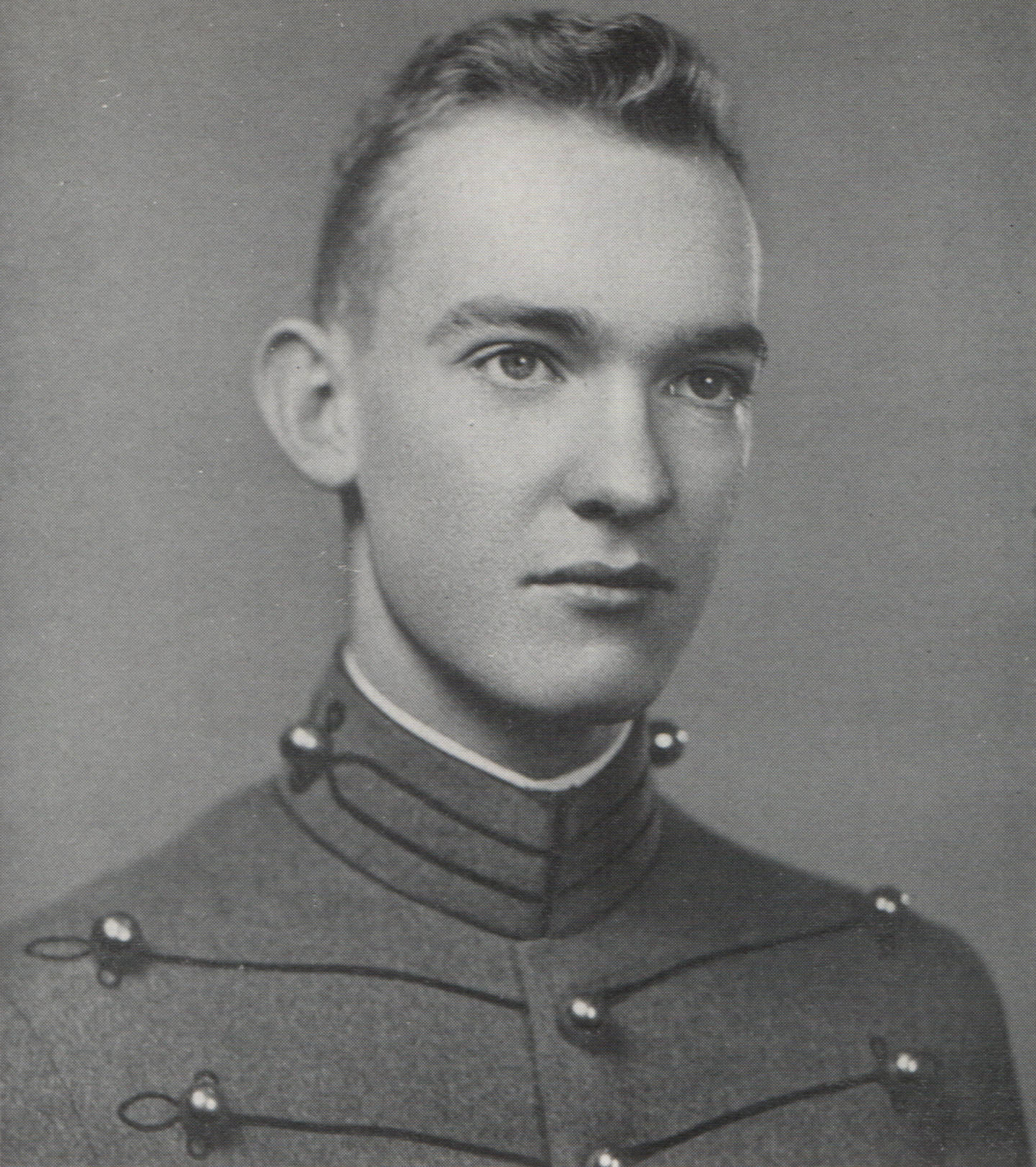
Eisenhower as a United States Military Academy cadet c. 1944

John Sheldon Doud Eisenhower was born on August 3, 1922, at Denver General Hospital in Denver, Colorado, to future U.S. President and United States Army General of the Army Dwight D. Eisenhower and future First Lady Mamie Doud; he was their second child. Their elder son, Doud, known affectionately as "Icky", died in 1921, at age three, after contracting scarlet fever. Eisenhower, like his father, attended the United States Military Academy, graduating on June 6, 1944, the day of the Normandy landings, which his father was commanding. He later earned an M.A. degree in English and comparative literature from Columbia University in 1950, and taught in the English Department at West Point from 1948 to 1951. Eisenhower graduated from the Army Command and General Staff College in 1955.

== Military career ==
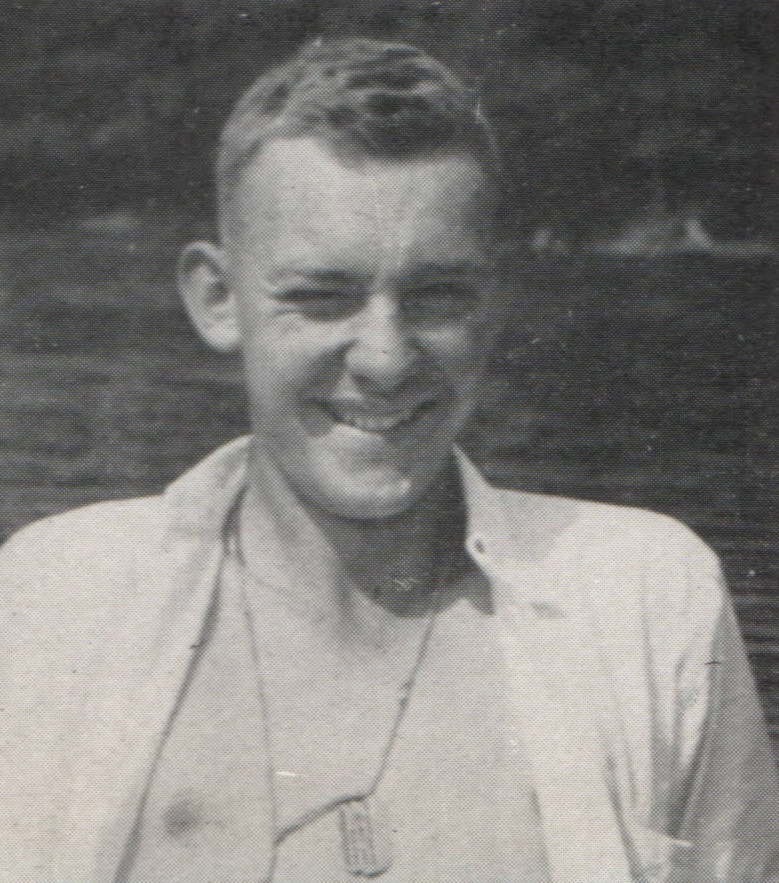
Eisenhower c. 1944

Eisenhower served in the U.S. Army during World War II and the Korean War, remaining on active duty until 1963; then serving in the U.S. Army Reserve until retirement in 1975 – attaining the rank of brigadier general. A decorated soldier, Eisenhower found his World War II military career thwarted by fears for his safety and concern from the top brass that his death or capture would be a distraction to his father, the Supreme Allied Commander. During World War II, he was assigned to intelligence and administrative duties. This issue arose again in 1952 when Major Eisenhower was assigned to fight in a combat unit in Korea while his father ran for president. But unlike World War II, John was able to see combat in Korea. After seeing combat with an infantry battalion, he was reassigned to the 3rd Division headquarters.

== Government career ==
During his father's presidency, Eisenhower served as assistant staff secretary in the White House, on the Army's general staff, and in the White House as assistant to General Andrew Goodpaster.

In the administration of President Richard Nixon, who had been his father's vice president, he served as U.S. Ambassador to Belgium from 1969 to 1971. In 1972, President Nixon appointed Eisenhower chairman of the Interagency Classification Review Committee. In 1975, he served President Gerald Ford as chairman of the President's Advisory Committee on Refugees.

== Later life and writing ==
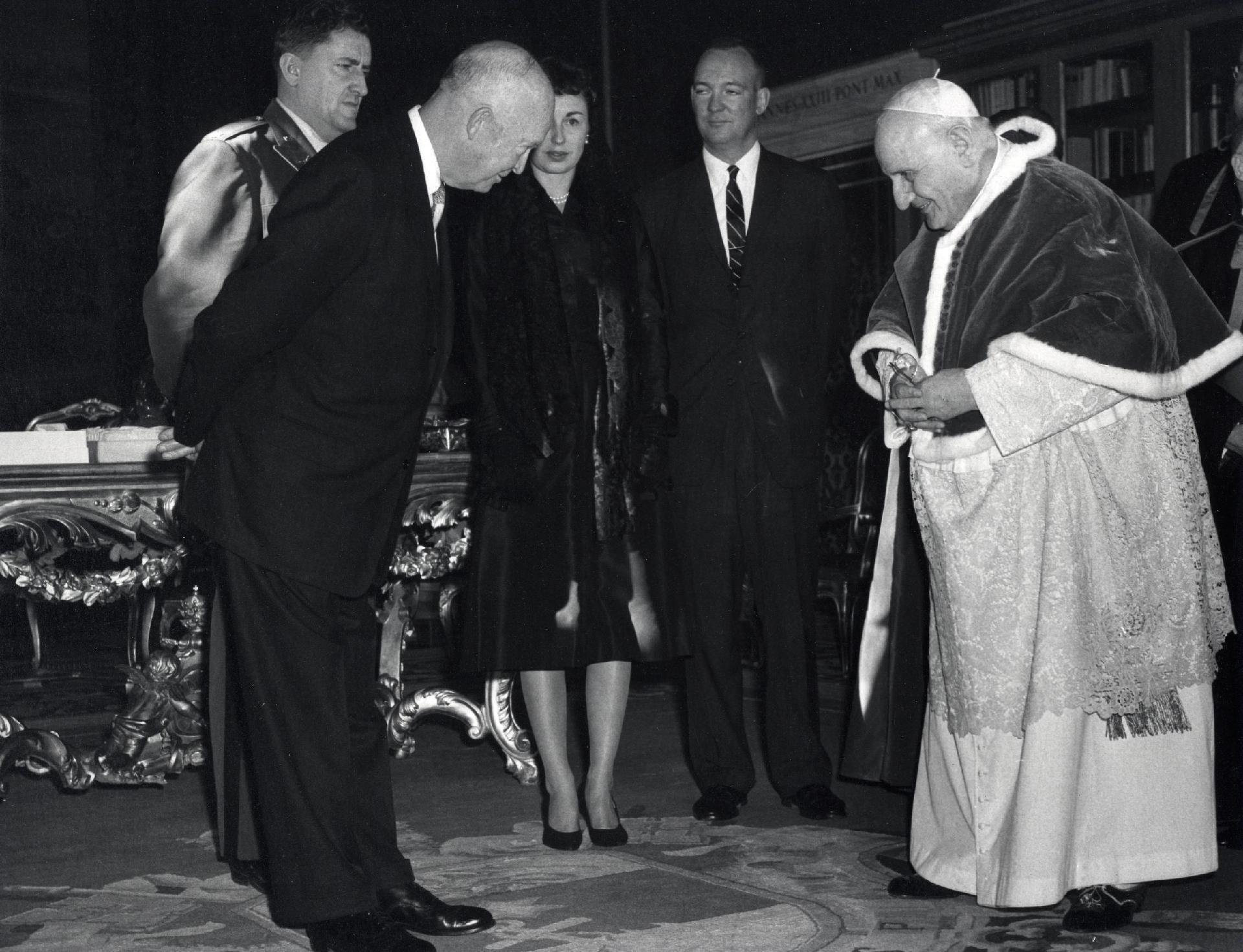
Eisenhower with his father and wife (left) and Pope John XXIII in 1959

As a military historian, Eisenhower wrote several books, including The Bitter Woods, a study of the Battle of the Bulge, and So Far from God, a history of the Mexican–American War. In a New York Times review of the latter, historian Stephen W. Sears remarked that Eisenhower "writes briskly and authoritatively, and his judgments are worth reading." Eisenhower wrote Zachary Taylor: The American Presidents Series: The 12th President, 1849–1850 (2008). He also wrote the forewords to Borrowed Soldiers, by Mitchell Yockelson of the U.S. National Archives, and to Kenneth W. Rendell's Politics, War and Personality: 50 Iconic Documents of World War II.

In later years, he had been an opponent of Frank Gehry's proposed design for the National Dwight D. Eisenhower Memorial, which he said was "too extravagant" and "attempts to do too much."

=== Presidential elections ===
A lifelong Republican, Eisenhower voted for Democrat John Kerry in the 2004 Presidential election, citing dissatisfaction with Republican incumbent George W. Bush's management of U.S. foreign policy.

During the 2008 presidential election, in which presidential candidate John McCain and vice presidential candidates Sarah Palin and Joe Biden all had children serving in the armed forces, Eisenhower wrote about his wartime experience as the son of a sitting president in a cautionary opinion piece in The New York Times titled "Presidential Children Don't Belong in Battle".

=== Death ===
Eisenhower died in Trappe, Maryland, on December 21, 2013. From the death of Elizabeth Ann Blaesing in 2005 until his own death, Eisenhower was the oldest living presidential child; on his death that distinction passed to Lynda Bird Johnson, who still holds it as of 2026. His burial was at West Point Cemetery on the grounds of the United States Military Academy.

== Marriage and children ==
Eisenhower married Barbara Jean Thompson on June 10, 1947. The couple had four children:

- Dwight David Eisenhower II (b. 1948, West Point, New York), who married Julie Nixon, herself a presidential daughter;
- Barbara Anne Eisenhower (1949–2022, born in West Point, New York);
- Susan Elaine Eisenhower (b. 1951, Fort Knox, Kentucky);
- Mary Jean Eisenhower (b. 1955, Washington, D.C.).

All of his daughters were presented as debutantes to high society at the prestigious International Debutante Ball at the Waldorf-Astoria Hotel in New York City.

John and Barbara divorced in 1986 after thirty-nine years of marriage. In 1988, Barbara married widower Edwin J. Foltz, a former vice president at Campbell's. She died on September 19, 2014, in Gladwyne, Montgomery County, Pennsylvania.

In 1988, Eisenhower married Joanne Thompson. He lived in Trappe, Maryland, after moving there from Kimberton, Pennsylvania.

== Military awards and decorations ==
U.S. military decorations
Bronze Star Medal
Army Commendation Medal
U.S. service medals
American Defense Service Medal
American Campaign Medal
European-African-Middle Eastern Campaign Medal w/ 2 bronze service stars
World War II Victory Medal
Army of Occupation Medal w/ "Germany" Clasp
National Defense Service Medal second award
Korean Service Medal w/ 3 bronze service stars
Foreign unit awards
Republic of Korea Presidential Unit Citation
Non-U.S. service awards
United Nations Service Medal
Republic of Korea War Service Medal
U.S. Army badges
Combat Infantryman Badge
Glider Badge

== Other honors ==
The city of Marshfield, Missouri, chose Eisenhower as a 2008 honoree of the Edwin P. Hubble Medal of Initiative. His grandson, Merrill Eisenhower Atwater, spoke on his behalf at Marshfield's annual Cherry Blossom Festival. The medal recognizes individuals who demonstrate great initiative in their chosen field.

== Dates of rank ==
Insignia	Rank	Component	Date
	Second lieutenant	Regular Army	June 6, 1944
	First lieutenant	Army of the United States	January 23, 1945
	Captain	Army of the United States	March 16, 1946
	First lieutenant	Regular Army	June 6, 1947
	Captain	Regular Army	May 14, 1951
	Major	Army of the United States	August 16, 1951
	Major	Regular Army	September 4, 1957
	Lieutenant colonel	Army of the United States	May 31, 1960
	Lieutenant colonel	Army Reserve	July 1, 1963
	Colonel	Army Reserve	July 1, 1967
	Brigadier general	Army Reserve	July 29, 1970
	Brigadier general	Retired	August 31, 1975

== Family tree ==
Dwight D. Eisenhower (1890–1969)	Mamie Doud (1896–1979)
Richard Nixon (1913–1994)	Pat Ryan (1912–1993)	Doud Eisenhower (1917–1921)	John Eisenhower (1922–2013)	Barbara Thompson (1926–2014)
Edward Cox (1946–present)	Tricia Nixon (1946–present)	Julie Nixon (1948–present)	David Eisenhower (1948–present)	Fernando; Echavarría-Uribe	Anne Eisenhower (1949–2022)	Susan Eisenhower (1951–present)	John Mahon	Mary Eisenhower (1955–present)	Ralph Atwater
Andrea Catsimatidis (1990–present)	Christopher Cox (1979–present)	Anthony Cheslock (1977–present)	Jennie Eisenhower (1978–present)	Alex Eisenhower (1980–present)	Tara Brennan (1979–present)	Melanie Eisenhower (1984–present)	Adriana Echavarria (1969–present)	Amelia Eisenhower Mahon (1981/82–present)	Merrill Eisenhower Atwater (1981–present)

== Bibliography ==
Title	Year	ISBN	Publisher	Subject matter	Interviews, presentations, and reviews	Comments
The Bitter Woods	1969	ISBN 9780898391060	Battery Classics	Battle of the Bulge		The original subtitle was The Bitter Woods: The Dramatic Story, Told At All Echelons – From Supreme Command to Squad Leader – of the Crisis That Shock the Western Coalition: Hilter's Surprise Ardennes Offensive; In a 1995 edition, the subtitle was simplified to The Battle of the Bulge.
Strictly Personal: A Memoir	1974	ISBN 9780385070713	Doubleday			
Allies, Pearl Harbor to D–Day	1982	ISBN 9780385114790	Doubleday	United Kingdom–United States relations in World War II		
So Far from God: The U.S. War with Mexico, 1846–1848	1989	ISBN 9780394560519	Random House	Mexican–American War		
Intervention!: The United States Involvement in the Mexican Revolution, 1913–1917	1993	ISBN 9780393313185	W. W. Norton & Company	United States involvement in the Mexican Revolution		
Agent of Destiny: The Life and Times of General Winfield Scott	1997	ISBN 9780684844510	Free Press	Winfield Scott	Booknotes interview with Eisenhower on Agent of Destiny: The Life and Times of General Winfield Scott, April 19, 1998.	
Yanks: The Epic Story of the American Army in World War I	2001	ISBN 9780743216371	Simon and Schuster	United States in World War I, American Expeditionary Forces		
General Ike: A Personal Reminiscence	2003	ISBN 9780743255721	Simon and Schuster	Dwight D. Eisenhower		
Zachary Taylor	2008	ISBN 9780805082371	Macmillan	Zachary Taylor		
Soldiers and Statesmen: Reflections on Leadership	2012	ISBN 9780826219701	University of Missouri Press	Winston Churchill, John Foster Dulles, Harry S. Truman, Mark Wayne Clark, George S. Patton Jr., Terry Allen and Theodore Roosevelt Jr., Douglas MacArthur, Omar Nelson Bradley, and Matthew B. Ridgeway		

== See also ==
Diplomatic posts
Preceded by Ridgway B. Knight	United States Ambassador to Belgium; 1969–1971	Succeeded by Robert Strausz-Hupé
