= Roald Sagdeev =

Russian physicist (born 1932)

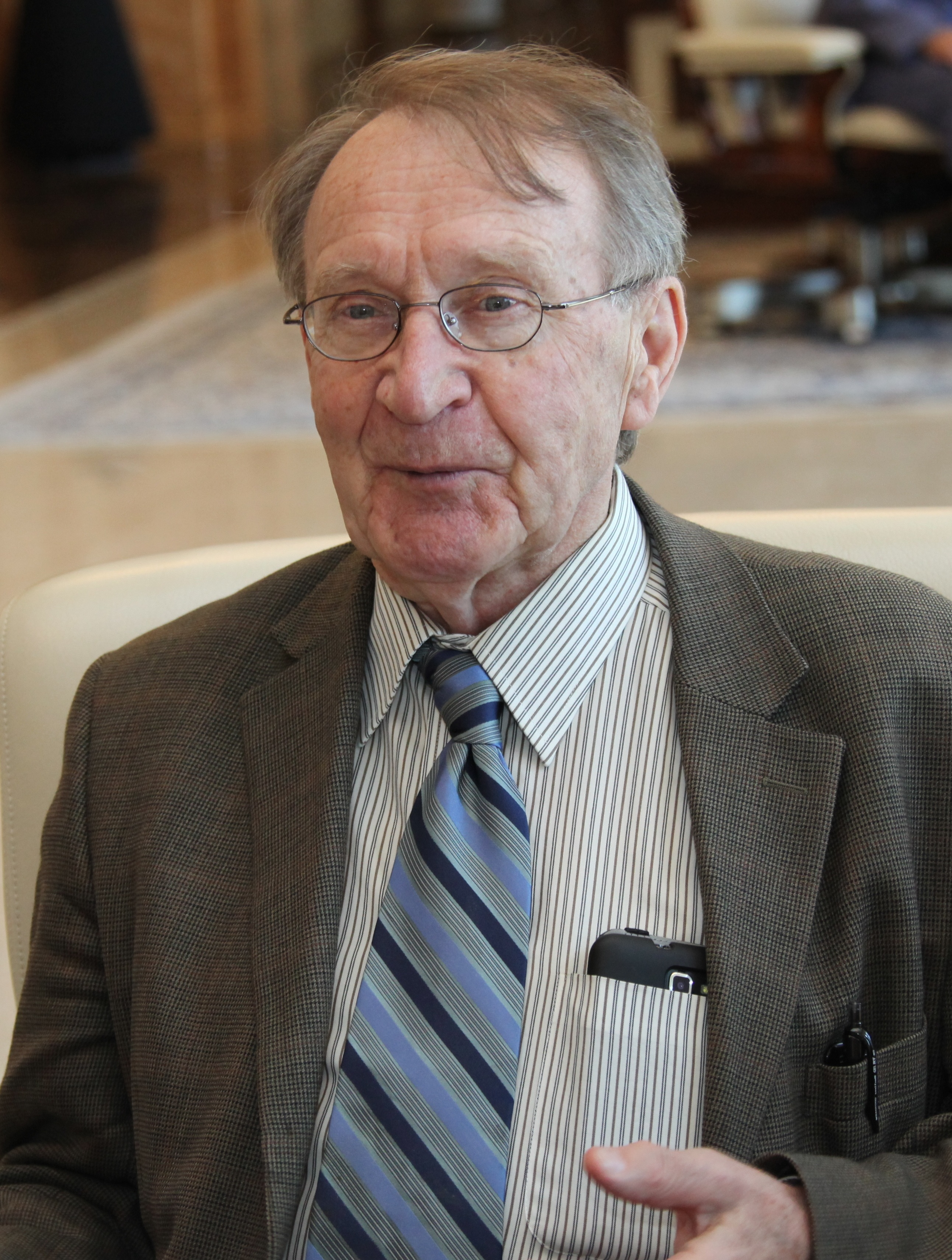
- Born: Roald Zinnurovich Sagdeev; December 26, 1932 (age 93); Moscow, Russia SFSR, Soviet Union
- Education: Moscow State University
- Known for: Plasma physics
- Spouses: Susan Eisenhower (m. 1990; div. 2007) Elena Popova (m. 2024)
- Awards: Lenin Prize (1984); Hero of Socialist Labor (1986); Allan D. Emil Memorial Award (1987); James Clerk Maxwell Prize for Plasma Physics (2001); Carl Sagan Memorial Award (2003)
- Scientific career
- Fields: Physics
- Workplaces: Kurchatov Institute; Institute of Nuclear Physics; Russian Space Research Institute; University of Maryland
- Doctoral students: Vladimir Zakharov, Alexei Fridman

Roald Zinnurovich Sagdeev (Russian: Роальд Зиннурович Сагдеев, Tatar: Роальд Зиннур улы Сәгъдиев; born 26 December 1932) is a Russian expert in plasma physics and a former director of the Space Research Institute of the USSR Academy of Sciences. He was also a science advisor to the Soviet President Mikhail Gorbachev. Sagdeev graduated from Moscow State University. He is a member of both the Russian Academy of Sciences and the American Philosophical Society. He has worked at the University of Maryland, College Park since 1989 in the University of Maryland College of Computer, Mathematical, and Natural Sciences. He is also currently a senior advisor at the Albright Stonebridge Group, a global strategy firm, where he assists clients with issues involving Russia and countries of the former Soviet Union. Sagdeev was married to, and divorced from, Susan Eisenhower, granddaughter of Dwight D. Eisenhower. Sagdeev was the recipient of the 2003 Carl Sagan Memorial Award, and the James Clerk Maxwell Prize for Plasma Physics (2001).

== Early years ==
Roald Sagdeev is an ethnic Tatar. His maternal grandfather was a secular man teaching mathematics. He was born in Moscow on December 26, 1932, soon after the arrival of his young parents from Tatarstan. The family used to speak Russian at home. Nonetheless, the parents also communicated in Tatar between adults when secrecy was needed. He lived with them until the age of four near the Nikitsky Gates. His father was then a post-graduate student. He spent the following years in Kazan where he graduated from high school. The young Roald was not only a quite outstanding student who was awarded the silver medal but he was also a chess champion among juniors of his city. His brother Renad Zinnurovich Sagdeev (born December 13, 1941) would later study chemistry. Roald returned to Moscow to study at the Moscow State University. He was one of the Nobel laureate Lev Landau's few students. In the dormitory, he lived next to Mikhail Gorbachev, a law student, and Raisa Gorbacheva, a sociology student.

== As a researcher ==
In 1955, after graduating from Moscow State University in nuclear science, with a doctorate in physics and mathematics, he worked at the Kurchatov Institute of Atomic Energy as a member of the controlled fusion team, with Igor Kurchatov as director from 1956 to 1961. From 1961 until 1970, he worked as head of the Laboratory at the Institute of Nuclear Physics of the Siberian Division of the USSR Academy of Sciences in Novosibirsk.

At the age of 35, he was one of the youngest persons ever elected as a full academician of the Academy of Sciences of the Soviet Union. From 1970 until 1973, he worked at the Institute of Physics of High Temperatures of the USSR Academy of Sciences.

== Director of the Space Research Institute ==
Upon his return to Moscow, he was appointed the director of the Space Research Institute of the USSR Academy of Sciences. He stayed at this post from 1973 until 1988. There he supervised several research projects such as the Kosmos, Forecast, Interkosmos, Meteor, and Astron programs.

He managed or was a principal participant in many space projects including the Venera probes to Venus, the joint Soviet-U.S. Soyuz Apollo Test Project and headed the International Space Project Venus-Halley (Vega) and Phobos projects.

He is the author of studies on plasma physics and magnetofluiddynamics. In 1984, he was awarded the most prestigious Lenin Prize for his outstanding achievements in the foundations of the neoclassical theory of transport processes in toroidal plasma.

== Role in politics ==
As Yuri Andropov became the new General Secretary of the Communist Party of the Soviet Union, Sagdeev participated in the work of a think tank with Gorbachev as the head, which was mandated to find scientific justifications for nuclear disarmament. Later, as Gorbachev became the new General Secretary, following Ronald Reagan's Strategic Defense Initiative (SDI), they advised the Soviet leadership not to worry and not to respond by creating a similar program.

He was awarded the title of Hero of Socialist Labour for his role in the international research programme of the Halley Comet in 1986.

He was elected to the Supreme Soviet of the Soviet Union in 1987 and worked until 1991 as an advisor on the issues related to civil and military space problems for Mikhail Gorbachev and Eduard Shevardnadze on summits, which were held in Geneva (1985), in Washington, D.C. (1987) and in Moscow (1988). However, following the Moscow Summit, Sagdeev was removed from a state visit to Poland in July 1988 and felt "excommunicated" from Soviet leadership after writing a letter criticizing the slowness of the Soviet supercomputer program.

== Personal life ==
In 1987, Sagdeev met Susan Eisenhower at a US-USSR forum in New York City. Eisenhower, a political scientist and granddaughter of Dwight D. Eisenhower, married Sagdeev in 1990. Following the marriage, Sagdeev relocated to the United States. The couple divorced in 2008.

In 2024, Sagdeev married Elena Popova, an astrophysicist from Moscow whom he had met at academic conferences in Baku. Popova is also a composer.

== Post-Cold War ==
Sagdeev is a Distinguished Professor of Physics at the University of Maryland, College Park, member of the US National Academy and the Royal Swedish Academy of Sciences. He is also a member of the Supervisory Council of the International Luxembourg Forum on Preventing Nuclear Catastrophe. He is a senior advisor at the Albright Stonebridge Group, a global strategy firm, where he assists clients with issues involving Russia and countries of the former Soviet Union.
