= People to People International =

Nonprofit, bankrupt humanitarian organization founded by President Dwight Eisenhower

People to People International (PTPI) was a program established on September 11, 1956, by President Dwight D. Eisenhower, as part of the United States Information Agency. After President Eisenhower left the office of President in 1961, he arranged to have the organization privatized as a non-governmental organization and arranged for People to People to become a not-for-profit Missouri corporation known as People to People International. President Eisenhower was chairman of the board of trustees and recognized as the founder of the not-for-profit organization. It is incorporated as a not-for-profit organization in the state of Missouri and qualifies for exemption from income tax under the Internal Revenue Code 501(c)(3). PTPI is funded through program fees, membership dues and donations.

Among the early leaders working with President Eisenhower were Joyce C. Hall, the founder of Hallmark Cards, Inc., Walt Disney, Bob Hope and approximately 100 other individuals from industry, academia and the arts. Charles M. Schulz, creator of the Peanuts comic strip, contributed three pieces of artwork for PTPI Worldwide Conferences.

On June 22, 2006, People to People was the first organization awarded the Cavaliere per la Pace (Knight of Peace Award). Prior to People to People, recipients of this award had always been individuals. Previous honorees include Mother Teresa, Mikhail Gorbachev and Pope John Paul II. Since its inception, eight U.S. presidents served as the honorary chairman of People to People International.

People to People International filed for bankruptcy on March 22, 2022, in Missouri Western Bankruptcy court. Clients received emails soon thereafter stating that the umbrella organization could not continue operations due to financial issues caused by the COVID-19 pandemic; chapters would continue independently.

== Other PTPI programs ==
Other People to People International programs included: Educational and Humanitarian Initiatives adult travel programs, the EXPERIENCE program (an annual student travel program incorporating service work), Peace Camp (free, international travel program for students with an emphasis on peace education), the Global Landmine Initiative (working with the HALO Trust), the School and Classroom Program (an international classroom-based pen pal program), & also Community, University, Student Chapters all over the world. Also the Global Youth Forum known as the GYF, open to 13- to 18-year-olds all over the world every November.

The most recent Global Youth Forums were held in the following cities:

Year	Metro area	Location	Theme
2004	Atlanta		
2005	Washington DC		
2006	Kansas City, MO	Kansas City, MO	World Hunger
2007	Chicago	Rosemont, IL	Child Soldiers
2008	Denver	Westminster, CO	Global Education
2009	Washington DC	Crystal City, VA	Global Sustainability
2010	Atlanta	Atlanta	Global Health
2011	Kansas City	Kansas City	Cultural Understanding
2012	Chicago	Chicago	Cultural Understanding
2013	Washington DC	Washington D.C.	Global Education
2014	Kansas City	Kansas City	Humanitarianism
2017	Kansas City	Kansas City	Global Education, Humanitarianism

In early 2004, actor Gary Sinise and author Laura Hillenbrand founded Operation Iraqi Children and joined in partnership with People to People International in order to provide a way for concerned Americans to reach out to the war-stricken children of Iraq by supporting troops and their efforts to assist them. In 2009, the mission of the program was expanded to include children in areas all over the world served by American troops and the name of the program was changed to Operation International Children. The Operation International Children program announced its closing in April 2013. The final shipment to Kuwait was sent in June 2013.

PTPI was a partner of Global Youth Service Day.

People to People International had a European extension office in Berlin, Germany. There was previously an office in Cairo, Egypt.
