= Mamie Eisenhower =

First Lady of the United States from 1953 to 1961

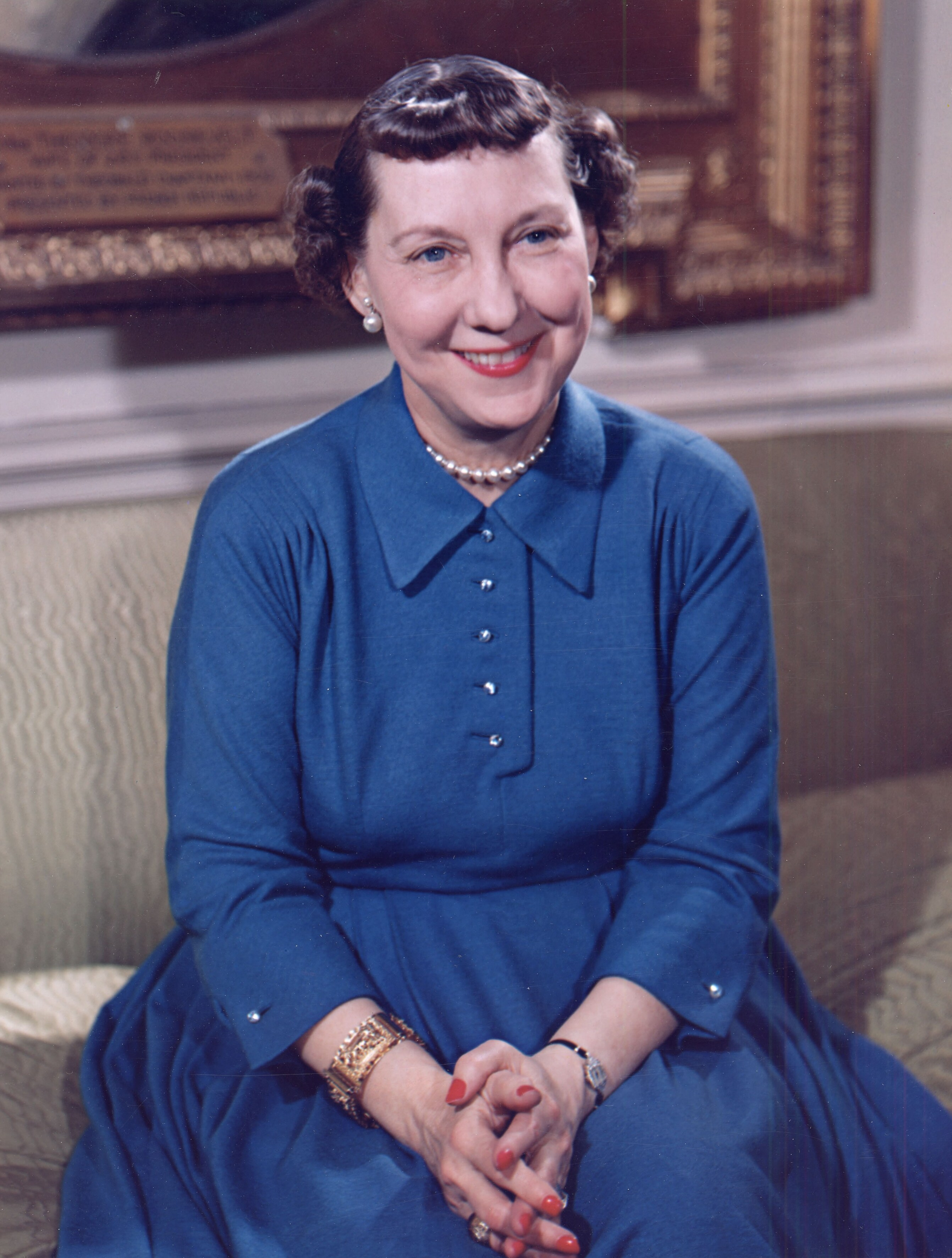
- Official portrait, c. 1954

First Lady of the United States
- In role January 20, 1953 – January 20, 1961
- President: Dwight D. Eisenhower
- Preceded by: Bess Truman
- Succeeded by: Jacqueline Kennedy

Personal details
- Born: Mamie Geneva Doud; November 14, 1896 Boone, Iowa, U.S.
- Died: November 1, 1979 (aged 82) Washington, D.C., U.S.
- Resting place: Dwight D. Eisenhower Presidential Library, Museum and Boyhood Home
- Party: Republican
- Spouse: Dwight D. Eisenhower (m. 1916; died 1969)
- Children: 2, including John

Mamie Geneva Doud Eisenhower (Note: Her first name is often given as "Mary" or "Marie", but, according to an archivist at the Eisenhower Library, "the archives are aware of no documentary sources that give a name other than Mamie.") (née Doud; November 14, 1896 – November 1, 1979) was the first lady of the United States from 1953 to 1961 as the wife of President Dwight D. Eisenhower. Born in Boone, Iowa, she was raised in a wealthy household in Colorado. She married Eisenhower, then a lieutenant in the United States Army, in 1916. She kept house and served as hostess for military officers as they moved between various postings in the United States, Panama, the Philippines, and France. Their relationship was complicated by his regular absences on duty and by the death of their firstborn son at the age of three. She became a prominent figure during World War II as General Eisenhower's wife.

As first lady, Eisenhower was given near total control over the expenses and scheduling of the White House. She closely managed the staff, and her frugality was apparent in White House budgeting throughout her tenure. She entertained many foreign heads of state in her role as hostess. She showed little interest in politics and was rarely involved in political discussion, though she did support soldiers' welfare and civil rights causes. She had poor balance due to Ménière's disease, giving rise to rumors of alcoholism. She was a popular first lady, and recognized as a fashion icon, known for her iconic bangs and frequent use of the color pink. The Eisenhowers were married for 52 years, until Dwight's death in 1969. She spent most of her retirement and widowhood at the family farm in Gettysburg, Pennsylvania, before returning to Washington in her final years, where she died in 1979.

== Early life ==
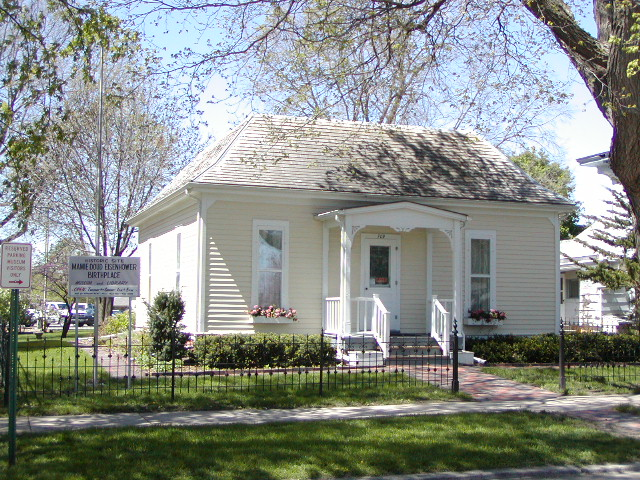
Birthplace of First Lady Mary (Mamie) Doud Eisenhower, 709 (formerly 718) Carroll Street, Boone, Iowa

Mamie Geneva Doud was born in Boone, Iowa, as the second child of meatpacking executive John Sheldon Doud and Elivera Mathilda Carlson. She grew up in Cedar Rapids, Iowa; Pueblo, Colorado; Colorado Springs, Colorado; Denver, Colorado; and the Doud winter home in San Antonio, Texas. Her mother was a daughter of Swedish immigrants, and Swedish was often spoken at home. Her father ran a meatpacking company founded by his father, Doud & Montgomery, until he retired at age 36. He also had investments in Illinois and Iowa stockyards, producing a sizeable fortune. His wealth provided the family with many comforts, including servants who tended to their needs and connections with high society.

Mamie had three sisters: her older sister, Eleanor Carlson Doud, and her two younger sisters, Eda Mae Doud and Mabel Frances "Mike" Doud. The family was beset by tragedy early in Mamie's life when Eleanor died at age 17. Their parents operated under a strict separation of spheres, whereby the father made decisions for the family and the business and the mother ran the household. Having a staff to tend to the household's needs, Mamie never learned to keep house, a skill she would have to learn from her husband. She came down with a severe case of rheumatic fever as a child, bringing about lifelong health concerns. Though her education was limited, her father taught her to manage budgeting and finance. Her family traveled extensively, and when she grew older, she was sent to Wolcott School for Girls for finishing school.

== Marriage and family ==
=== Marriage ===
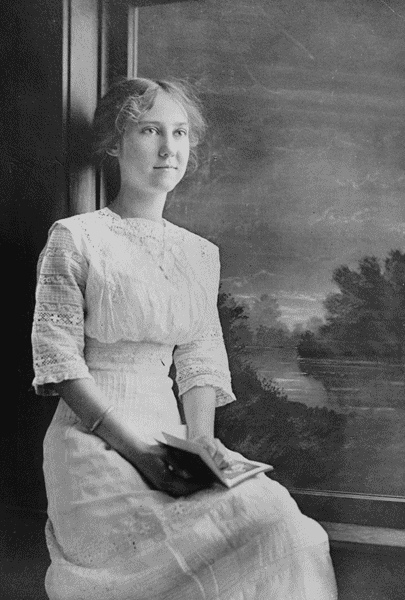
Mamie at age 17 in 1913

Doud had many suitors, but she became interested in second lieutenant Dwight D. "Ike" Eisenhower in 1915. They were introduced while the Douds were visiting a friend at Fort Sam Houston. He broke convention by inviting her to tour the facility with him while he made his rounds. She was immediately infatuated with him, but turned him down when he asked her on a date. He pursued her for the following month before they began to date exclusively, and they were engaged on Valentine's Day, 1916. Ike initially gave her a miniature of his West Point class ring, as was customary. At her request, he later gave her a full-size ring, and he formally asked permission to marry her on Saint Patrick's Day. Mamie celebrated both Valentine's Day and Saint Patrick's Day as anniversaries of their engagement.

Mamie's father agreed to the marriage on the condition that Eisenhower did not enter the Army Air Service, as he considered it too dangerous. Apprehension of American entry into World War I accelerated their plans to wed, and they were married at the Doud family's home in Denver on July 1, 1916. They went on honeymoon and visited Ike's parents in Abilene, Kansas, before returning to Fort Sam Houston, where Ike was stationed. Mamie also met Ike's brother, Milton S. Eisenhower, who became a close friend to her.

=== Army wife ===
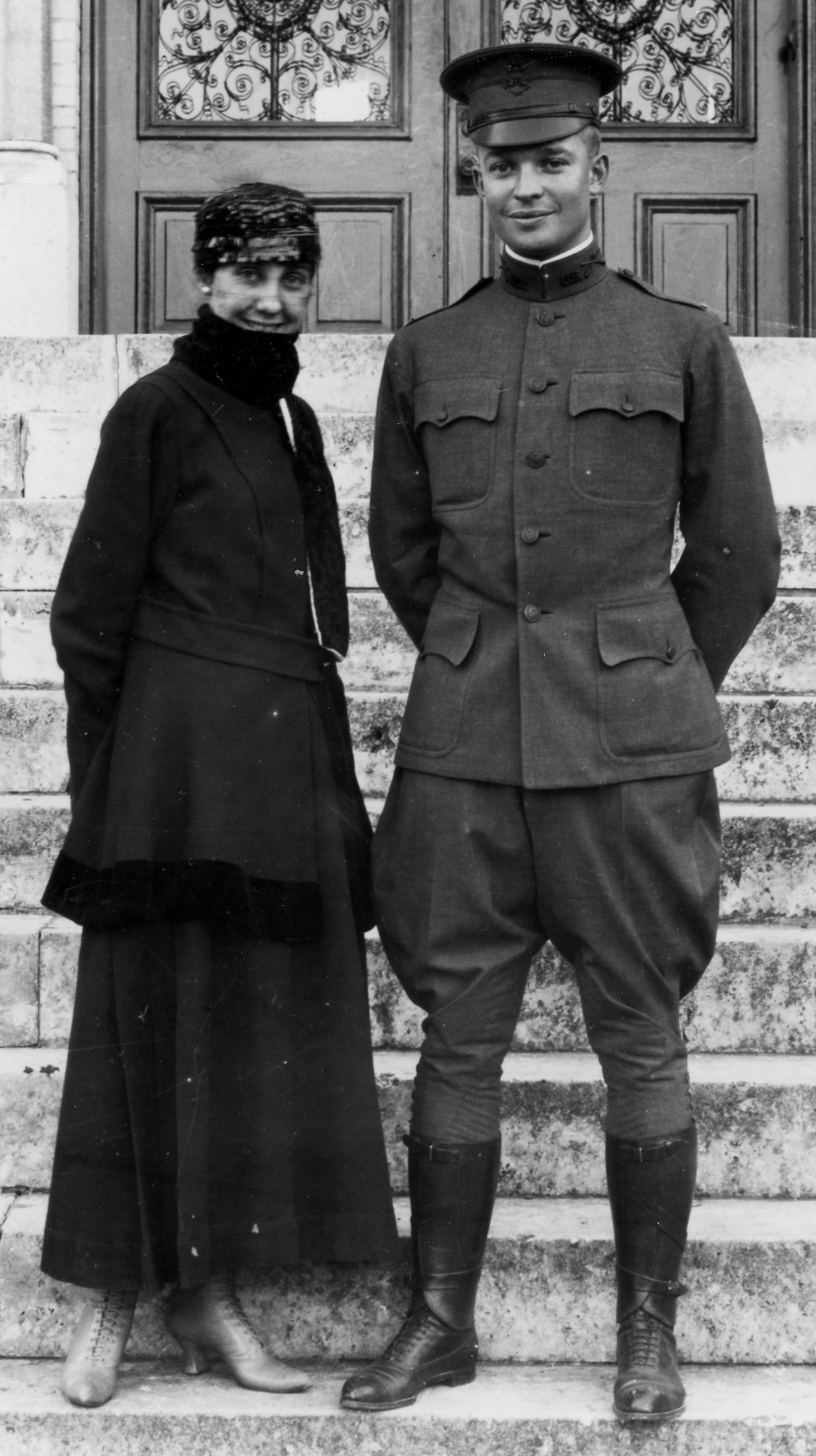
Mamie Eisenhower, with her husband, Dwight, on the steps of St. Mary's College, San Antonio, Texas, in 1916

Eisenhower lived the life of an army wife over the following years, continually moving as her husband was stationed at different posts. Over the course of Ike's 37 years in the military, they lived in 33 different homes. During some of these postings, she participated in community projects, such as the establishment of a hospital in Panama. Their military housing was often meager, and she was tasked with furnishing their temporary homes and making them livable. The Eisenhowers regularly entertained wherever they lived, and their home came to be known as "Club Eisenhower". Mamie often attended card parties and luncheons with officers' wives, befriending many of them, but had little patience for the gossip and intrigue that sometimes took place, refusing to take part in it.

Eisenhower no longer had the comforts that she had grown accustomed to in childhood. They had to survive on Ike's military pay and occasional support from Mamie's father. Ike and Mamie were often both physically and emotionally distant from each other, and Mamie experienced bouts of depression throughout her time as an army wife. She had to grow accustomed to fear and loneliness during periods of separation while her husband was traveling for the army, and Ike once told her that his duty would "always come first".

The Eisenhowers had two sons. Their first, Doud Dwight "Icky" Eisenhower, was born on September 24, 1917. Having to care for him on her own despite her weak health, Mamie worked herself to exhaustion. Icky died of scarlet fever at age three on January 2, 1921. Mamie was devastated, and had little to distract herself from the tragedy. Their second son, John Sheldon Doud Eisenhower, was born in Denver on August 3, 1922. His birth helped alleviate some of the depression brought about by her firstborn's death and her separations from Ike, and she doted on John well into adulthood. John served in the military, was the United States Ambassador to Belgium, and wrote several books.

In 1922, Ike was stationed in Panama, and Mamie struggled in the jungle environment. They went to Denver shortly before John's birth, and Mamie stayed behind after Ike returned to Panama. She rejoined him in Panama two months later, accompanied by a nurse the family had hired to help raise John. On the advice of the wife of General Fox Conner, Mamie took interest in Ike's career and presented herself as a supportive military wife, strengthening their relationship. In 1928, she encouraged her husband to take a position in Paris instead of in the War Department. She hosted increasingly important guests as her husband's military career progressed. When Ike was appointed as aide to General Douglas MacArthur in 1929, the family moved to Washington, D.C., and "Club Eisenhower" became a popular social hub for the city's elite. She initially chose to stay in Washington when her husband was stationed in the Philippines in 1935, and their relationship was strained by the time she joined him the following year. The family returned to the U.S. shortly after the onset of World War II in 1939.

=== General's wife ===
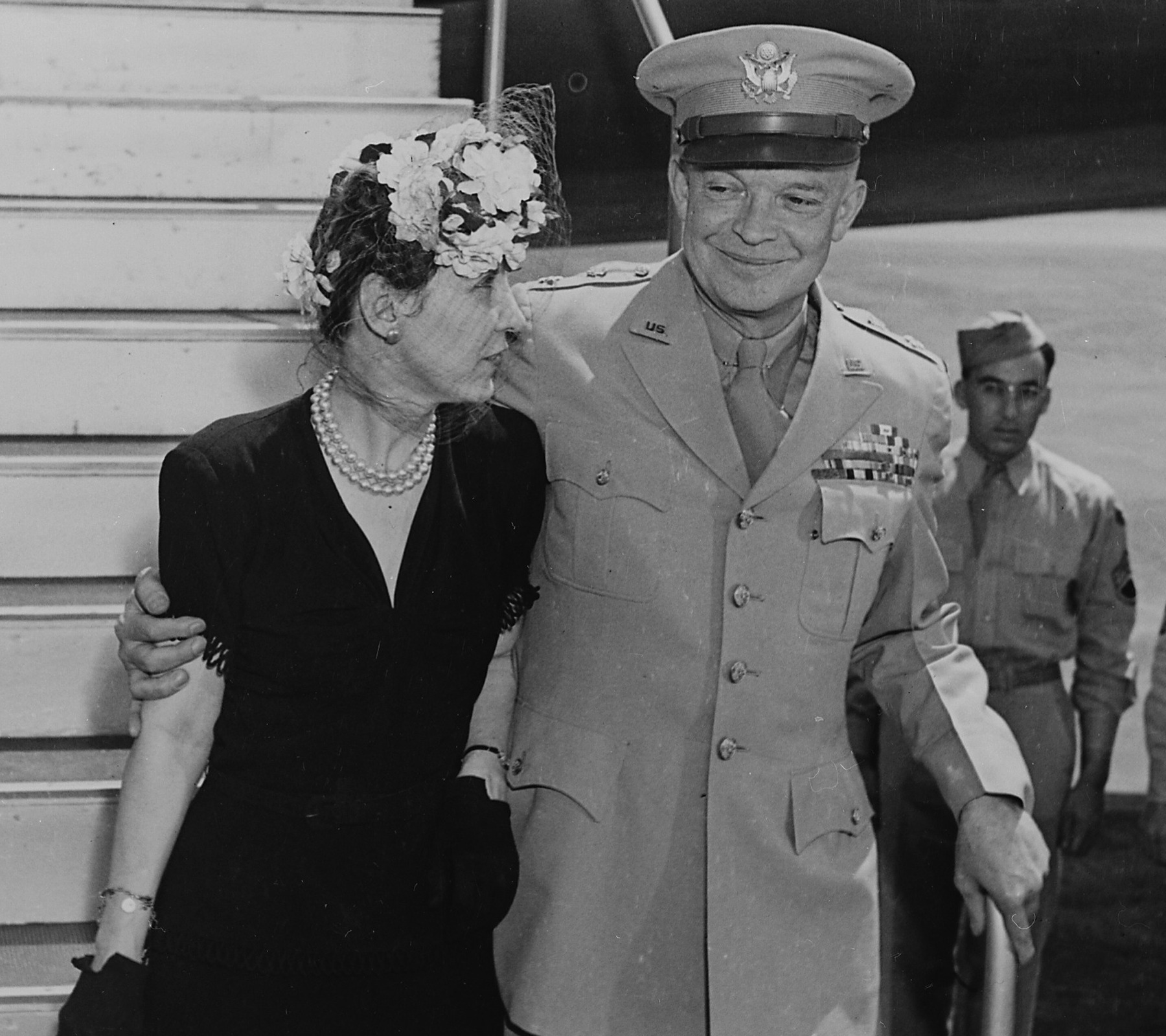
Mamie and Dwight Eisenhower in 1945

During World War II, while promotion and fame came to Ike, his wife lived in Washington, D.C. During the three years Ike was stationed in Europe, Mamie saw him only once. She made her own contributions to the war effort, volunteering anonymously for the American Women's Voluntary Services and the United Service Organizations, among other groups. Mamie constantly worried about her husband's safety while he led the war effort in Europe, and was regularly accosted by reporters, causing her to lose 20 pounds during the war. Rumors emerged that she was an alcoholic, though no evidence supported this claim. Her struggle was further complicated by Ike's close relationship with his chauffeur, Kay Summersby; she had become a close confidante of Ike's, and rumors emerged that he had taken her as a mistress. Ike's military success and his subsequent memoirs provided the couple with financial stability after the war.

After Ike became president of Columbia University in 1948, the Eisenhowers purchased a farm (now the Eisenhower National Historic Site) at Gettysburg, Pennsylvania. It was the first home they had ever owned. She continued in her hosting duties, this time for faculty wives and large donors in addition to the friends her husband had made in the military. Ike was then made commander of the North Atlantic Treaty Organization forces, and their return to Paris delayed work on their dream home, which was not completed until 1955. In Europe, the two regularly received royals, and Mamie was awarded the Cross of Merit for her role in her husband's military success. When Ike agreed to run in the 1952 presidential election, Mamie campaigned for him. She appeared to enjoy campaigning, and was popular among voters. She sometimes subverted her husband's campaign managers' wishes, making speaking appearances without their knowledge and suggesting changes to his speeches.

== First Lady of the United States ==
=== White House hostess ===
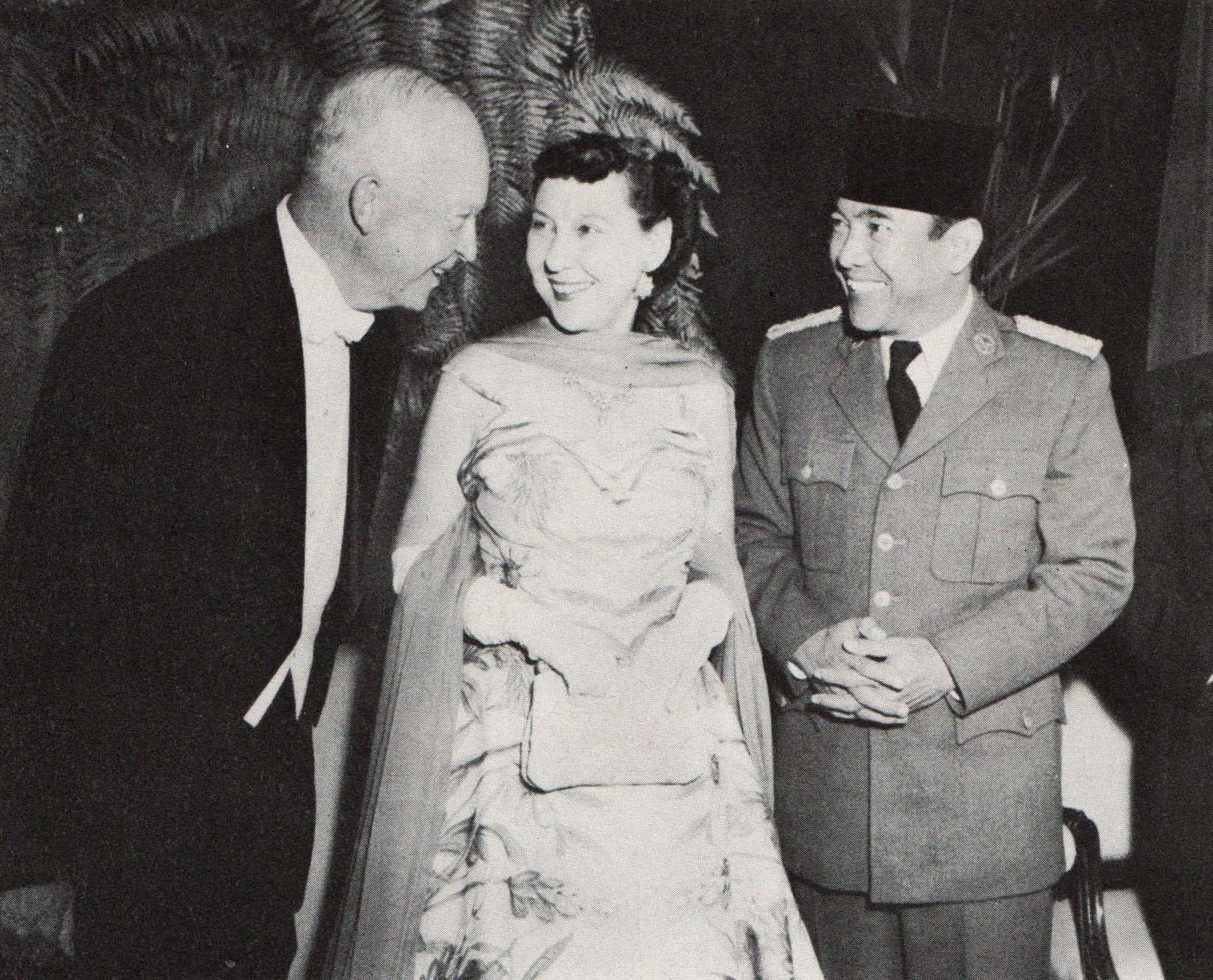
Mamie and Dwight Eisenhower with Indonesian President Sukarno

Eisenhower became first lady as the position first began to present a national public image. She maligned the attention associated with the role, insisting that her husband was the public figure of the family and generally refusing to take on duties outside the White House. She maintained distance from the press, avoiding interviews and having her secretary Mary Jane McCaffree address reporters in her stead. She also declined a request to write a column for the New York Herald Tribune, and held only one press conference during her tenure. She was friendly with reporters when they did interact, insisting that they address her as Mamie. Her ambivalence toward the press did not extend toward photographers, whom she readily accommodated. She also wrote a personal response to every letter she received and sometimes passed on concerns the letters raised.

Despite her reservations about public life, Eisenhower enjoyed her role as a hostess. During her time as first lady, she entertained many heads of state. In total, she entertained about 70 official foreign visitors. She was a capable hostess, having spent much of her adult life hosting as a military wife. She hosted social events full time and reveled in the pageantry associated with the presidency. Eisenhower was lauded for her social prowess, greeting and shaking hands with thousands of people during her tenure as first lady. When entertaining, she prioritized comfort and popular taste over prestige. She often employed male quartets and musicians such as Fred Waring to perform for guests at the White House.

Media coverage of Eisenhower was generally favorable, focusing on her personality and charm rather than politics or scandal.

=== Managing the White House ===
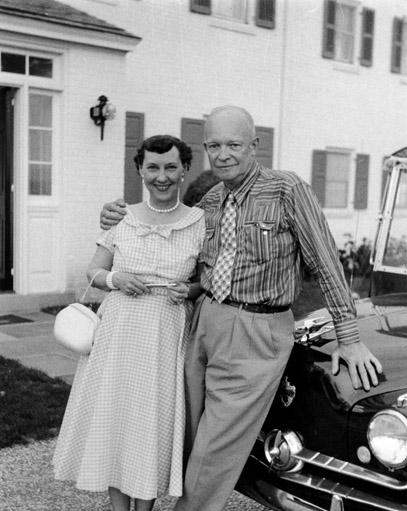
Mamie and Dwight Eisenhower in 1955

Eisenhower took naturally to managing the White House and its staff, drawing on her experience as an army wife. She had a strained relationship with the staff after taking charge, having imposed many rules to liken them to more traditional house staff and managing them closely. Over time she built relationships with the staff, treating them as family and even celebrating their birthdays. When their house in Gettysburg was completed in 1955, they celebrated by throwing a housewarming party for the White House staff. Eisenhower typically managed the White House from her bedroom, staying in bed due to her poor health. The Eisenhowers were accustomed to splitting their responsibilities, and Mamie was given total authority over house spending and scheduling. She had developed a strict frugality as an army wife, and micromanaged White House expenses. She clipped coupons for the White House staff and her recipe for "Mamie's million dollar fudge" was very popular.

During her tenure, she had several rooms redecorated in her favorite colors, pink and green. Eisenhower was especially active during the Christmas season, during which she had the White House heavily decorated for the occasion and bought gifts for the White House staff. In 1958, she was also reported to be the first person to initiate Halloween decorations for the White House. Her attempts to decorate the White House were complicated by lack of federal funding, and many of her changes depended on private donations. She dedicated much time to the flower arrangements of the White House, favoring gladioli. Her possessiveness over White House decor sometimes caused conflict with the staff, as it contradicted the recognized norm that the first family were residents rather than owners of the White House. She held great reverence for the building, saying that she "never drove up to the south portico without a lump coming to [her] throat".

When Ike had a heart attack in 1955, Mamie helped keep him warm and got him medical attention. Afterward, she regularly tended to him, limiting his work schedule, managing his diet, and taking his mail. She also had a room set aside upstairs in the White House where he could practice his painting in solitude. She gave him strong emotional support at a time when he lacked the energy or desire to carry out his responsibilities as president. When it was unclear whether Ike would run for reelection in 1956 due to his health, Mamie encouraged him to run. She was protective of him during his periods of illness, at one point informing Pat Nixon without his knowledge that he was not healthy enough to campaign for Richard Nixon in the 1960 presidential election. Mamie also had medical concerns of her own; among others, she was uneasy on her feet due to Ménière's disease, an inner-ear disorder that affects equilibrium, which fed rumors that she had a drinking problem.

=== Politics ===
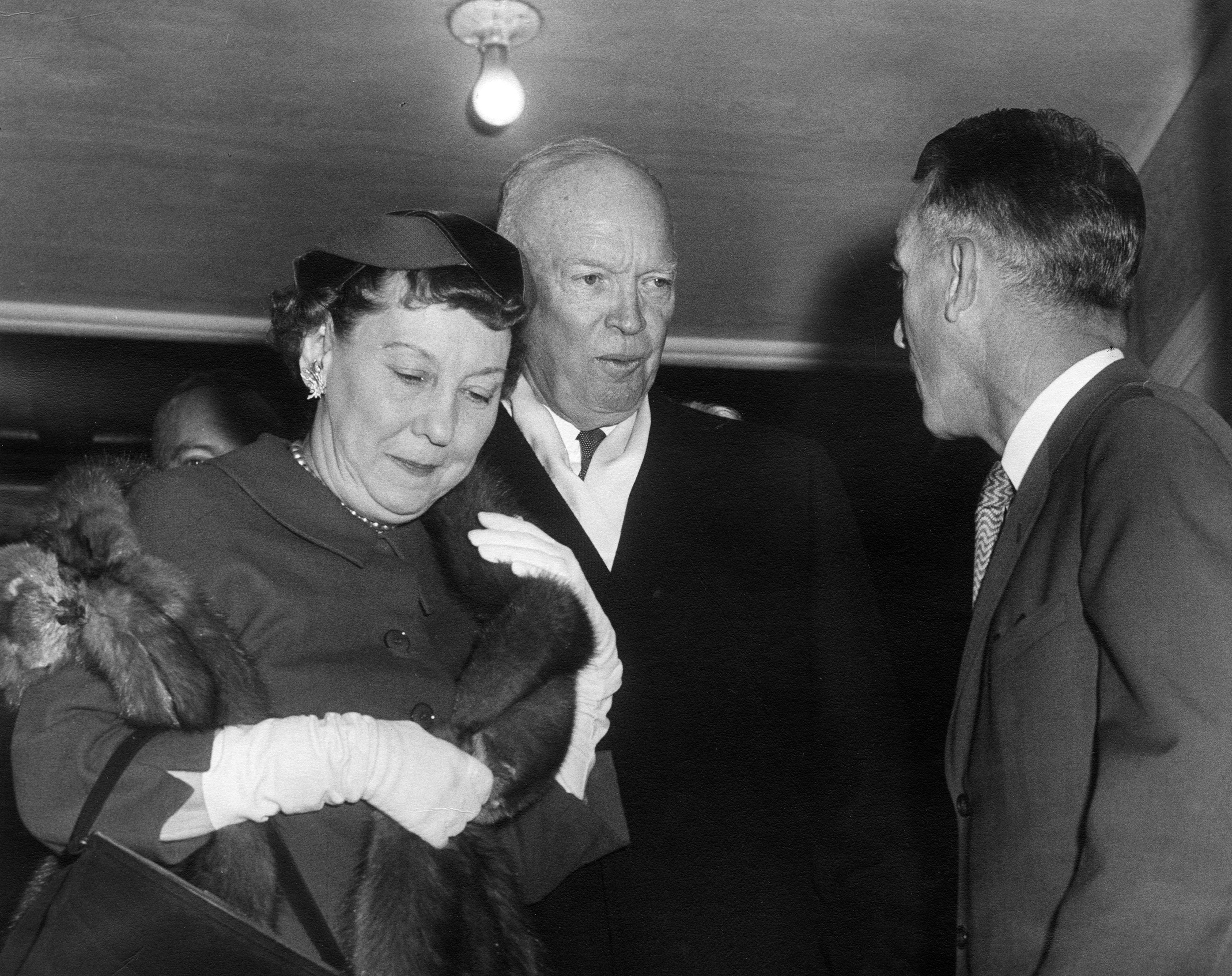
Mamie Eisenhower with her husband at the 1960 State of the Union Address

Eisenhower had little interest in the presidency's political aspects, and was never directly involved in her husband's decisions. She entered the West Wing of the White House only four times during her tenure. This lack of political involvement contributed to her subservient image that protected her from heavy media scrutiny and bolstered her popularity. The main political cause that interested her was social issues, including women's issues and civil rights. She expressed a desire to see women elected to Congress, and sponsored several women's clubs. She also invited Black women to the White House, including Marian Anderson and the National Council of Negro Women. Other causes she supported include soldiers' benefits, civil defense, blood drives, and the United Nations. After her husband's heart attack, she chaired fundraising for the American Heart Association. The president also consulted her at times on economic issues, having depended on her for finance throughout their marriage.

Her control over the guest list and social scheduling allowed Eisenhower some degree of political influence. When organizing the 1953 annual vice president's dinner, she invited every senator except Joseph McCarthy, allowing the president to maintain distance from McCarthy without taking a stance. When the President of Haiti visited the White House, she ensured he would be received with full honors to celebrate the first Black head of state to visit the White House. Most of her influence in the Oval Office came through her social role; she made a point of knowing the president's cabinet members and support staff, and congratulated them and their wives on successes to improve morale.

Eisenhower was reportedly unhappy with the idea of John F. Kennedy coming into office following her husband's term and expressed displeasure about new First Lady Jacqueline Kennedy, calling her "the college girl". Jacqueline Kennedy had given birth to John Jr. via caesarean section two weeks before a planned tour of the White House, but Mamie did not inform her that a wheelchair was available for her to use while showing her the various sections of the White House. Seeing Eisenhower's displeasure during the tour, Kennedy kept her composure in Eisenhower's presence, collapsing in private once she returned home. When Eisenhower was later asked why she would do such a thing, she replied, "Because she never asked."

== Later life ==
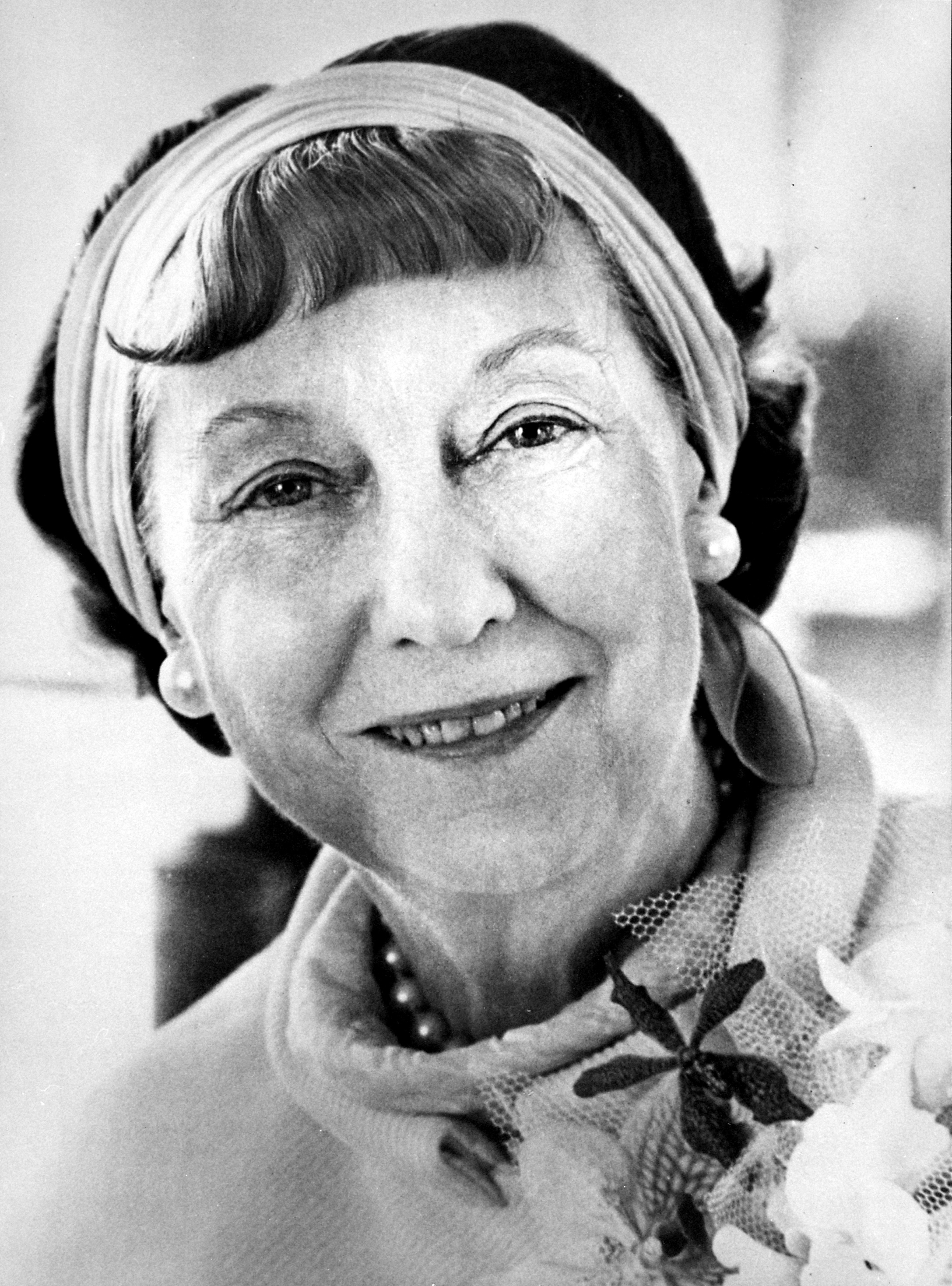
Mamie Eisenhower portrait, April 27, 1971

In 1961, Eisenhower retired with the former president to Gettysburg, their first permanent home. They also had a retirement home in Palm Desert, California. She made appearances on occasion for the Kennedy administration, including a fundraiser for the National Cultural Center and a state dinner with the Prime Minister of Japan. As her husband was dying, legislation passed that guaranteed lifetime Secret Service protection for presidential widows. Following Ike's death in March 1969, Mamie went to Belgium, where their son was serving as ambassador. After returning to the U.S., she continued to live full-time on the farm until she took an apartment in Washington, D.C., as her health declined in the late 1970s. She often stayed in her bedroom after her husband's death while Secret Service agents supported her.

Eisenhower remained close to the Nixon family after her tenure as first lady, and her grandson married the Nixons' daughter in 1968. She appeared in a commercial to support Richard Nixon's reelection in the 1972 presidential election, and the Nixons regularly invited Mamie to the White House throughout the Nixon presidency. She took stronger political stances later in life; she supported the Vietnam War, though she recognized the hardship faced by American soldiers, and opposed the women's liberation movement. She supported Dick Thornburgh for governor of Pennsylvania, and George H. W. Bush in the 1980 Republican Party presidential primaries. In 1973, Eisenhower finally addressed rumors of alcoholism in an interview, explaining the nature of her vertigo. Rumors of Ike's alleged affair with Kay Summersby reemerged in the 1970s, though Mamie continued to say that she did not believe them.

=== Death ===
Eisenhower had a stroke on September 25, 1979. She was rushed to Walter Reed Army Medical Center, where her husband had died a decade before. Eisenhower remained in the hospital, and on October 31, announced to her granddaughter Mary Jean that she would die the next day. She died in her sleep on the morning of November 1. A memorial service was held in the Fort Myer chapel on November 5 with attendants including the Nixons, Rosalynn Carter, Senator Jacob Javits, Federal Reserve Chair Arthur F. Burns, and Eisenhower's Secret Service agents. She is buried beside her husband in his hometown of Abilene, Kansas.

== Legacy ==
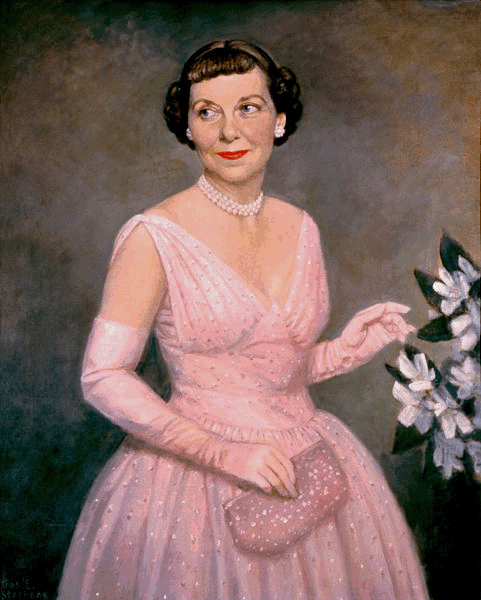
Mamie Eisenhower in her inaugural gown, painted in 1953 by Thomas Stevens

Eisenhower's birthplace is open to the public and operated by the Mamie Doud Eisenhower Foundation. Places bearing the name Mamie Eisenhower include a park in Denver and a library in the Denver suburb of Broomfield, Colorado. She was inducted into the Colorado Women's Hall of Fame in 1985.

=== Impact on fashion ===
Eisenhower was known for her sense of fashion, and many women adopted her style. The New York Dress Institute named her one of the 12 best-dressed women in the country every year that she was first lady. Her style was known as the "Mamie Look"; it involved a full-skirted dress, pink gloves, charm bracelets, pearls, little hats, purses, and bobbed, banged hair. Her style was associated with Dior's postwar "New Look", and included both high- and low-end items. Her frugality affected her style, as she often sought out bargains and kept clothes long after buying them.

Eisenhower wore a Nettie Rosenstein gown to the 1953 inaugural balls, a pink peau de soie gown embroidered with more than 2,000 rhinestones. It is one of the most popular of the Smithsonian National Museum of American History's collection of inaugural gowns. Eisenhower paired it with matching gloves, and jewelry by Trifari. She carried a beaded purse by Judith Leiber (then an employee of Nettie Rosenstein). Her shoes by Delman had her name printed on the left instep. Eisenhower first adopted her iconic bangs while Ike was stationed in Panama; she found that the hairstyle helped her keep cool in the tropical environment, and decided to keep it after returning to the United States. She owned many cosmetics and perfumes, and often visited a beauty spa to maintain her appearance. Eisenhower's fondness for a specific shade of pink, often called "First Lady" or "Mamie" pink, kicked off a national trend for pink clothing, housewares, and bathrooms.

=== Historical assessments ===
Eisenhower is remembered neither as a traditionalist like Bess Truman nor as an activist like Eleanor Roosevelt. Her tenure occurred at a time when the role was undergoing major changes and growing in prominence. Her influence on the Eisenhower administration was reserved, respecting a strict division between her husband's public life and their home life. To the public she symbolized the glamor, style, and growth associated with the United States in the 1950s. She played the role of the "perfect wife" of her era: highly feminine, subservient to her husband, and focused on the household. The most significant effect she had on the position of first lady was the organization of a dedicated personal staff that became the Office of the First Lady of the United States.

Since 1982, Siena College Research Institute has periodically conducted a survey asking historians to assess American first ladies according to a cumulative score on their background, value to the country, intelligence, courage, accomplishments, integrity, leadership, being their own women, public image, and value to the president. Eisenhower has been ranked:

- 31st-best of 42 in 1982
- 17th-best of 37 in 1993
- 27th-best of 38 in 2003
- 19th-best of 38 in 2008
- 24th-best of 39 in 2014
- 21st-best of 40 in 2020

In an additional question accompanying the 2014 survey, Eisenhower placed third among 20th- and 21st-century first ladies who historians felt could have done more. In the 2014 survey, Eisenhower and her husband were also ranked 14th out of 39 first couples in terms of being a "power couple".

== Bibliography ==
- D'Este, Carlo (2002). Eisenhower: A Soldier's Life. Henry Holt & Company. ISBN 9780805056860.
- Eisenhower, Susan (1996). Mrs. Ike: Memories and Reflections on the Life of Mamie Eisenhower. Farrar, Straus and Giroux. ISBN 9780374215149.
- Holt, Marilyn Irvin. Mamie Doud Eisenhower: The General's First Lady. Lawrence: University Press of Kansas, 2007. ISBN 9780700615391 OCLC 128236450
- Kimball, D. L. I Remember Mamie. Fayette, IA: Trends & Events, 1981. ISBN 0942698002 OCLC 8228995

Honorary titles
Preceded by Bess Truman	First Lady of the United States; 1953–1961	Succeeded by Jacqueline Kennedy
