= Anatomy (disambiguation) =

Anatomy is the biological science concerned with the structure of living things

Anatomy may also refer to:

- Human anatomy, the biological science concerned with the structure of the human body
- Plant anatomy, the biological science concerned with the structure of plants
- Anatomy (film), released in 2000, a German horror film
- Anatomy 2, released in 2003, the sequel to the film Anatomy
- Amatory anatomy, a style of English poetry
- Anatomy (Stan Ridgway album), 1999
- Anatomy (Drugstore album), 2011
- Anatomy (Sally Potter album), 2025
- "Anatomy", a song by The Devil Wears Prada from the EP Zombie
- "Anatomic", a song by the Afro Celt Sound System from the album Volume 5: Anatomic
- Anatomy, a video game by independent developer Kitty Horrorshow.
- Project anatomy, a tool for integration planning that visualizes dependencies between work items in development projects
- System anatomy, a systems development tool that visualizes the dependencies between system capabilities in (complex) systems
- Menippean satire, a genre referred to by critic Northrop Frye as "anatomy"

== See also ==
- Gray's Anatomy (disambiguation)
