= Vienna Opera Ball =

Austrian debutante ball

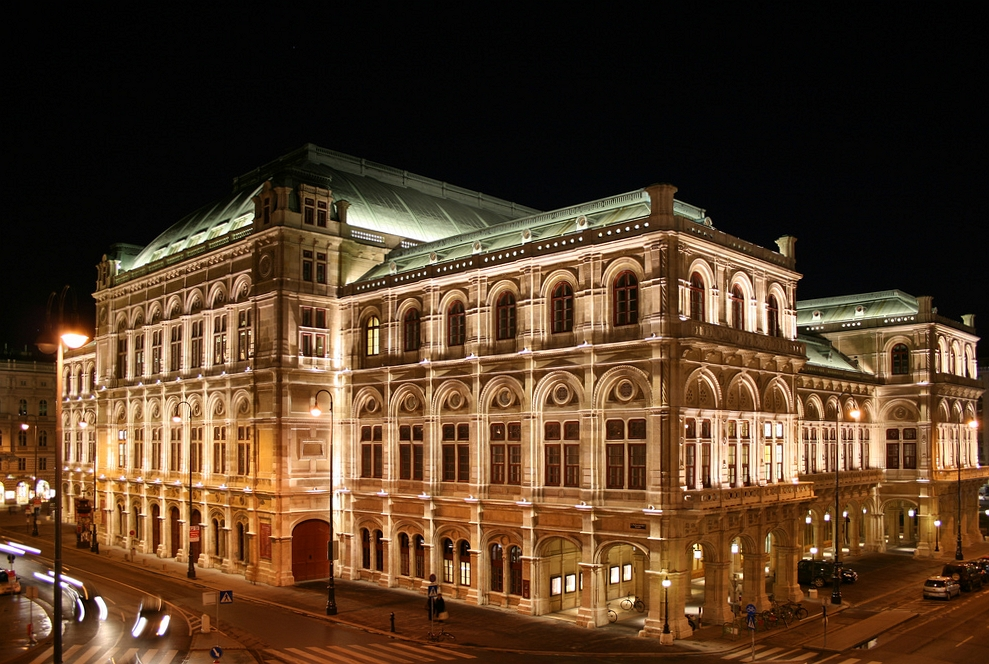
Vienna Opera House

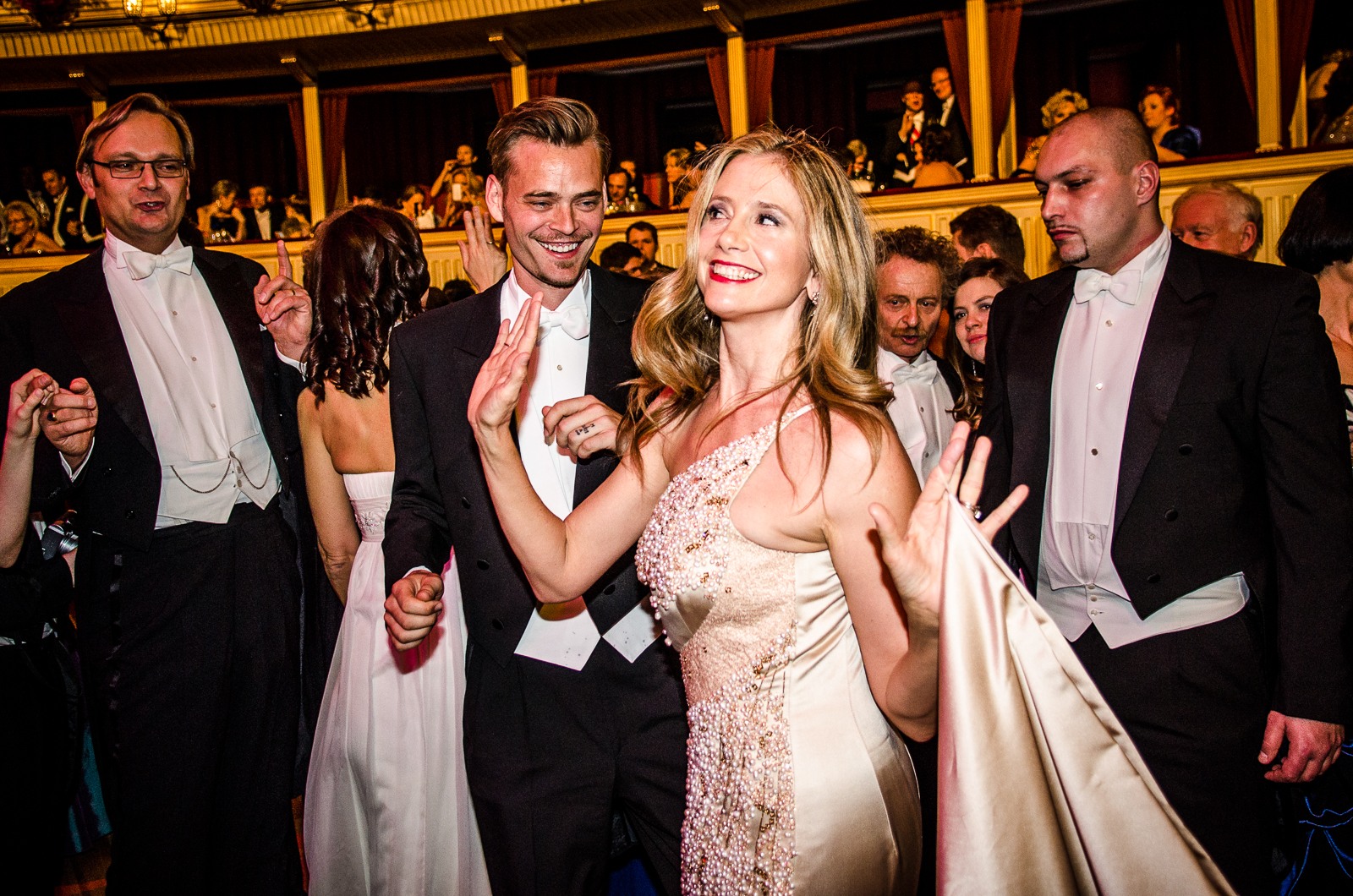
The actress Mira Sorvino at the opera ball (2013)

The Vienna Opera Ball (German: Wiener Opernball) is an annual Austrian society event which takes place in the building of the Vienna State Opera in Vienna, Austria on the Thursday preceding Ash Wednesday (a religious holiday). Together with the New Year Concert, the ball is one of the highlights of the Viennese carnival season.

== History ==
The tradition of the ball goes back to 1814 during the time when the crowned heads of Europe and the aristocracy searched for entertainment after the Napoleonic Wars. The first ball in the opera house took place in 1877 as a soirée. The following balls were redoute, a French term for masquerade balls or costume parties, where the ladies wore their masks until midnight. From 1878 until 1899, such redoute balls took place around two to three times a year.

The first redoute after World War I took place in 1921, with proceeds going to the pension fund of the two state theaters. These events were called also called Opernredoute.

The first ball to be named "Opera Ball" was held in 1935 under the honorary patronage of the Federal Chancellor, but was suspended during World War II. It was revived after the war; it has been held annually ever since, with the exception of 1991, when it was cancelled due to the Persian Gulf War, and 2021 and 2022, both due to the COVID-19 pandemic. Since 2008, Desirée Treichl-Stürgkh has been the chairman (supervising organizer) of the Vienna Opera Ball. It is the highlight of the season, with the heads of state and government, the political and industrial elite, members of the high society, and their guests attending. The price for the entry tickets is the highest of all the Viennese balls.

Starting in 1987, the Opernballdemo [de], a left-wing demonstration along the Ringstraße against the kind of capitalism represented by, as the protesters see it, many of the elite attending the ball, has regularly taken place on the same night. There have been occasional outbreaks of violence. This has almost disappeared since 2011, with protests focusing on the nationalist Akademikerball instead.

In February 2020 the first same-sex couple were presented as debutante and escort at the ball. The two debutantes, Iris Klopfer and Sophie Grau, were from Germany. Klopfer wore the traditional white dress, long white gloves, and tiara typical for female debutantes while Grau, who is non-binary, wore the traditional black suit and tailcoats typical for male escorts.

== Organization ==
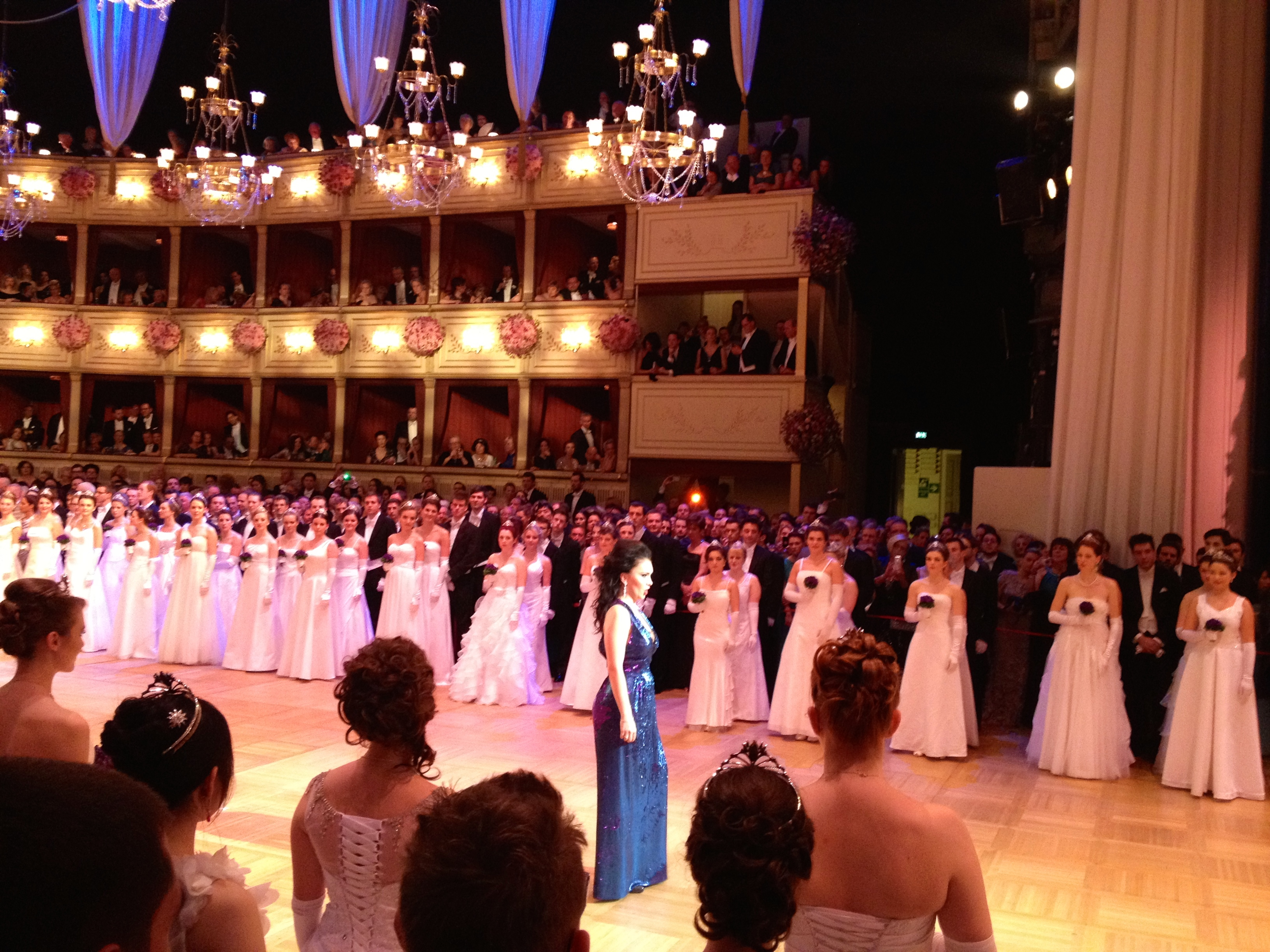
Opera singer Margarita Gritskova singing an aria during the opening ceremony (2014)

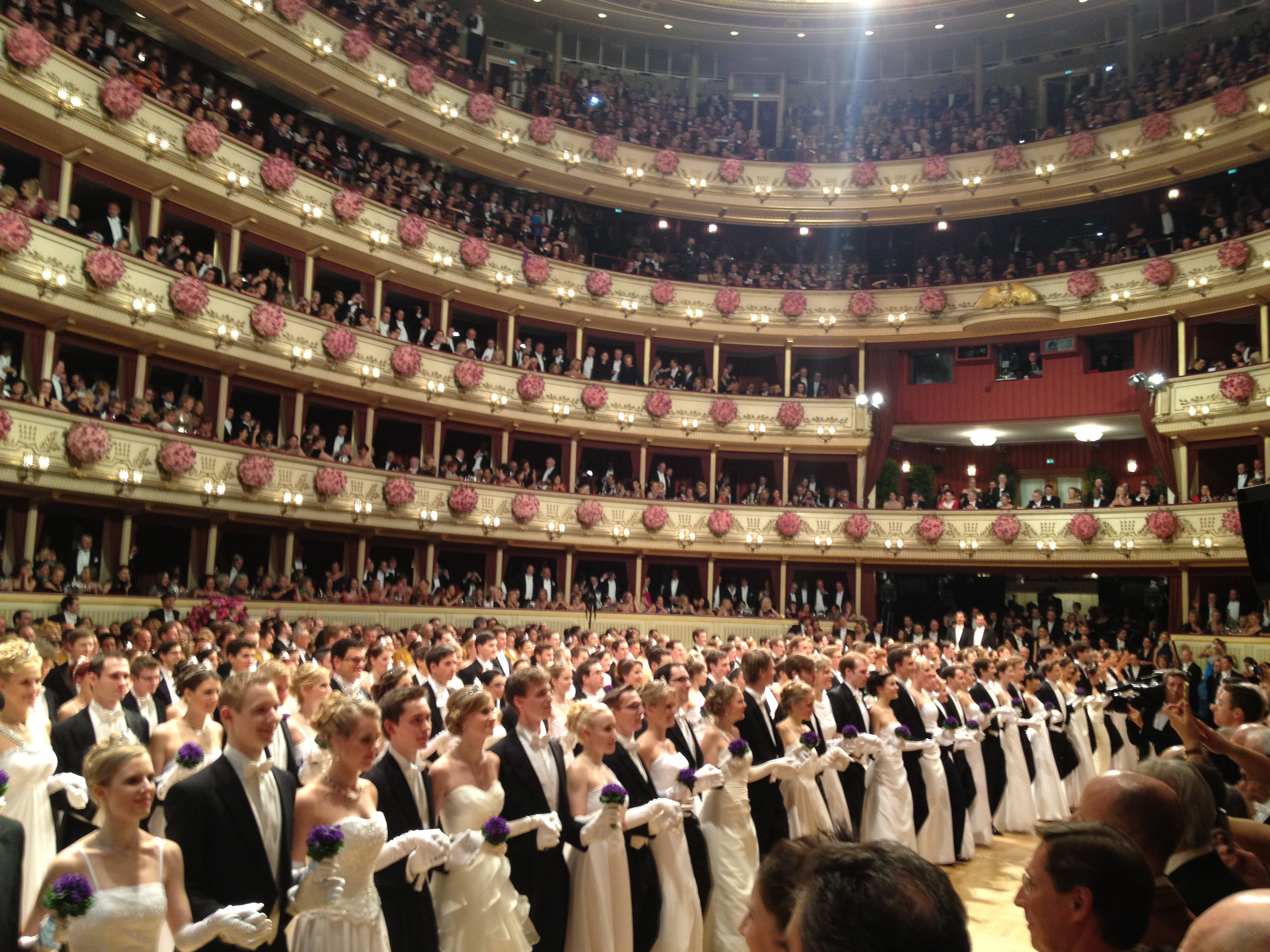
Debutantes' entry during the opening of the ball (2014)

Each year, almost overnight, the auditorium of the Vienna State Opera is turned into a large ballroom. On the eve of the event, the rows of seats are removed from the stalls, and a new floor, level with the stage, is built.

The dress code is evening dress: white tie and tails for men; strictly floor-length gowns for women. White opera gloves are still mandatory for female debutantes at the Vienna Opera Ball.

The ball does not start until around 10 pm when the Austrian president and his guests enter the imperial balcony. Their arrival is heralded by trumpets. The Austrian national anthem is played followed by the European anthem. There are performances of the state opera ballet company and classical arias sung by the opera stars. These are normally a small selection of Italian opera and famous Austrian pieces. The highlight of the opening ceremony is the introduction of 180 debutante couples. These are carefully selected young women and men who have successfully completed an audition in the opera, selected according to their Vienna Waltzing skills. The debutante dance is choreographed and supervised by a professional dance school (Santner Dance School). The debutantes are led into the opera house to the sounds of Carl Michael Ziehrer's Fächerpolonaise. Dances are then, for example, the Polonaise in A-Dur, Op. 40 by Frédéric Chopin and Johann Strauss' Warschauer-Polka. The last dance of the debutantes is always the Blue Danube Viennese Waltz by Johann Strauss II, after which the floor is opened to all guests.

The ball runs until 5 am. The opera house offers all access to the guests, with various other rooms and lounges open with different types of music and dance. There is catering on all floors offered by Café Gerstner and various other caterers, as well as a hairdressing service, a make-up service and an in-house tailor, and medical teams on standby.

Various dances moderated by the head of the dance school take place every two hours, such as the popular cotillion.

In a joint venture, ORF and BR broadcast live from the ball for several hours each year.

== In media ==
In 1995 Austrian writer Josef Haslinger published a novel entitled Opernball in which thousands of people are killed in a Neo-Nazi terrorist attack taking place during that society event. The novel was the basis of a 1998 made-for-TV movie by Urs Egger with the same title.

The ball was featured in the postcard for San Marino in the Eurovision Song Contest 2015. In it, San Marinese participants Michele Perniola and Anita Simoncini attend an evening at the ball.

== Outside of Austria ==
"Viennese balls" outside of Austria are held in Paris, New York, Moscow, Stockholm, Dubai, Timișoara, etc.

== See also ==
- Opernball (disambiguation)
- List of balls in Vienna
