= IDD =

IDD or Idd may refer to:

== Academia ==
- International Development Department, an academic department on poverty reduction at the University of Birmingham
- Integrated Dual Degree program

== Locations ==
- Idd, a parish and former municipality in Halden, Norway

== Observances ==
- International Dance Day
- International Day of Democracy

== People with the surname ==
- Dolal Idd, an American killed in an exchange of gunfire with Minneapolis police

== Science and technology ==
- Insulin-dependent diabetes, called diabetes mellitus type 1
- Interictal dysphoric disorder
- International direct dialing, in telephony
- Iodine deficiency disorders, commonly used when discussing IDD eradication programs
- I_{DD}, the electric current in the drains of a CMOS circuit
- Interface Design Description, in the military software standard MIL-STD-498
- Intellectual Development Disorder
- Integration Driven Development
