= Opernball =

Opernball (German for Opera Ball) may refer to:

- Der Opernball, an 1898 operetta by Richard Heuberger
- Opernball (novel), a 1995 novel by Josef Haslinger
  - Opernball (film), a 1998 television political thriller by Urs Egger based on Haslinger's novel
- Vienna Opera Ball or Wiener Opernball, an annual society event held at the Vienna State Opera (since 1935)
- Budapest Opera Ball or Budapester Opernball, an annual charity event at the Budapest Opera (since 1886)
- Viennese Opera Ball in New York or Wiener Opernball in New York, a charity event at Waldorf Astoria (since 1956)
- Oslo Operaball in Norway. Annual event in Gamle Logen since 1988
- The Opera Ball (1931 film) (German title Opernredoute), sometimes called Opernball
- Opernball (1939 film), a German musical comedy directed by Géza von Bolváry, an adaptation of the 1898 operetta
  - Opera Ball (1956 film), an Austrian remake by Ernst Marischka starring Theo Lingen, an adaptation of the 1898 operetta
