= Stefan Ruzowitzky =

Austrian filmmaker (born 1961)

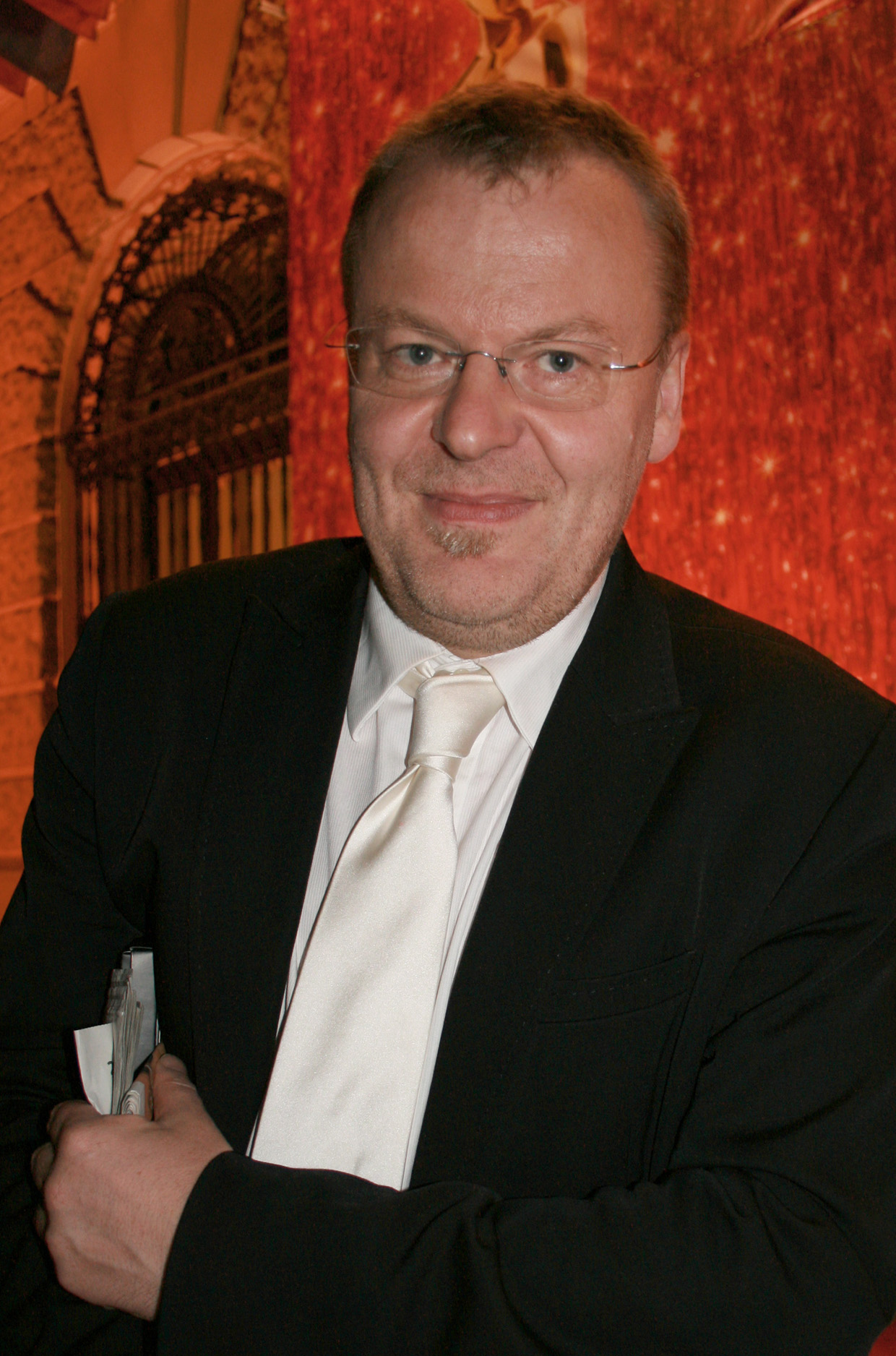
- Stefan Ruzowitzky, 13 April 2008
- Born: 25 December 1961 (age 64); Vienna, Austria
- Occupation: Film director
- Years active: 1996 – present
- Spouse: Birgit Sturm

Stefan Ruzowitzky is an Austrian film director and screenwriter.

== Early life and education ==
Ruzowitzky was born in Vienna and studied theatre studies and history there. Before directing feature films, he made music videos for artists including 'N Sync, the Scorpions, Stefan Raab and Die Prinzen.

== Movie career ==
In 1996, Ruzowitzky presented his first feature film, Tempo, about a group of youths living in Vienna. He was subsequently awarded with the Max Ophüls Preis.

His next feature film, The Inheritors, set in the rural Mühlviertel in Upper Austria, was released in 1998, and was awarded Best Picture at the International Film Festival Rotterdam as well as at the Flanders Film Festival. It also won a prize at the International Film Festival in Valladolid.

In 2000 he directed the successful German horror film Anatomy, starring Franka Potente, and in 2003 the equally well-received sequel Anatomy 2. Ruzowitzky's first international co-production, All the Queen's Men (2001), starring Matt LeBlanc and Eddie Izzard, was received poorly by both critics and viewers.

In 2007 Ruzowitzky's The Counterfeiters premiered at the Berlin International Film Festival and was nominated for a Golden Bear. The film is based on the memories of Adolf Burger, a Jewish Slovak typographer and Holocaust survivor involved in Operation Bernhard. The Counterfeiters, nominated on behalf of Austrian cinema, won the Oscar for Best Foreign Language Film at the 80th Academy Awards on 24 February 2008.

In 2013, he directed the 90-minute non-fiction drama Das radikal Böse, which, by means of authentic letters and interviewing psychology, military, and history experts seeks to explain the mentality of "ordinary" members of Einsatzgruppen and Wehrmacht soldiers that carried out the Holocaust. It was mainly based upon Christopher Browning's 1992 book Ordinary Men, which assigns the efficiency of the German killing machinery to social mechanisms of conformism and peer pressure rather than racial hatred.

His vampire horror film The Last Voyage of the Demeter is based on Bram Stoker's Dracula tale, and the psychological thriller Braincopy.

On 2 May 2014, Deadline Hollywood announced that Ruzowitzky would direct Screen Gems' action-thriller Patient Zero based on an original script by Mike Le. The film stars Matt Smith and Natalie Dormer.

== Filmography ==
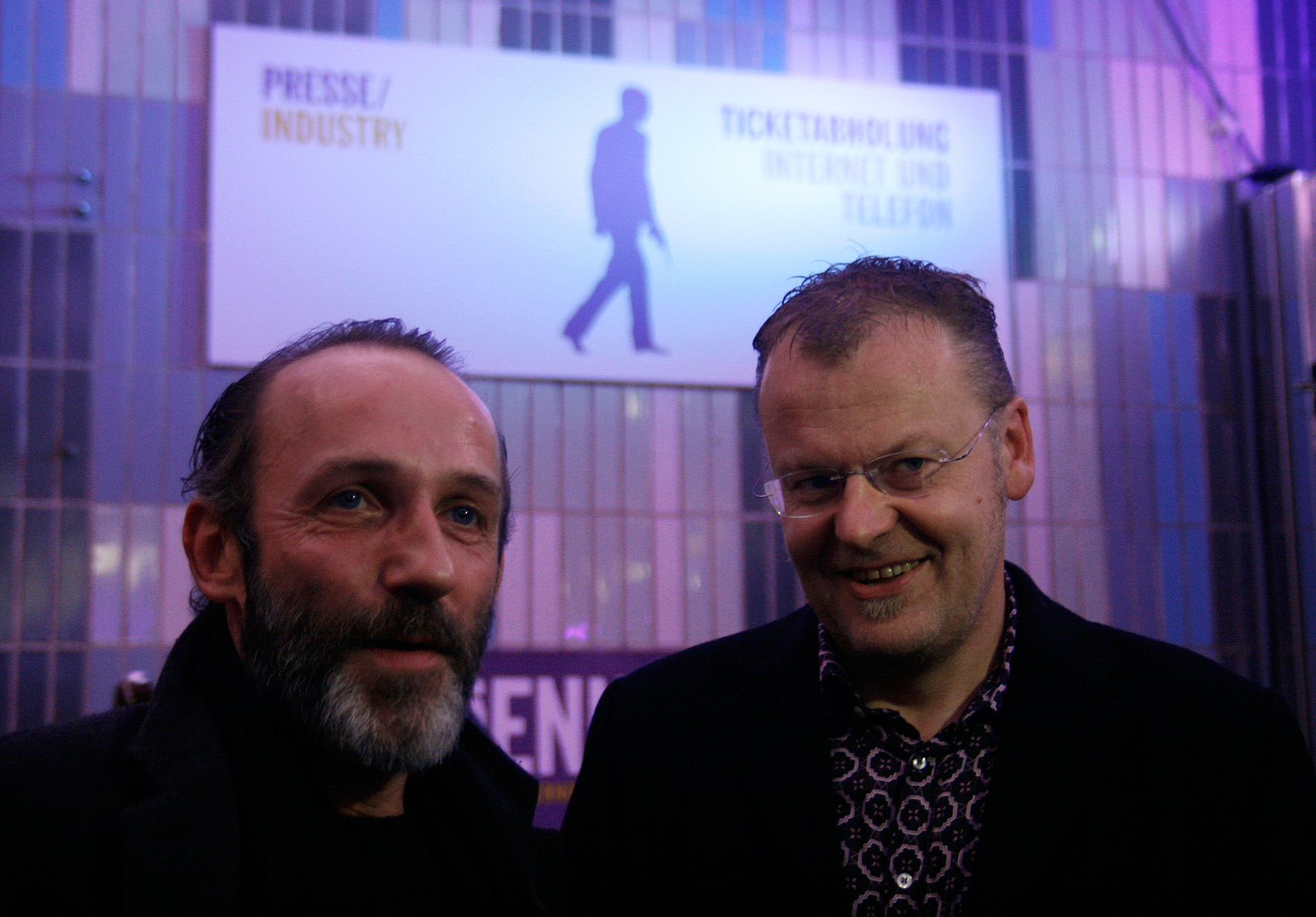
Ruzowitzky with Karl Markovics at the Viennale, Vienna 2009

Year	Title	Director	Writer
1996	Tempo	Yes	Yes
1998	The Inheritors	Yes	Yes
2000	Anatomy	Yes	Yes
2001	All the Queen's Men	Yes	No
2003	Anatomy 2	Yes	Yes
2007	The Counterfeiters	Yes	Yes
2009	Lilly the Witch: The Dragon and the Magic Book	Yes	Yes
2012	Deadfall	Yes	No
2013	Radical Evil	Yes	No
2017	Cold Hell	Yes	No
2018	Patient Zero	Yes	No
2019	8 Tage	Yes	No
2020	Narcissus and Goldmund	Yes	No
2021	Hinterland	Yes	No
2025	Icefall	Yes	No

== Awards ==
- 1998 - The Inheritors, Grand Prix at the 1998 edition of Film Fest Gent
- 2007 – The Counterfeiters, Oscar for Best Foreign Language Film
- 2007 - The Counterfeiters, Grand Prix at the 2007 edition of Film Fest Gent

== Opera ==
In 2010, Ruzowitzky directed his first opera production, Der Freischütz, for Vienna's Theater an der Wien. The cast included his Counterfeiters star Karl Markovics in the non-singing role of Samiel; the production was conducted by Bertrand de Billy.
