= Budapest Opera Ball =

Annual society event in Budapest, Hungary

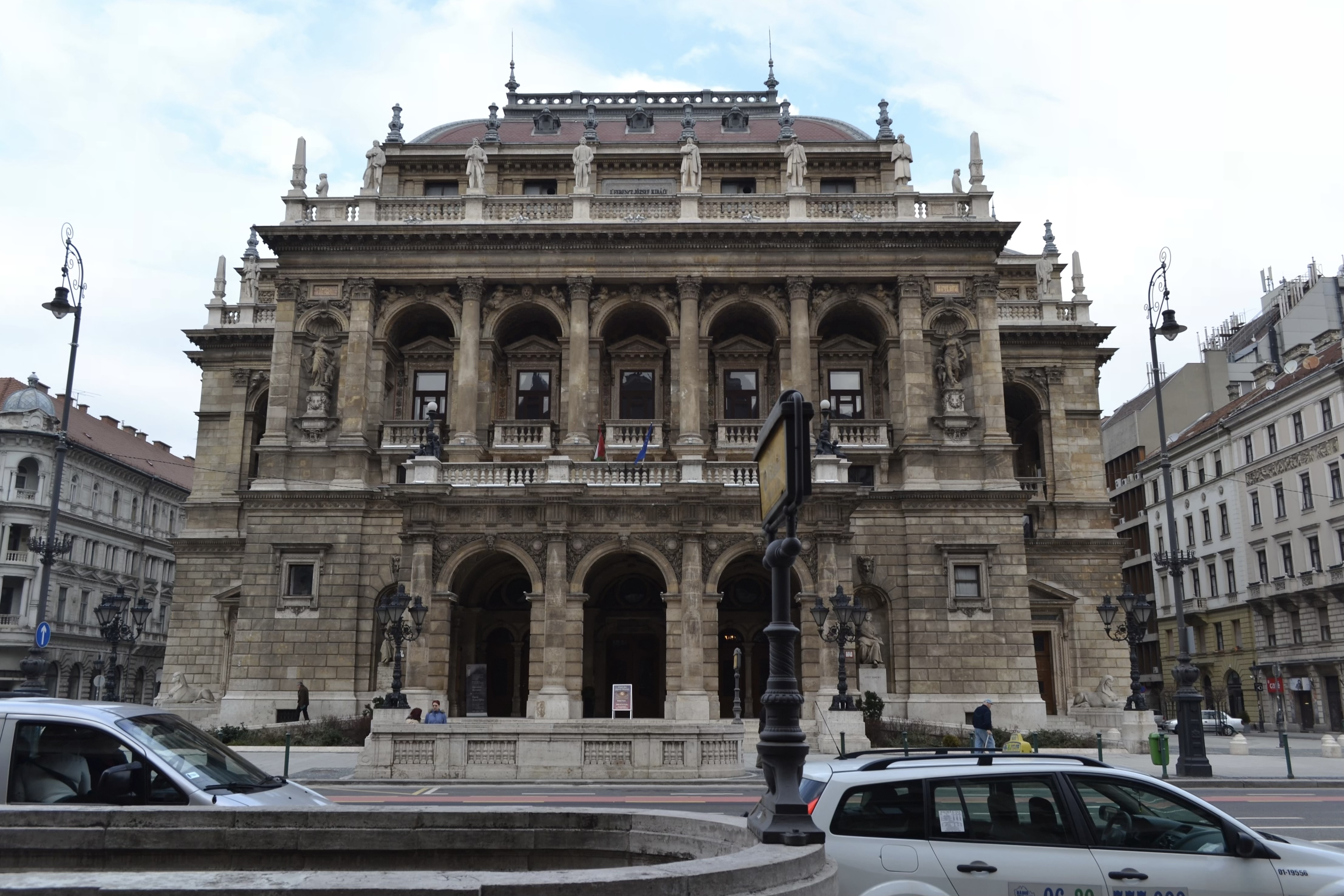
The exterior of the Hungarian State Opera House

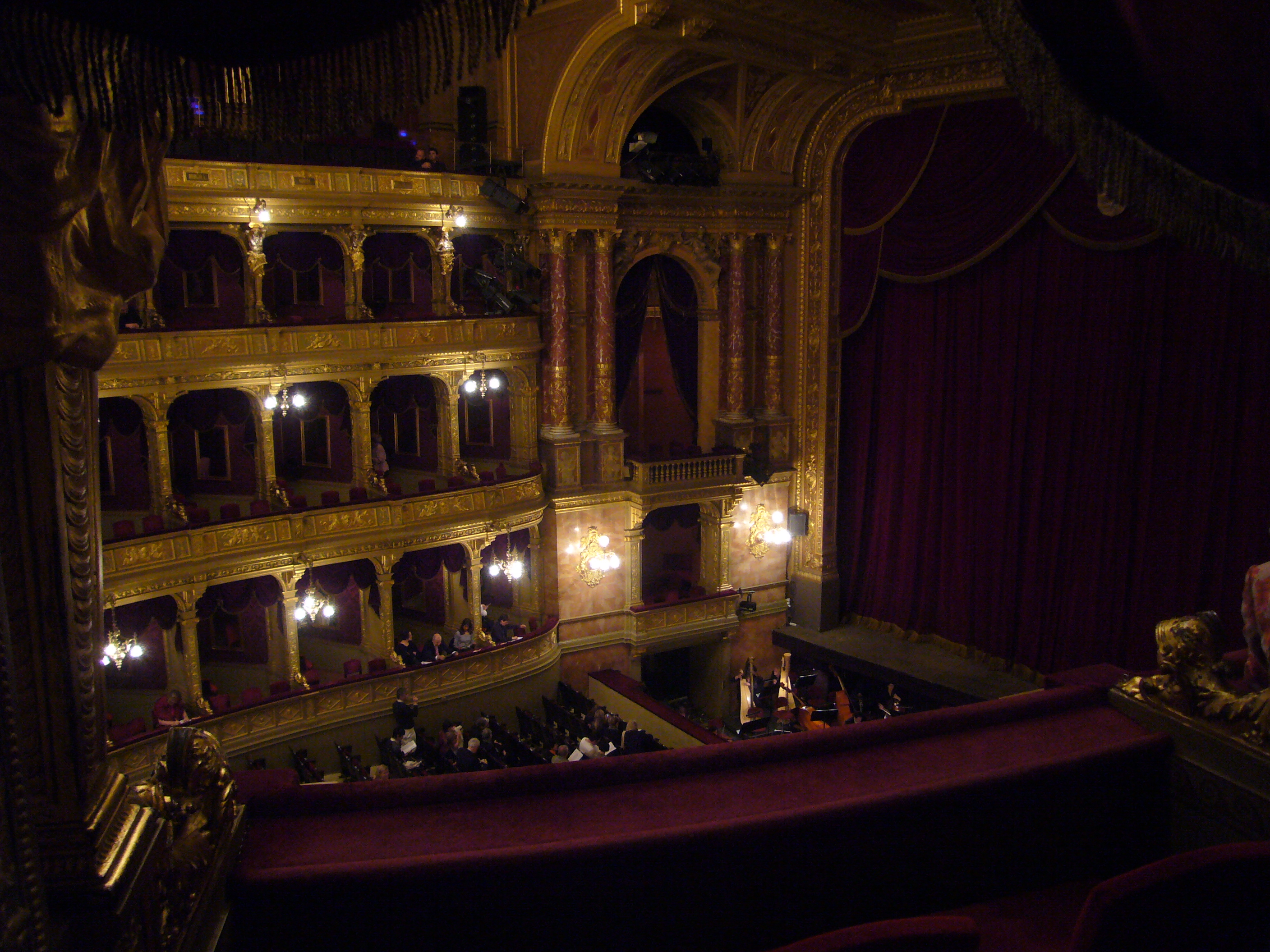
The Neo-Renaissance and Baroque interior of the Opera House

The Budapest Opera Ball (Budapesti Operabál in Hungarian, Budapester Opernball in German) is an annual Hungarian society event taking place in the building of the Hungarian State Opera (Operaház) on the last Saturday of the carnival season, usually late February. By transforming the venue into a ballroom every year, the stage transforms into a cultural display.

== History ==
The Budapest Opera Ball (Budapesti Operabál in Hungarian, Budapester Opernball in German) is an annual Hungarian society event taking place in the building of the Hungarian State Opera (Operaház) on the last Saturday of the carnival season, usually late February. The Hungarian State Opera started construction in 1875 when the building permit was first allocated during the Austro-Hungarian era, but the Budapest Opera ball did not begin until over a century later. While in construction, Franz Josef I expressed concerns regarding the size of the building in comparison to the Vienna State Opera, which caused modifications in the original construction plan, such as reducing the size of the lobby. The Budapest Opera Ball held in this building can be seen as a reclaim of cultural prestige. By transforming the venue into a ballroom every year, the stage turns into a space for national identity and social hierarchy.

The Opera Ball was first organised on March 2, 1886. Suspended in 1934, it was not revived until 1996. Representing a tradition rooted in Austrian-Hungarian culture of the 1880s, the revival has become the most prestigious meeting point of the participants of the Hungarian public life, fully covered by national media.

== The Ball Experience ==
The dress code is evening dress: white tie and tailcoat for men, floor-length gowns for women. The ball is opened by more than a hundred debutante dancers after a show consisting of selected arias, followed by the Alles Walzer with people dancing until dawn. The phrase “Alles Walzer,” after the opening ceremony indicates to the guests that the dance floor is now open to all. Recent international guests include Montserrat Caballé, Ornella Muti, Yevgeny Nesterenko, Walter Berry, Heinz Zednik, Katia Ricciarelli, Patrizio Buanne, Catherine Deneuve, Katarina Witt, Gina Lollobrigida, Daryl Hannah, and Guy de Rothschild. Besides such guests as these, the balls are highlighted by the best-known Hungarian opera singers.

== Past Events and Cancellations ==
In 2010, the number of the official ball included Zoltán Mága and his Orchestra, Somos novios, excerpts from Vampires’ Ball (a musical), The Presentation of the Silver Rose and Soneto IV (both conducted by José Cura), and the Debutantes dance to the Frühlungsstimmen waltz by Johann Strauss II. Ildikó Komlósi was the star guest of the year who performed Lippenschweigen from The Merry Widow by Franz Lehár. The rooms that are reportedly open to guests during the ball include the Zwack Café with jazz music, the Törley Cocktail Bar, and the Pub directly adjacent to the Ball Room.

In 2011, a charity Gala Concert was substituted for the Opera Ball with as a gesture "of contribution to the work of the Government, the leading institutions and the citizens" to help those Hungarians afflicted by the ongoing financial crisis and the various natural disasters. In 2015, the guests contributed to the purchase of an ambulance for the Hungarian National Emergency Ambulance Service.

In 2018, the Ball cancelled over 15 planned performances of Billy Elliot after accusations that the show would promote homosexuality among viewers. The conservative media outlet publicized claims that the musical, which tells the story of a boy immersed in poverty who finds purpose in ballet, promoted non-traditional gender roles. The press report led to 15 of 44 performances being cut.

== See also ==
- Opernball (disambiguation)
