= Euphoria =

Intense feelings of well-being

Euphoria (/juːˈfɔːriə/ yoo-FOR-ee-ə) is the experience (or affect) of pleasure or excitement and intense feelings of well-being and happiness. Certain natural rewards and social activities, such as aerobic exercise, laughter, listening to or making music and dancing, can induce a state of euphoria. Euphoria is also a symptom of certain neurological or neuropsychiatric disorders, such as mania. Romantic love and components of the human sexual response cycle are also associated with the induction of euphoria. Certain drugs, many of which are addictive, can cause euphoria, which at least partially motivates their recreational use.

Hedonic hotspots – i.e., the pleasure centers of the brain – are functionally linked. Activation of one hotspot results in the recruitment of the others. Inhibition of one hotspot results in the blunting of the effects of activating another hotspot. Therefore, the simultaneous activation of every hedonic hotspot within the reward system is believed to be necessary for generating the sensation of an intense euphoria.

== History ==
The word "euphoria" is derived from the Ancient Greek terms εὐφορία: εὖ eu meaning "well" and φέρω pherō meaning "to bear". It is semantically opposite to dysphoria.

A 1706 English dictionary defines euphoria as "the well bearing of the Operation of a Medicine, i.e., when the patient finds himself eas'd or reliev'd by it".

During the 1860s, the English physician Thomas Laycock described euphoria as the feeling of bodily well-being and hopefulness; he noted its misplaced presentation in the final stage of some terminal illnesses and attributed such euphoria to neurological dysfunction. Sigmund Freud's 1884 monograph Über Coca described (his own) consumption of cocaine producing "the normal euphoria of a healthy person", while about 1890 the German neuropsychiatrist Carl Wernicke lectured about the "abnormal euphoria" in patients with mania.

A 1903 article in The Boston Daily Globe refers to euphoria as "pleasant excitement" and "the sense of ease and well-being". In 1920 Popular Science magazine described euphoria as "a high sounding name" meaning "feeling fit": normally making life worth living, motivating drug use, and ill formed in certain mental illnesses. Robert S. Woodworth's 1921 textbook Psychology: A study of mental life, describes euphoria as an organic state which is the opposite of fatigue, and "means about the same as feeling good".

In 1940, The Journal of Psychology defined euphoria as a "state of general well being ... and pleasantly toned feeling". A decade later, finding ordinary feelings of well being difficult to evaluate, American addiction researcher Harris Isbell redefined euphoria as behavioral changes and objective signs typical of morphine. However, in 1957 British pharmacologist D. A. Cahal did not regard opioid euphoria as medically undesirable but an effect which "enhance[s] the value of a major analgesic". The 1977 edition of A Concise Encyclopaedia of Psychiatry called euphoria "a mood of contentment and well-being," with pathologic associations when used in a psychiatric context. As a sign of cerebral disease, it was described as bland and out of context, representing an inability to experience negative emotion.

In the 21st century, euphoria is generally defined as a state of great happiness, well-being and excitement, which may be normal, or abnormal and inappropriate when associated with psychoactive drugs, manic states, or brain disease or injury.

== Neuropsychology ==
Hedonic hotspots are functionally interrelated neural substrates/structures that (intrinsically or extrinsically) generate the feelings of pleasure. Activation of one hedonic hotspot involves the stimulation of the others. Inhibition of one hedonic hotspot blunts the activation the other ones. Therefore, the simultaneous activation of every hedonic hotspot within the reward system is probably necessary for generating the sensation of euphoria.

== Types ==
Many different types of stimuli can induce euphoria, including psychoactive drugs, natural rewards, and social activities. Affective disorders such as unipolar mania or bipolar disorder can involve euphoria as a symptom.

=== Exercise-induced ===
Continuous exercise can produce a transient state of euphoria – an emotional state involving the experience of pleasure and feelings of profound contentment, elation, and well-being – which is colloquially known as a "runner's high" in distance running or a "rower's high" in rowing.

=== Music-induced ===
Euphoria can occur as a result of dancing to music, music-making, and listening to emotionally arousing music. Neuroimaging studies have demonstrated that the reward system plays a central role in mediating music-induced pleasure. Pleasurable emotionally arousing music strongly increases dopamine neurotransmission in the dopaminergic pathways that project to the striatum (i.e., the mesolimbic pathway and nigrostriatal pathway). Approximately 5% of the population experiences a phenomenon termed "musical anhedonia", in which individuals do not experience pleasure from listening to emotionally arousing music despite having the ability to perceive the intended emotion that is conveyed in passages of music.

A clinical study from January 2019 that assessed the effect of a dopamine precursor (levodopa), dopamine antagonist (risperidone), and a placebo on reward responses to music – including the degree of pleasure experienced during musical chills, as measured by changes in electrodermal activity as well as subjective ratings – found that the manipulation of dopamine neurotransmission bidirectionally regulates pleasure cognition (specifically, the hedonic impact of music) in human subjects. This research suggests that increased dopamine neurotransmission acts as a sine qua non condition for pleasurable hedonic reactions to music in humans.

=== Sex-induced ===
The various stages of copulation may also be described as inducing euphoria in some people. Various analysts have described either the entire sexual act, the moments leading to orgasm, or the orgasm itself as the pinnacle of human pleasure or euphoria.

=== Drug-induced ===
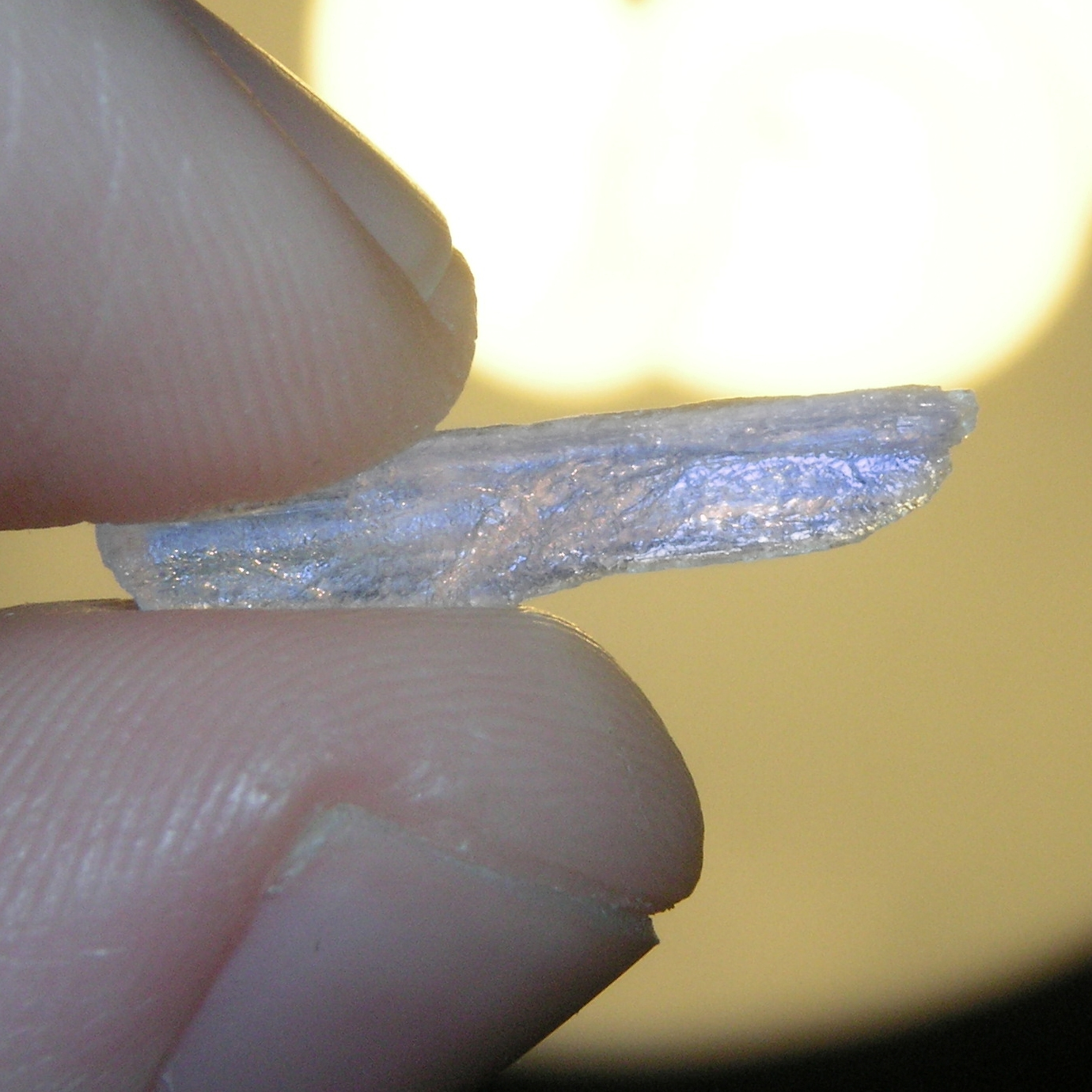
A large dose of methamphetamine causes a drug-induced euphoria.

A euphoriant is a type of psychoactive drug which tends to induce euphoria. Most euphoriants are addictive drugs due to their reinforcing properties and ability to activate the brain's reward system.

==== Stimulants ====
Dopaminergic stimulants like amphetamine, methamphetamine, cocaine, and methylphenidate are euphoriants. Nicotine is a parasympathetic stimulant that acts as a mild euphoriant in some people. Xanthines such as caffeine and theobromine may also be considered mild euphoriants by some.

Chewing areca nut (seeds from the Areca catechu palm) with slaked lime (calcium hydroxide) – a common practice in South- and Southeast Asia – produces stimulant effects and euphoria. The major psychoactive ingredients – arecoline (a muscarinic receptor partial agonist) and arecaidine (a GABA reuptake inhibitor) – are responsible for the euphoric effect.

==== Depressants ====
Certain depressants can produce euphoria; some of those drugs in this class include alcohol in moderate doses, γ-hydroxybutyric acid (GHB), and ketamine.

Some barbiturates and benzodiazepines may cause euphoria. Euphoriant effects are determined by the drug's speed of onset, increasing dose, and with intravenous administration. Barbiturates more likely to cause euphoria include amobarbital, secobarbital and pentobarbital. Benzodiazepines more likely to cause euphoria are flunitrazepam, alprazolam, clobazam, and clonazepam. Benzodiazepines also tend to enhance opioid-induced euphoria.

Pregabalin induces dose-dependent euphoria. Occurring in a small percentage of individuals at recommended doses, euphoria is increasingly frequent at supratherapeutic doses (or with intravenous- or nasal administration). At doses five times the maximum recommended, intense euphoria is reported. Another GABA analogue, gabapentin, may induce euphoria. Characterized as opioid-like but less intense, it may occur at supratherapeutic doses, or in combination with other drugs, such as opioids or alcohol. Ethosuximide and perampanel can also produce euphoria at therapeutic doses.

==== Opioids ====
μ-Opioid receptor agonists are a set of euphoriants that include drugs such as heroin, morphine, codeine, oxycodone, and fentanyl. By contrast, κ-opioid receptor agonists, like the endogenous neuropeptide dynorphin, are known to cause dysphoria, a mood state opposite to euphoria that involves feelings of profound discontent.

==== Cannabinoids ====
Cannabinoid receptor 1 agonists are a group of euphoriants that includes certain plant-based cannabinoids (e.g., THC from the cannabis plant), endogenous cannabinoids (e.g., anandamide), and synthetic cannabinoids.

==== Inhalants ====
Certain gases, like nitrous oxide (N_{2}O, aka "laughing gas"), can induce euphoria when inhaled.

==== Psychedelics ====
Traditional psychedelic drugs, such as LSD and psilocybin are capable of inducing euphoria despite lacking addictive qualities. The Global Drug Survey has revealed that out of 22,000 participant reports, MDMA, LSD, and psilocybin mushrooms were ranked most positively on the Net Pleasure Index of all recreational drugs included in the study.

==== Glucocorticoids ====
Acute exogenous glucocorticoid administration is known to produce euphoria, but this effect is not observed with long-term exposure.

==== List of euphoriants by mechanism of action ====
The following is a full list of euphoriant or rewarding/reinforcing drugs:

- GABA_{A} receptor PAMs (e.g., alcohol, benzodiazepines, Z-drugs, barbiturates, ) and agonists (e.g., muscimol, gaboxadol)
- Nicotinic acetylcholine receptor agonists (e.g., nicotine)
- Classical dopamine reuptake inhibitors (e.g., cocaine, methylphenidate) and dopamine releasing agents (e.g., amphetamine, methamphetamine) (psychostimulants)
- μ-Opioid receptor agonists (opioids) (e.g., morphine, heroin, fentanyl, hydrocodone, oxycodone)
- Cannabinoid CB_{1} receptor agonists (cannabinoids) (e.g., Δ^{9}-THC, nabilone)
- NMDA receptor antagonists (dissociatives) (e.g., ketamine, phencyclidine, nitrous oxide, dextromethorphan)
- Gabapentinoids (α_{2}δ ligands) (e.g., gabapentin, pregabalin, baclofen, and phenibut)
- γ-Hydroxybutyrate (GHB) and analogues (GHB and GABA_{B} receptor agonists) (e.g., GHB, GBL, 1,4-BD)
- AMPA receptor antagonists (e.g., perampanel)
- Serotonin releasing agents (entactogens) (e.g., MDMA, MBDB, MDAI, MEAI)
- Serotonergic psychedelics (non-selective serotonin receptor agonists) (e.g., LSD, psilocybin, mescaline, DMT) (mixed/variable and non-addictive)
- Glucocorticoid receptor agonists (glucocorticoids or corticosteroids) (e.g., hydrocortisone, dexamethasone)

=== Fasting-induced ===
Fasting has been associated with improved mood, well-being, and sometimes euphoria. Various mechanisms have been proposed and possible applications in treating depression considered.

=== Neuropsychiatric ===
==== Mania ====
Euphoria is also strongly associated with both hypomania and mania, mental states characterized by a pathological heightening of mood, which may be either euphoric or irritable, in addition to other symptoms, such as pressured speech, flight of ideas, and grandiosity.

Although hypomania and mania are syndromes with multiple etiologies (that is, ones that may arise from any number of conditions), they are most commonly seen in bipolar disorder, a psychiatric illness characterized by alternating periods of mania and depression.

==== Epilepsy ====
Euphoria may occur during auras of seizures typically originating in the temporal lobe, but affecting the anterior insular cortex. This euphoria is symptomatic of a rare syndrome called ecstatic seizures, often also involving mystical experiences. Euphoria (or more commonly dysphoria) may also occur in periods between epileptic seizures. This condition, interictal dysphoric disorder, is considered an atypical affective disorder. Persons who experience feelings of depression or anxiety between or before seizures occasionally experience euphoria afterwards.

==== Migraine ====
Some persons experience euphoria in the prodrome – hours to days before the onset – of a migraine headache. Similarly, a euphoric state occurs in some persons following the migraine episode.

==== Multiple sclerosis ====
Euphoria sometimes occurs in persons with multiple sclerosis as the illness progresses. This euphoria is part of a syndrome originally called euphoria sclerotica, which typically includes disinhibition and other symptoms of cognitive and behavioral dysfunction.

==== Gender euphoria ====
Gender euphoria is satisfaction or enjoyment felt by a person due to consistency between their gender identity and gendered features associated with a gender different to the sex they were assigned at birth. It is considered to be the positive counterpart of gender dysphoria. Related euphorias have also been recorded in studies of alignments between sexual identity and social recognition such as support in schools for lesbian and gay people, and experiences of intersex variation and their diagnoses such as receiving a diagnosis of congenital adrenal hyperplasia which explained physical differences for example.

== See also ==
- Peak experience

Psychological

- Dysphoria
- Euthymia
- Hyperthymia
- Sense of wonder

Pharmacological

- Anxiolytic
- Designer drug
- Recreational drug use
