= Opernball (film) =

1998 film

- Written by: Josef Haslinger
- Directed by: Urs Egger
- Starring: Heiner Lauterbach; Franka Potente
- Country of origin: Austria; Germany
- Original language: German

Original release
- Release: 1998

Opernball (Opera Ball) is a 1998 made-for-TV movie by Urs Egger based on a 1995 novel by Austrian writer Josef Haslinger in which thousands of people are killed in a Neo-Nazi terrorist attack taking place during the Vienna Opera Ball. The film starred Heiner Lauterbach, Franka Potente, Frank Giering, Caroline Goodall, Richard Bohringer, Gudrun Landgrebe and Désirée Nosbusch.
