= The Inheritors (1998 film) =

1998 film

The Inheritors (Die Siebtelbauern)
- Directed by: Stefan Ruzowitzky
- Written by: Stefan Ruzowitzky
- Produced by: Danny Krausz; Kurt Stocker
- Starring: Simon Schwarz; Sophie Rois
- Cinematography: Peter von Haller
- Edited by: Britta Nahler
- Music by: Erik Satie
- Production company: Dor Film
- Distributed by: Stratosphere Entertainment (US); Metrodome Distribution (UK)
- Release date: 19 June 1998 (Austria)
- Running time: 95 minutes
- Countries: Austria; Germany
- Language: German

The Inheritors (original German title Die Siebtelbauern 'The Seventh-Part Farmers') is a 1998 Austrian-German film directed by Stefan Ruzowitzky. It stars Simon Schwarz and Sophie Rois and has won numerous awards. The film was selected as the Austrian entry for the Best Foreign Language Film at the 71st Academy Awards, but was not accepted as a nominee.

== Plot ==
In a remote valley in Austria in the early 20th century a curmudgeonly farmer dies. While he was a hard and even abusive taskmaster to his farmhands, he was also hostile to his neighbours. Without family, he left his farm, livestock and belongings to his farmhands, rather than to the church as expected. While three leave, demanding their share, the others stay to run it as a shared venture. Wealthy local farmers, feeling threatened by this subversive example, try to subvert the farm. The film contains graphic violence.

== Cast ==
- Simon Schwarz as Lukas Lichtmeß
- Sophie Rois as Emmy
- Lars Rudolph as Severen
- Tilo Prückner as Großknecht
- Ulrich Wildgruber as Danninger

== Reception ==
In 1998, the film won the Grand Prix for Best Film at Film Fest Gent.

== See also ==
- List of submissions to the 71st Academy Awards for Best Foreign Language Film
- List of Austrian submissions for the Academy Award for Best Foreign Language Film
