= All the Queen's Men =

2001 film by Stefan Ruzowitzky

- Directed by: Stefan Ruzowitzky
- Written by: David Schneider
- Produced by: Rainer Virnich; Phil Alden Robinson
- Starring: Matt LeBlanc; Eddie Izzard; James Cosmo; Karl Markovics
- Cinematography: Peter Kappel; Wedigo von Schultzendorff
- Edited by: Rudi Heinen; Nick Moore; Britta Nahler; Andrea Schumacher
- Music by: Uwe Fahrenkrog-Petersen; Robert Folk; Michael Lloyd
- Production company: Streamline
- Distributed by: Filmladen (Austria); Constantin Film (Germany)
- Release dates: October 14, 2001 (U.S. Mill Valley Film Festival); October 25, 2002 (limited); December 13, 2001 (Germany); June 7, 2002 (Austria)
- Running time: 100 minutes
- Countries: Germany; United States; Austria
- Language: English
- Budget: $15 million
- Box office: $121,258

All the Queen's Men is a 2001 English-language action comedy war film directed by Stefan Ruzowitzky and starring Matt LeBlanc and Eddie Izzard. Made on a budget of $15 million, the film received heavily negative reviews from critics, and it earned only $121,258 worldwide.

== Plot ==
During World War II the British army is attempting to retrieve an Enigma machine from Germany. Having failed in previous attempts, they decide to send four men undercover to the factory that makes the devices in Berlin. Unfortunately the factory is populated entirely by women, and they only have men to send. American O'Rourke (LeBlanc), British transvestite Tony Parker (Izzard), genius Johnno (David Birkin), and the reluctant Archie (James Cosmo) are sent to infiltrate the factory dressed as women.

Dropped in the wrong area, the team must first try to find their bearings. Aided by Romy, a sympathiser to their cause, they find their way to the factory. They manage to retrieve the Enigma machine, against the expectations of the British army. Just before they leave Germany, they realize they were tricked—the British government already had the device, but wanted to make the Germans think they were still after it. They were specifically chosen as the team most likely to fail. Leaving Germany with an Enigma machine would, in fact, destroy the usefulness of the machine, as the Germans would know it was stolen and switch to a different code system. Archie volunteers to be captured with the machine to allow the mission to "fail". After he is captured, the team retrieves him and returns safely to England, leaving the Germans with the impression they have all the Enigma machines and the British are still desperate to obtain one.

== Cast ==
- Matt LeBlanc as Captain Steven O'Rourke
- Eddie Izzard as Lieutenant Tony Parker
- James Cosmo as Major Archie Hartley
- Nicolette Krebitz as Romy
- David Birkin as Johnno
- Edward Fox as Aitken
- Karl Markovics as Hauptsturmführer

== Reception ==
The film was panned by critics, getting an approval rating of 7% on review aggregation website Rotten Tomatoes and an average rating of 3.50/10, based on 29 reviews. The website's critical consensus reads, "All the Queen's Men never capitalizes on its gender-bending conceit, instead relying on low-hanging jokes that never elicit a chuckle." Roger Ebert mentioned the film in his book Your Movie Sucks, terming it "a perfectly good idea for a comedy, but it just plain doesn't work." Ebert also mentions the problem with the plot being about retrieving an Enigma machine when "Anyone who has seen Enigma, U-571, or the various TV documentaries...will be aware that by the time of the movie, the British already had possession of an Enigma machine... The movie has an answer to it, but it comes so late in the film that although it makes sense technically, the damage has already been done."

== See also ==
- Cross-dressing in film and television
