= Project anatomy =

A project anatomy (also integration anatomy or organic integration plan) is a tool for integration planning that visualizes dependencies between work items in development projects. It is mainly used in incremental development and Integration Driven Development projects.

== Overview ==
The project anatomy has evolved from the system anatomy and in its purest form the work items (called work packages) reflect the development of system capabilities. Often a more pragmatic approach is taken, though, where work packages may contain other items with important dependencies as well, e.g. HW deliveries for embedded systems.

=== Benefits ===
- Simple
- Easy to grasp view of what to do, what is done and the dependencies between work packages
- Collaborative
- Common view for developers, project managers and sponsors
- Helps in finding and managing risks and delays
- Can be used to manage dependencies between teams and sprints in large agile development projects

=== Limitations ===
- Can include, but not manage, lead time aspects
- Can include, but not manage, resource aspects

== History ==
Project anatomies evolved from system anatomies at Ericsson since the late 1990s. Both the terminology and the methodology have differed between organizations and the difference between "system anatomy", "project anatomy", "delta anatomy" and "integration anatomy" is sometimes diffuse or non-existent. In 2004 FindOut Technologies presented a SW tool (Paipe) for managing anatomies with more properties. The company has, since then, worked to establish the term Project Anatomy.

== Example ==
The project anatomy below is an example showing the work packages needed to develop a simple issue management system.

Work packages with many dependencies are called spiders and indicate a risk. The risk may be managed by splitting the work package or by moving dependants of it to later shipments (increments).

The colors indicate the current status of work packages, where green means "on track", yellow means "at risk" and red means "off track". Blue work packages are done.

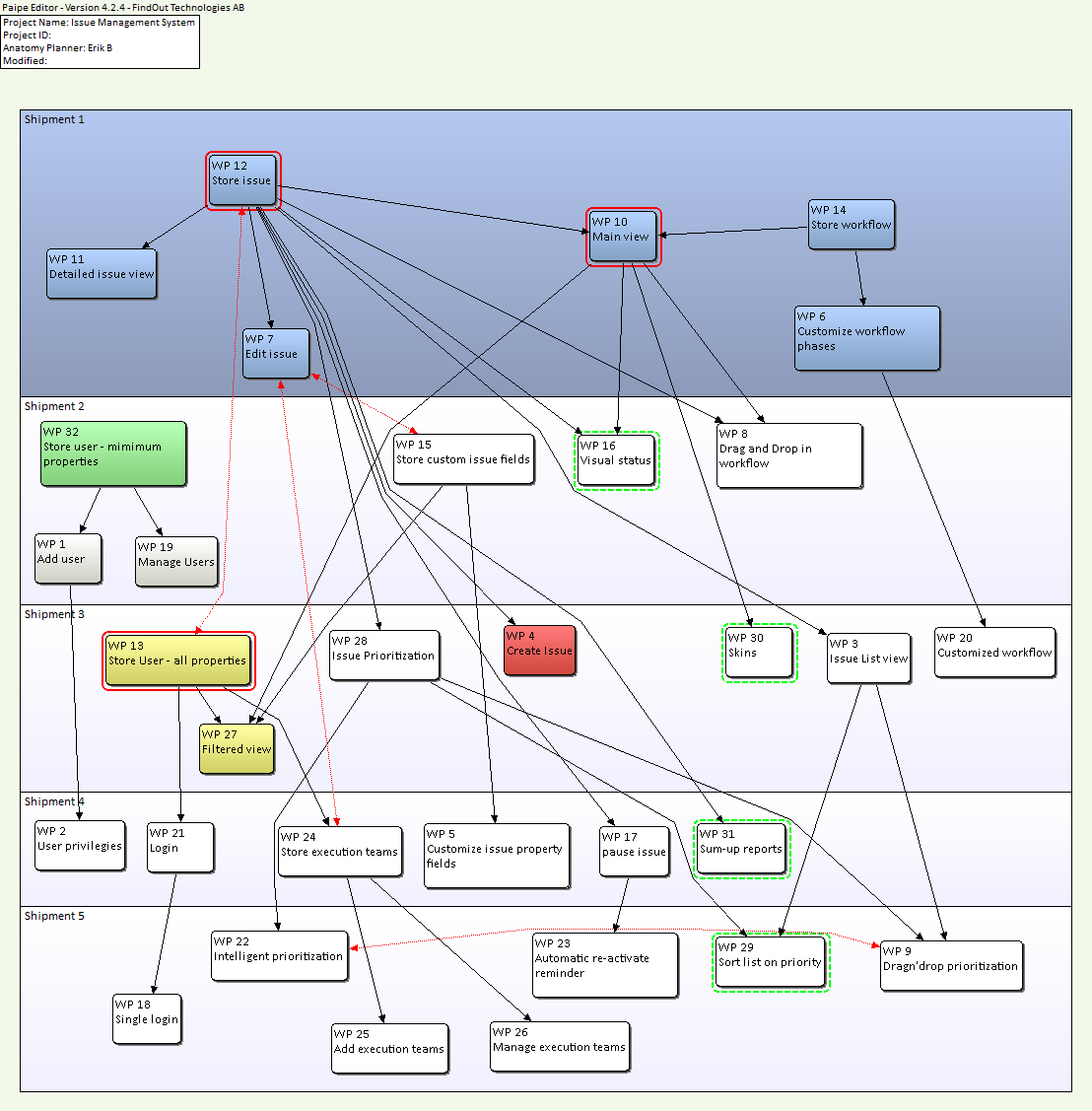
