= Anatomy (film) =

2000 film by Stefan Ruzowitzky

- Theatrical release poster
- Directed by: Stefan Ruzowitzky
- Written by: Stefan Ruzowitzky
- Produced by: Andrea Willson
- Starring: Franka Potente; Benno Fürmann; Anna Loos; Holger Speckhahn; Sebastian Blomberg
- Cinematography: Peter von Haller
- Edited by: Ueli Christen
- Music by: Marius Ruhland
- Production companies: Deutsche Columbia Pictures Filmproduktion; Claussen + Wöbke Filmproduktion
- Distributed by: Columbia TriStar Film Distributors International
- Release dates: 3 February 2000 (Germany); 25 July 2000 (Fantasia); 8 September 2000 (United States)
- Running time: 99 minutes
- Countries: Germany; United States
- Language: German
- Budget: DEM 8,400,000 (estimated)

Anatomy (German: Anatomie) is a 2000 German horror film written and directed by Stefan Ruzowitzky. Starring Franka Potente, the film became the highest-grossing German-language movie in 2000. Columbia Pictures released the film's English-dubbed version in the United States theatrically on 8 September 2000. However, the dubbed version underperformed at the United States box office.

A sequel, Anatomy 2 (Anatomie 2), was released in 2003.

== Plot ==
Medical student Paula Henning wins a place in a summer course at the University of Heidelberg, where her grandfather was a renowned professor. During one of her classes on anatomy, the body of David, a young man whom Paula encountered on her train to Heidelberg, turns up on her dissection table. Her instructor, Professor Grombek, humiliates her by daring her to dissect the heart. Paula finds that David's body bears strange incisions and decides to investigate the mysterious circumstances surrounding his death. As she proceeds to cut a sample for an independent test, she is intrigued to find a triple "A" mark near David's ankle. She is then startled by the school's mortuary attendant, who wants to know if Grombek is aware of her investigation.

Paula finds clues pointing to an ancient secret society, the Anti-Hippocratic Society, which performs gruesome experiments on living people who they deem undesirable. She also comes across research about the rituals that they perform on transgressors of their rules or those who inquire too much. One night, Paula sits on her bed and realizes that it has been soaked in blood, with candles lit underneath, as a sign of warning from the Society. She then attacks a figure that enters her room, but it turns out to be her friend Hein, who is seeking consolation over his recent breakup from his girlfriend Gretchen. While they talk, Paula's boyfriend Casper stops by and storms off when he sees that she is not alone. Hein leaves, apparently more at peace.

As Gretchen and her new boyfriend Phil prepare to have sex in one of the morgue halls, Hein murders Phil in a jealous rage. He then injects Gretchen with a blood-coagulating drug, telling her that he will preserve her body. He is so absorbed in the work that he falls asleep without having disposed of Phil's body. Hein hides it in the morgue and removes the head to prevent identification. The next day, when Paula tries to share her findings about the Society, Hein menacingly tells her that it is dangerous to know too much. Grombek reveals that Paula's grandfather was a member of the Society, and that the drug which he became famous for developing was the result of his experiments in Nazi concentration camps. Paula flees to the hospital to confront her grandfather but is told that he has died.

At the assembly of the Society, Hein expresses no remorse for the murders and defiantly accepts their punishment, slashing himself three times in the face. Grombek takes responsibility for the killings and leaves to call the authorities to arrest Hein. Later, while Paula destroys the diplomas granted to her grandfather, a crazed Hein kills Grombek in his house. Paula gets back to the school but is trapped by Hein and his accomplice, Ludwig. While they are preparing her for preservation, Paula's bindings are partially cut by Casper. She gets loose, poisons Ludwig, and runs away until Hein strikes a high voltage cable and dies. Casper and Paula then escape together.

In a mid-credits scene, two of Paula's classmates praise Hein's abilities in dissection and preservation, discuss Grombek's imminent replacement, and how they will keep a low profile in their respective practices while experimenting for the Anti-Hippocratic Society.

== Cast ==
- Franka Potente as Paula Henning
- Benno Fürmann as Hein
- Rüdiger Vogler as Dr. Henning
- Anna Loos as Gretchen
- Oliver Wnuk as Ludwig
- Arndt Schwering-Sohnrey as David
- Sebastian Blomberg as Caspar
- Holger Speckhahn as Phil
- Traugott Buhre as Prof. Grombek
- Gennadi Vengerov as the Preparateur

== Production ==
Anatomy was the first production made by the German subsidiary of Columbia Pictures. The film was conceived as a commercially oriented genre production influenced by contemporary American mainstream cinema. Writer-director Stefan Ruzowitzky said that the project had been planned from the outset as a mainstream film intended for multiplex audiences, rather than in the style of his earlier films. Columbia planned to release the film in Germany on approximately 400 prints.

Principal photography took place in Munich and Heidelberg from April 7 to June 3, 1999. The production received funding from MFG Medien- und Filmgesellschaft Baden-Württemberg, FilmFernsehFonds Bayern and the German Federal Film Board.

== Release ==
Anatomy opened on 386 screens and grossed 3.9 million Deutsche Marks over the four-day weekend from 320,000 admissions, placing fourth at the German box office. It grossed $10 million in its first six weeks in German-speaking Europe. The film had its North American premiere at the Fantasia International Film Festival on July 25, 2000, where it won a prize in the Best International Film category.

The film attracted more than two million admissions in Germany and became the country's most successful German-language film of 2000. In 2016, Ruzowitzky said that Anatomy remained the most successful German-language genre film.

=== Home media ===
On 27 August 2021, Anatomy made its HD debut when Justbridge Entertainment released the film and its sequel Anatomy 2 in a two-film Blu-ray mediabook. The release included a 20-page booklet by Christoph N. Kellerbach. Additional content for the first film included deleted scenes, a making-of feature, a special make-up feature, and a storyboard-to-scene comparison.

== Reception ==
On Rotten Tomatoes, the film holds an approval rating of 62% based on 13 reviews. On Metacritic, the film has a weighted average score of 33 out of 100, based on 4 critics, indicating "Generally unfavorable reviews".

Dennis Schwartz from Ozus' World Movie Reviews gave the film a grade B, calling it "both eerily written and directed". Stephen Holden from The New York Times gave the film a negative review, stating that the film "lacks the raucous, anything-for-a-shock carnival humor of its American prototypes".

German critics compared Anatomy to American horror films. Katja Nicodemus of Die Tageszeitung criticised the film for adopting conventional American horror clichés without significantly challenging them, and for overexplaining its genre conventions and character backgrounds. Filmdienst described the film as a mixture of slasher horror and psychological thriller, heavily indebted to American genre films.

== Accolades ==
At the German Film Awards in 2000, Anatomy received the audience award for German Film of the Year. Franka Potente also received the audience award for Actor/Actress of the Year for her performance in the film.

== See also ==
- Plastination
