= System anatomy =

Visualisation method for describing information systems

A system anatomy is simple visual description of a system, focusing on the dependencies between system capabilities.

== Overview ==
The system anatomy was first used in a project at Ericsson, and Jack Järkvik is considered the inventor of the concept. After that, the system anatomy and the similar project anatomy (also integration anatomies) have been used widely in different Ericsson projects and now they are being spread to other major companies with complex system development as well.

Anatomies can be said to be a human centric way of describing a system, since they are used as a means to obtain a common view of the system under development.

The anatomies are especially useful in development of large complex systems in incremental and integration driven development, and as a means to coordinate agile development teams.

== Advantages and limitations ==
The system anatomy, unlike its siblings (project anatomy, integration anatomy), is actually just another view of the system, different from product structure modeling, UML diagrams and flowcharts. By focusing on the system's capabilities – both internal and money making ones – and the dependencies between those, the development team gets a common picture of the system to be developed, that is easier to grasp than many other models.

One of the key features of the system anatomy is its simplicity. That, of course, means that the anatomy cannot replace other models or design tools. It is only another way of describing the design, in SW tools, on paper or in the heads of the system engineers.

The system anatomy can be used as a starting point when creating an integration anatomy (a.k.a. project anatomy) that has more use as a project management tool.

== Example ==
The following example is a simplified example of a system anatomy for an issue management system. This anatomy is drawn with the most basic capabilities at the top. The notation is that the capability at the end of the arrow is a dependent of the capability at the beginning. In this example the anatomy also shows development progress (blue boxes).

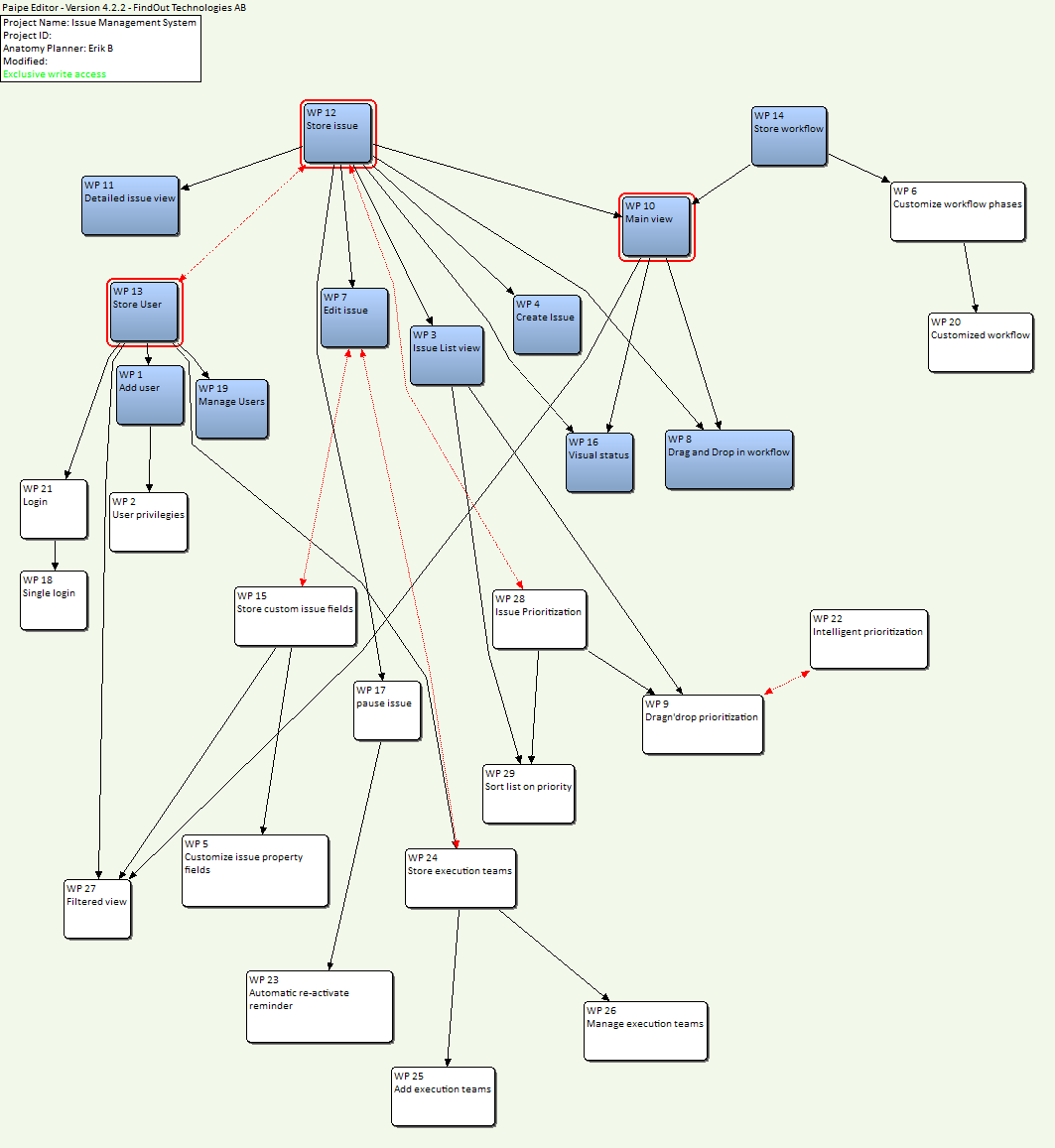
