= Amatory anatomy =

Historical type of English poetry

Amatory anatomy, sometimes referred to simply as "anatomy," is a historical type of English poetry whereby the author describes his or her appreciation for their lover's body parts. The person being described is usually female. This technique is similar to the poetic blason.
