= Gray's Anatomy (disambiguation) =

Gray's Anatomy is a classic human anatomy textbook, first edition (1858) by Henry Gray and Henry Carter.

Gray's Anatomy may refer to:

- Gray's Anatomy (film), 1996 film written by Spalding Gray
- Gray's Anatomy: Selected Writings, a 2009 book by John N. Gray

== See also ==
- Grey's Anatomy, American television series
