= Anatomy 2 =

2003 film by Stefan Ruzowitzky

- Theatrical release poster
- Directed by: Stefan Ruzowitzky
- Written by: Stefan Ruzowitzky
- Produced by: Andrea Willson
- Starring: Barnaby Metschurat; Franka Potente
- Cinematography: Andreas Berger
- Edited by: Hans Funck
- Music by: Marius Ruhland
- Production companies: Deutsche Columbia Pictures Filmproduktion; Claussen + Wöbke Filmproduktion
- Distributed by: Columbia TriStar Film Distributors International
- Release dates: 6 February 2003 (United States); 10 February 2003 (Berlinale)
- Running time: 101 minutes
- Country: Germany
- Language: German

Anatomy 2 (German: Anatomie 2) is a 2003 German thriller film written and directed by Stefan Ruzowitzky. It is the sequel to the 2000 film Anatomy, which starred Franka Potente. The story moves to Berlin for this film.

== Plot ==
The Heidelberg chapter of the Anti-Hippocratic Society for unrestricted medical research has been shut down, but the society still thrives at a prestigious Berlin hospital. The young neurosurgeon Joachim Hauser ("Jo") from Duisburg gets caught up in a research group led by doctor Charles Müller-LaRousse, who urges his students to test their progress on themselves. Jo participates in the trials to eventually help his brother Willi, who has muscular dystrophy. When Jo and some of his fellow students show some reluctance, Dr. Müller-LaRousse uses alternative means to punish them before they can give up the society to Paula Henning, (Note: The main character in Anatomy (2000)) who is now investigating the society for the police.

== Cast ==
- Barnaby Metschurat as Joachim Hauser
- Ariane Schnug as Junge Kellerin
- Herbert Knaup as Prof. Charles Müller-LaRousse
- Wotan Wilke Möhring as Gregor
- Heike Makatsch as Viktoria
- Franka Potente as Paula Henning

== Home media ==
Anatomy 2 was released on DVD by Columbia TriStar on October 14, 2003, and on May 10, 2004. In 2013, it was released on DVD and Blu-ray by Mill Creek Entertainment on May 7 and 14, respectively.

== Reception ==
On Rotten Tomatoes, the film holds a critic approval rating of 29% based on seven reviews, with an average rating of 4.1/10. On Metacritic, the film has a weighted average score of 46 out of 100, based on 5 critics, indicating "mixed or average reviews".

Film critic Derek Elley reviewed the film, saying that it "goes straight for the jugular rather than slowly building atmosphere."
