= Opernball (novel) =

1995 novel by Josef Haslinger

Opernball is a 1995 novel by Austrian writer Josef Haslinger in which thousands of people are killed in a Neo-Nazi terrorist attack taking place during the Vienna Opera Ball. The novel was the basis of a 1998 made-for-TV movie by Urs Egger with the same title.
