= Urs Egger =

Swiss film and television director (1953–2020)

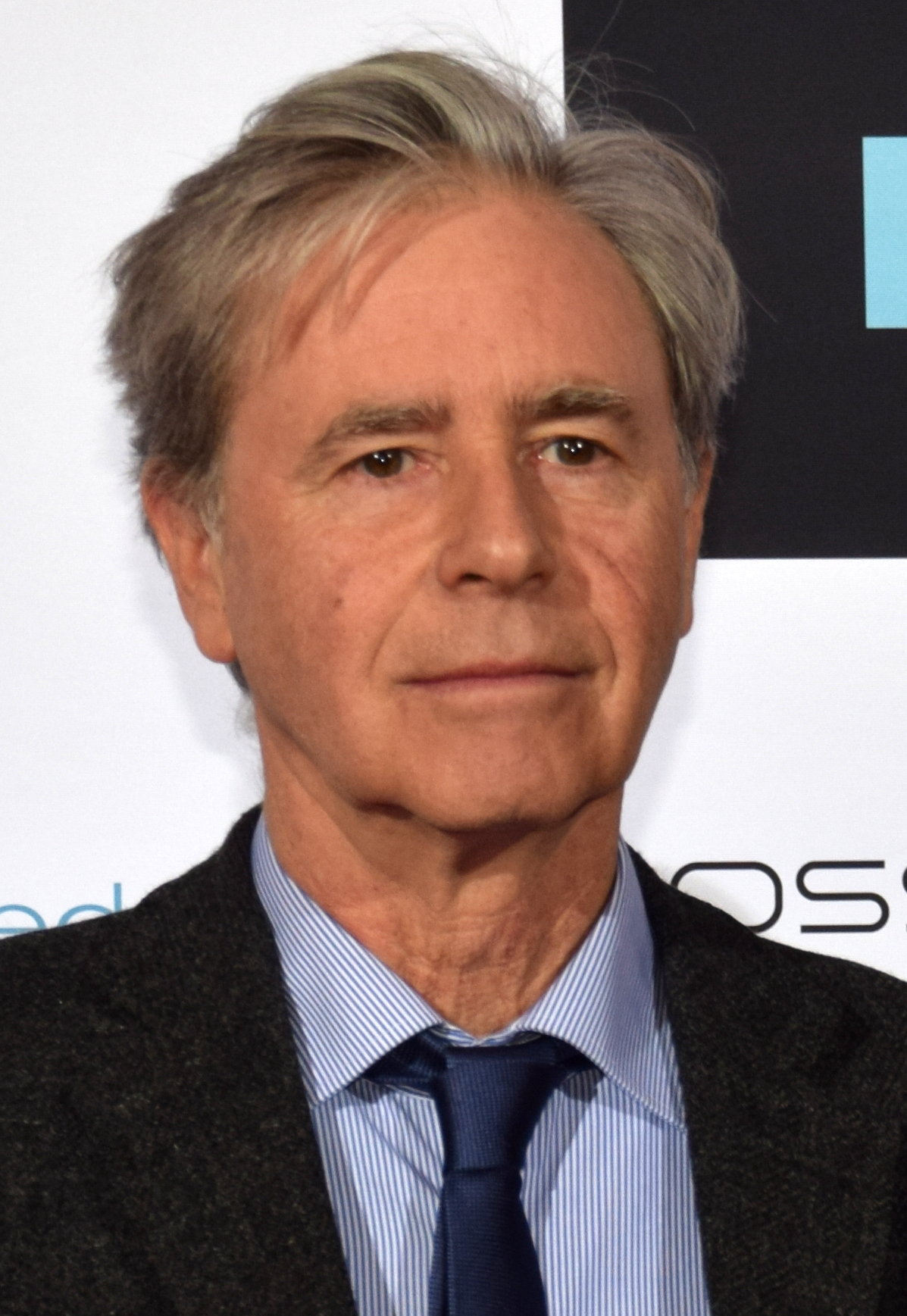
- Urs Egger, 2015
- Born: March 9, 1953; Bern
- Died: January 18, 2020 (aged 66)
- Occupations: Film director, television director, and journalist

Urs Egger (born 9 March 1953 in Bern – died 18 January 2020 in Berlin) was a Swiss film and television director.

From 1974 to 1997, he worked for the Swiss Neue Zürcher Zeitung and the Australian Cinema Papers as a correspondent from Los Angeles, responsible for reporting on the film industry. He visited the American Film Institute to become a director.

== Early life and education ==
Egger was born in Bern, Switzerland. he studied at the University of California, Los Angeles. He then worked as a film correspondent in Los Angeles for several publications, including the Neue Zürcher Zeitung. In 1976–77 he took the directing class at the American Film Institute's Center for Advanced Film Studies.

== Career ==
Egger began making his own films in Switzerland from 1980, starting with the short Go West, Young Man (1980). His other early work included Motten im Licht (1986) and the documentary Bilder vom Maler (1987). He assisted directors including John Frankenheimer, John Glen, Nicolas Gessner and Yves Boisset. His credits in this role include Boisset's spy film Espion, lève-toi (1982) and the James Bond film The Living Daylights (1987). He directed the Tatort episode "Howalds Fall" (1990). He was also second-unit director on Willy Bogner's action film Feuer, Eis & Dynamit (1990).

Egger's breakthrough came with Kinder der Landstrasse (1992), a Swiss–German–Austrian historical drama. It follows a Yenish family in Switzerland during and after the Second World War. He directed the film and co-wrote it with Johannes Bösiger. The film had its international premiere at the Locarno Film Festival. It then won the Grand Jury Prize and the Best Actress award at the Amiens International Film Festival, and it is regarded as a classic of new Swiss cinema.

=== Television ===
Egger's television work included two adaptations of novels by Henning Mankell: Die Rückkehr des Tanzlehrers (2004) and Kennedys Hirn (2010). He also made the crime drama Tod eines Keilers (2005) and An die Grenze (2007), a drama about border guards on the Inner German border. Der Fall Bruckner (2014) starred Corinna Harfouch as a youth welfare officer who investigates a suspected case of child abuse on her own. It won a Grimme-Preis and the German Television Award for Best Direction. Ein Kind wird gesucht (2017) drew on a real 2010 missing-child case. It won the audience award at the German TV crime festival in Wiesbaden. He also directed the opening episode of the ZDF crime series München Mord (2014).

== Personal life and death ==
Egger lived in Berlin from 1994. He kept working until shortly before his death. He died in Berlin on 18 January 2020, aged 66, three months after his last film was first broadcast on Arte. His death came only days after Das Wunder von Wörgl was nominated for the Grimme-Preis.

== Select filmography ==
- Kinder der Landstrasse (1992)
- The Tourist (1996, TV film)
- Teenage Wolfpack (1996, TV film) — remake of Teenage Wolfpack
- Opernball (1998, TV film) — based on Opernball
- Epstein's Night (2002)
- Die Rückkehr des Tanzlehrers (2004, TV film) — based on The Return of the Dancing Master
- An die Grenze (2007, TV film)
- Ten: Umbra Mortis (2008, TV film)
- Kennedy's Brain (2010, TV film) — based on Kennedy's Brain
- Murder Is No Fairy Tale (2010, TV film) — based on the novel Brother Grimm by Craig Russell
- Residual Risk (2011, TV film)
- The Other Child (2013, TV film)
- Crocodile (2013, TV film)
- Madame Nobel (2014, TV film)
- Letter to My Life (2015, TV film)
- Gotthard (2016, TV film)
- Shillings from Heaven (2018, TV film)

== Awards and nominations ==
Year	Award	Category	Work	Result
1992	Amiens International Film Festival	Grand Jury Prize	Kinder der Landstrasse	Won
1998	Austrian Golden Screen	Best TV Movie	Opernball	Won
1998	Golden Gong	Best Direction	Opernball	Won
1999	Monte-Carlo Television Festival	Golden Nymph – Best Mini-Series	Opernball	Won
1999	Monte-Carlo Television Festival	Silver Nymph – Best Direction	Opernball	Won
1999	Chicago International Film Festival	Gold Plaque	Opernball	Won
—	Grimme-Preis	—	Opernball	Nominated
—	Grimme-Preis	—	Tod eines Keilers	Nominated
—	Grimme-Preis	—	An die Grenze	Won
—	Grimme-Preis	—	Der Fall Bruckner	Won
—	German Television Award	Best Direction	Der Fall Bruckner	Won
2019	Romy	Best TV Film	Das Wunder von Wörgl	Won
2020	Grimme-Preis	—	Das Wunder von Wörgl	Nominated
