= Zoltán Mága =

Hungarian violinist (born 1974)

Mága Zoltán
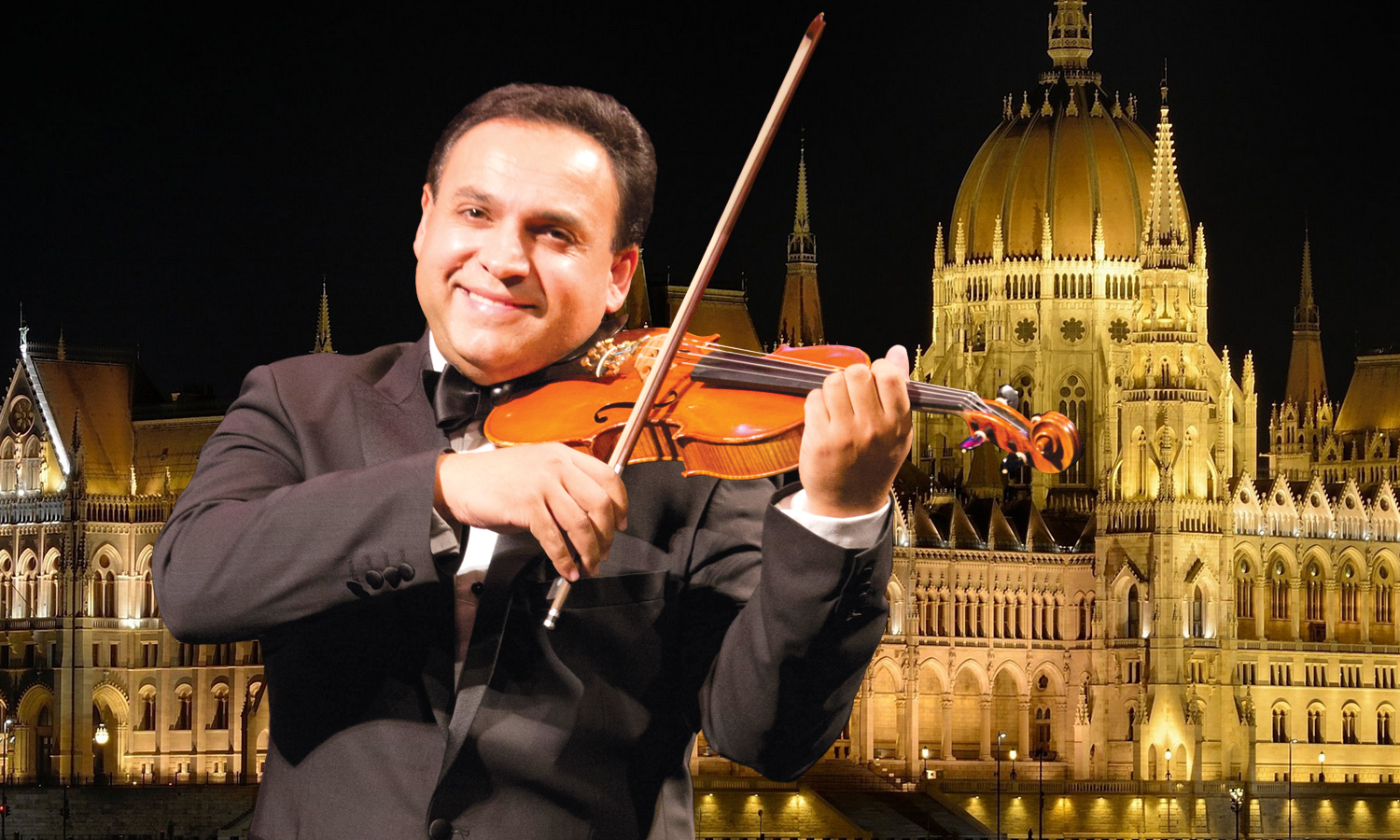

Background information
- Born: 19 February 1974 (age 51); Szolnok
- Occupation: Musician
- Instrument: Violin
- Website: www.magazoltan.com

Zoltán Mága (born 19 February 1974 in Szolnok) is a Hungarian violinist whose repertoire includes classical, folk, pop, and jazz pieces.

== Career ==
He was born into a Hungarian Romani musician family. He was six when he got his first violin. When he was twelve years old, he became the first violinist of the Rajkó Orchestra. In 1996, he founded the Budapest Gipsy Band. Since 2000, he has played at the Hungarian Moulin Rouge, where he was the folk music leader until 2003.

He supports a number of charitable initiatives and is the founder of the Golden Violin Foundation.

== Discography ==
- Moulin Rouge (2002, Tom Tom)
- Mága Zoltán és az Angyalok (2003, EMI)
- Filmzenék csillagai (2006, Warner-Magneoton)
- Budapesti újévi koncert (2008, Warner)
- A királyok hegedűse (2009, Warner)

== Awards ==
- Mexikói Világzenei Fesztivál közönségdíja (2003)
- Magyar Köztársasági Arany Érdemkereszt (2004)
- Kisebbségekért Díj (2005)
- A vizek kártételei elleni védekezésért érdemérem (2006)
- Európa-díj (2007)
- Máltai Lovagrend Érdemrendjének Nagykeresztje (2007)
- A Magyar Köztársasági Érdemrend lovagkeresztje (2007)
- Budapesti Operettszínház örökös tagja (2007)
- Budapestért Díj (2009)
- Közép-Magyarország Pest megyei Prima díj, előadóművész kategória (2009)
- Szolnok díszpolgára (2010)
- Prima díj (2011)
- Prima Primissima Közönségdíj (2011)
- Mindszenty-emlékérem (2011)
- Budapest díszpolgára (2012)
- Magyar Jótékonysági Díj (2013)
- Világ Magyarságáért-díj (2014)
- Pro Caritate-díj (2015)

== Knighthoods ==
- Máltai Lovagrend (2007)
- Magyar Kultúra Lovagja (2008)
