= Franka Potente =

German actress (born 1974)

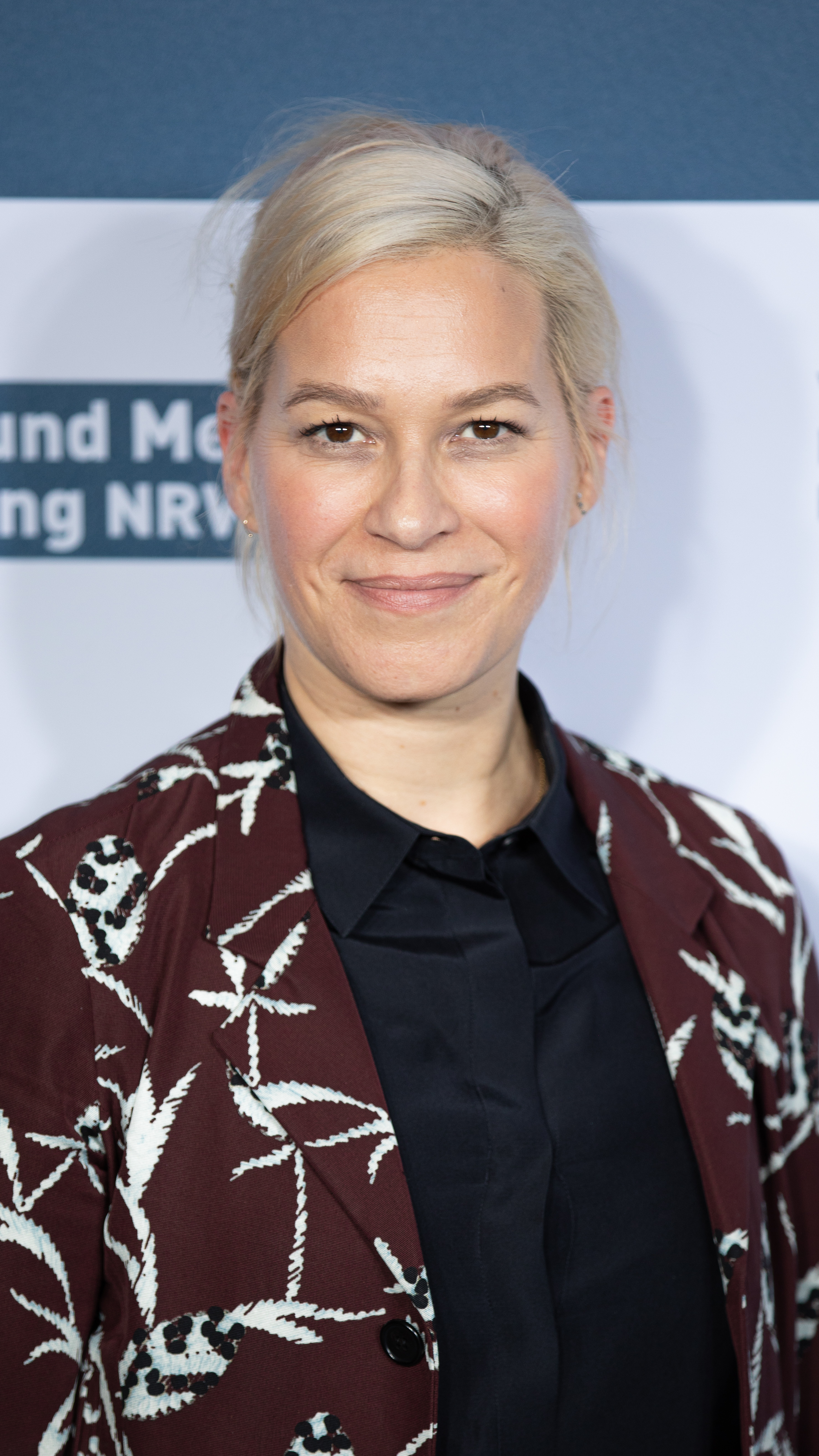
- Potente in 2019
- Born: 22 July 1974 (age 52); Münster, North Rhine-Westphalia, West Germany
- Occupation: Actress
- Years active: 1995–present
- Spouse: Derek Richardson (m. 2012)
- Children: 2

Franka Potente (German: [fʁaŋka poˈtɛn.tə]; born 22 July 1974) is a German actress. She first appeared in the comedy film After Five in the Forest Primeval (1995), for which she won a Bavarian Film Award for Best Young Actress. Her breakthrough came in 1998, when she starred in the acclaimed action thriller Run Lola Run, for which she won a BAMBI Award for Best Actress. She received further critical acclaim and a Bavarian Television Award nomination for her performance in the television film Opernball (also 1998).

After half a decade of well-received roles in German productions, Potente made the transition into Hollywood with her role in the biographical crime film Blow (2001), and achieved wider recognition for her appearances in The Bourne Identity (2002) and The Bourne Supremacy (2004). She portrayed communist revolutionary Tamara Bunke in Che (2008), and psychologist Anita Gregory in The Conjuring 2 (2016). Her other notable films include Anatomy (2000), The Princess and the Warrior (2000), Creep (2004), Romulus, My Father (2007), Eichmann (2007), and Muse (2017).

Potente has starred in the television series Copper (2012–2013), Taboo (2017), Claws, Titans and Echo 3. She played recurring roles in the second seasons of American Horror Story (2012) and The Bridge (2014). She appeared prominently in season 4 of the police drama Dark Winds (2026), an AMC adaptation of the novels of Tony Hillerman.

== Early life ==
The elder of two children, Potente was born in Münster, West Germany, and raised in nearby Dülmen. Her mother, Hildegard, is a medical assistant, and her father, Dieter Potente, is a teacher. Her Italian surname stems from her great-grandfather, a slater from Sicily who migrated to Germany during the 19th century. When she was 17 years old, Potente spent a few months as an exchange student in Humble, a suburb of Houston, Texas.

== Career ==
=== 1990s ===
After finishing high school in Germany, Potente enrolled at the Otto Falckenberg School of Performing Arts in Munich. Potente took acting jobs outside school time and appeared in her first movie in the 1995 student film Aufbruch (Departure). She was then spotted by a casting agent and appeared in the film Nach Fünf im Urwald (After Five in the Forest Primeval), directed by her then-boyfriend, Hans Christian Schmid. She played the role of a 17-year-old girl named Anna who, in search of freedom in an urban environment, runs away from home with a boy who has a crush on her. The film premiered at the 1995 Hof International Film Festival and opened in German theaters on 25 April 1996. She received the 1996 Bavarian Film Award for Young Talent for her work in this film. She subsequently finished her last year of training at the Lee Strasberg Theatre Institute in Manhattan.

Potente returned to Europe and worked in German and French films; her breakthrough came with 1998's Lola rennt (Run Lola Run) after meeting the director, Tom Tykwer, in a café. Specifically written for her persona, her role was that of a woman who needs to obtain 100,000 Deutsche Mark in twenty minutes to save her boyfriend's life. Budgeted at US$1 million, the arthouse thriller was a critical and commercial success, grossing US$14.5 million worldwide. Variety wrote that her performance was "heroic, fierce, frightened and vulnerable all at once", while eFilmCritic.com called her casting a "smart choice". Following her newfound success, she starred opposite Teemu Aromaa in Downhill City (1999), a small-scale drama directed by Finnish director Hannu Salonen, and in the romantic comedy Bin ich schön?, about people having trouble with love and identity, which was released on 17 September 1999 in Germany.

=== 2000s ===
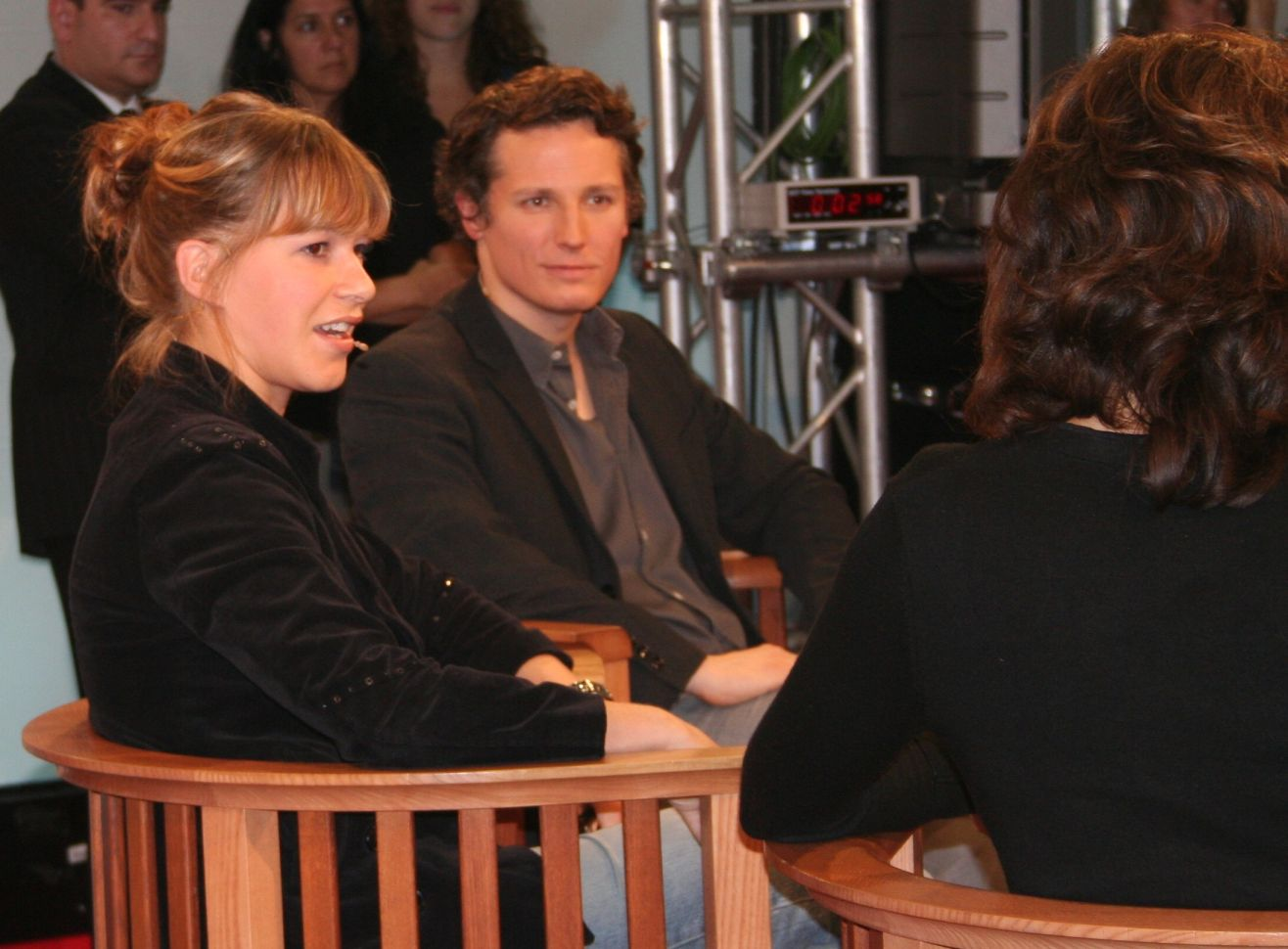
Potente (left) at the 2005 Frankfurt Book Fair

In the German-language horror film Anatomy (2000), she starred as a medical student who wins a place at an exclusive Heidelberg medical school, where she uncovers a gruesome conspiracy by a secret Anti-Hippocratic society. The film was a box office success in Germany, grossing US$10.5 million domestically, and Variety, in its review for the film, remarked: "Boasting a gutsy performance from sturdy young German star Franka Potente (Run Lola Run), Anatomy is creepy, sometimes gruesome, widescreen fun that pushes all the right buttons. Out-performing Scream at the local [box office] and the biggest German pic of the year so far, this is natural latenight/fantasy fest fare that could become a cult item on half-inch and possibly even theatrically". Also in 2000, she had the starring role in the romantic drama The Princess and the Warrior, directed by Tykwer, her Run Lola Run director. In the film, she portrayed a psychiatric hospital nurse who, after a near-death experience, enters into a relationship with an anguished former soldier (Benno Fürmann, also her co-star in Anatomy) who lapses into criminality. The independent film was favorably received by critics; eFilmCritic stated that Potente "proves her versatility as an actress here with a much more subdued character, but is still capable of delivering powerhouse emotional scenes", while the consensus of review-aggregator website Rotten Tomatoes was: "More slow-moving than Run Lola Run, this film nonetheless offers an intriguing storyline about love and fate". She received nominations for the European Film Award and the German Film Award for Best Actress.

Potente's first English-language role was that of a flight attendant who becomes engaged to cocaine smuggler George Jung in the biographical crime film Blow, alongside Johnny Depp. The film received mixed reviews, while it grossed US$83.2 million worldwide. She played a film editor in the controversial independent drama Storytelling (2001), with Leo Fitzpatrick and Selma Blair. It premiered at the 2001 Cannes Film Festival, and received a limited release in most international markets. Potente next found a much wider recognition from audiences for her performance in The Bourne Identity (2002), co-starring Matt Damon. In the film, she played a European woman who grows closer to the title character, a man suffering from extreme memory loss and attempting to discover his true identity amidst a clandestine conspiracy within the Central Intelligence Agency. A positive critical reception greeted the film upon its release, and budgeted at US$60 million, it grossed US$214 million globally. After her role in the film, she starred in the American films All I Want (2002) and I Love Your Work (2003), and in the German production Blueprint (2003).

She reprised past roles with the German horror sequel Anatomy 2 (2003) and The Bourne Supremacy (2004), the latter which grossed US$288.5 million worldwide. In 2004, she starred in the British-German horror film Creep, as a woman locked in the London Underground overnight who finds herself being stalked by a hideously deformed killer living in the sewers below. Despite mixed reviews, the film grossed US$3.2 million in UK cinemas. ViewLondon wrote: "The performances are good, particularly Potente, who avoids scream queen clichés by making her character surprisingly unlikeable – Kate is rude and arrogant in her early scenes and the fact that she's German is, of course, a coincidence."

In 2006, Potente appeared in the German coming-of-age drama Elementarteilchen (Atomised), based on the novel Les Particules élémentaires by Michel Houellebecq and directed by Oskar Roehler. She wrote and directed Der die Tollkirsche ausgräbt, a silent also released in 2006. She next starred with Eric Bana and Kodi Smit-McPhee in the Australian drama film Romulus, My Father (2007), about the struggle of a couple to raise their son amid great adversity. For her portrayal, she was nominated for an Australian Film Industry Award for Best Lead Actress. Starting in May 2007, Potente had a three-episode recurring arc in the FX drama The Shield, where she played Diro Kesakhian, "the ruthless godmother of L.A.'s Armenian mafia". Also in 2007, she appeared in Eichmann (2007), a biographical film detailing the interrogation of Adolf Eichmann.

In Che (2008), a two-part biopic about Argentine Marxist revolutionary Ernesto "Che" Guevara, Potente took on the role of communist revolutionary Tamara Bunke. She described the film as "really epic and [...] very emotional", during an interview with Vulture magazine. The film, first screened at the Cannes Film Festival, garnered a positive critical response while it made US$40.9 million worldwide. The New Yorker, pointing out Potente, remarked that "[m]ajor figures come and go, diverting the plot without registering much of an impact", and The Hollywood Reporter described her part as a "small role" and felt that the actress "seems utterly uncomfortable in every scene". In 2009, she appeared in the House television series two-part episode "Broken".

=== 2010s ===
Potente filmed the American neo-noir film Shanghai in Bangkok, Thailand, with production wrapping in August 2008. The film, set in the 1940s Chinese spy world, was released on 9 June 2010 in China, and on 2 October 2015 in North America. In 2010, she guest-starred as a spy on-the-run in one episode of the USA Network detective comedy Psych. In 2011, she played the leading role of a passenger in the drama The Sinking of the Laconia, about the Laconia incident. The two-part television film first aired in January 2011 on BBC Two.

Potente starred in BBC America's first original scripted series, Copper, as Eva Heissen, a shrewd German-American businesswoman and the madam of a brothel in the Five Points district of New York City during the American Civil War. The show premiered on 9 August 2012 and had the largest debut in the network's history. It was subsequently renewed for a second season, but the BBC announced its cancellation following its finale. Potente subsequently had a two-episode appearance in American Horror Story: Asylum, as a woman who claims to be Holocaust victim and diarist Anne Frank.

In 2014, Potente landed a role on the second season of the FX series The Bridge as Eleanor Nacht, a "fixer" for the cartel. She returned to the big screen in the horror sequel The Conjuring 2 as real-life German-British parapsychologist Anita Gregory, who investigated the Enfield Poltergeist case in the late 20th century. The Hollywood Reporter found her to be "curiously sidelined for much of the action", but with a worldwide gross of US$320.3 million, it emerged as Potente's most widely seen film. Also in 2016, she obtained the two-episode role of a "calculated and determined" Chief Inspector in the second season of the Canadian supernatural series Dark Matter, and in 2017, she was cast in a supporting role in the BBC period drama series Taboo, alongside Tom Hardy.

=== 2020s ===
In 2020, she wrote and directed her first feature film Home. The film premiered in October 2020.

In 2022, Potente appeared in season four of Titans where she portrayed Mother Mayhem.

=== Authored works ===
Based on Potente's correspondence with colleague Max Urlacher during his time in Los Angeles, a book entitled Los Angeles – Berlin was published in September 2005. In May 2009, Potente published her second book Kick Ass – An Alternative Workout, co-written with her personal trainer Karsten Schellenberg. In August 2010, her first volume of stories "Zehn" was published.

== Personal life ==
After relationships with German film director Tom Tykwer and American actor Elijah Wood, Potente married American actor Derek Richardson in mid 2012, in a private ceremony. The couple lives in Los Angeles, and have two daughters, born in 2011 and 2013.

== Filmography ==
=== Film ===
Year	Title	Role	Notes
1995	After Five in the Forest Primeval	Anna	German: Nach Fünf im Urwald
1998	Run Lola Run	Lola	German: Lola rennt
1998	Am I Beautiful?	Linda	German: Bin ich schön?
1999	Paradise Mall	Mona Wendt	German: Schlaraffenland
1999	Downhill City	Peggy	
2000	Anatomy	Paula Henning	German: Anatomie
2000	The Princess and the Warrior	Simone "Sissi" Schmidt	German: Der Krieger und die Kaiserin
2001	Blow	Barbara Buckley	
2001	Storytelling	Toby's Editor	Segment: "Non-Fiction"
2002	The Bourne Identity	Marie Kreutz	
2002	All I Want	Jane	
2003	I Love Your Work	Mia Lang	
2003	Blueprint	Iris Sellin / Siri Sellin	
2003	Anatomy 2	Paula Henning	German: Anatomie 2
2004	The Bourne Supremacy	Marie Kreutz	
2004	Creep	Kate	
2005	A Life in Suitcases	Trixie Boudain	
2006	Atomised	Annabelle	German: Elementarteilchen
2007	Romulus, My Father	Christine Gaita	
2007	Eichmann	Vera Less	
2008	Che	Tamara "Tania" Bunke	
2010	Shanghai	Leni Müller	
2010	Small Lights	Valerie	German: Valerie
2016	The Conjuring 2	Anita Gregory	
2017	Muse	Susan	
2018	Between Worlds	Julie	
2018	25 km/h	Ute	
2019	Princess Emmy	Queen Karla	Voice
TBA	Liminal †	TBA	Filming

=== Television ===
Year	Title	Role	Notes
1997	Coming In	Nina	Television film
1998	Opernball	Gabrielle Becker	Television film
2007	The Shield	Diro Kesakhian	3 episodes
2008	Manhunt	Beate Klarsfeld	Television film
2008	The Bridge	Elfie Bauer	Television film
2009	House	Lydia Bohm	2 episodes - season 6 - ep 1&2
2010	Psych	Nadia	Episode: "One, Maybe Two, Ways Out"
2011	The Sinking of the Laconia	Hilda Smith	2 episodes
2011	Beate Uhse	Beate Uhse	Television film
2012	American Horror Story: Asylum	Anne Frank / Charlotte Brown	2 episodes
2012–2013	Copper	Eva Heissen	20 episodes
2014	The Bridge	Eleanor Nacht	12 episodes
2016	Dark Matter	Chief Inspector Shaddick	2 episodes
2016	Der Island-Krimi	Solveig Karlsdóttir	2 episodes
2017	Taboo	Helga von Hinten	7 episodes
2018	Claws	Zlata Ostrovsky	2 seasons
2022	Titans	May Bennett / Mother Mayhem	Regular role (season 4)
2022	Echo 3	Hildy	Hildy prison camp member
2023–2025	Castlevania: Nocturne	Erzsebet Báthory / Sekhmet	Voice role
2026	Dark Winds	Irene Vaggan	Season 4

=== Video games ===
Year	Title	Role	Notes
2008	Robert Ludlum's The Bourne Conspiracy	Marie Helena Kreutz	Voice role

== Discography ==
- Believe (1998)
- Wish (Komm zu mir) (1998)
- Easy Day (1999)
- Fly with Me (2001)

== Bibliography ==
- 2005: Los Angeles – Berlin. Ein Jahr
- 2006: Der die Tollkirsche ausgräbt, Drehbuch zum Film
- 2009: Kick Ass – Das alternative Workout
- 2010: Zehn: Stories
- 2014: Almählich wird es Tag

== Awards and nominations ==
Year	Work	Award	Result
1995	After Five in the Forest Primeval	Bavarian Film Award for Best Young Actress	Won
1998	Run Lola Run	Bambi Award for Best Actress	Won
1998	Opernball	Bavarian TV Award for Best Actress in a Movie Made for Television	Nominated
1998	—N/a	Berlin International Film Festival EFP Shooting Star Award	Won
1999	—N/a	German Film Award for German Actress of the Year	Won
2000	The Princess and the Warrior	European Film Award for Best Actress	Nominated
2000	The Princess and the Warrior	German Film Award for Best Actress in a Leading Role	Nominated
2000	The Princess and the Warrior	Jupiter Award for Best German Actress	Won
2007	Romulus, My Father	Australian Film Institute Award for Best Actress in a Leading Role	Nominated
