= Interictal dysphoric disorder =

Mood disorder with epilepsy

Interictal dysphoric disorder (IDD) is a mood disorder sometimes found in patients with epilepsy, at a prevalence rate of approximately 17%. The most common symptom of IDD is intermittent dysphoric mood in between seizures. Interictal dysphoric disorder can often be treated with a combination of antidepressant and anticonvulsant medication. Its existence as a diagnostic entity is not totally established, and IDD is not included in the DSM-5.

== History ==
Emil Kraepelin in 1923 first outlined a set of symptoms common in people with chronic epilepsy, the most prominent of which is intermittent depressive episodes. These mood changes occur without any external triggers, during the interictal phase (between seizures). In 1949, Bleuler note a similar syndrome and in 1955, Gastaut confirmed both these observations.

Later, Blumer coined the term interictal dysphoric disorder to describe a similar pleomorphic presentation of symptoms exhibited by his patients. Blumer and Altshuler outlined eight affective-somatoform symptoms that characterize IDD: depressive moods, irritability, anergia, insomnia, pains, phobic fears, and euphoric moods. The diagnosis of IDD should be made when at least three of the seven symptoms are present.
