= Josef Haslinger =

Austrian writer (born 1955)

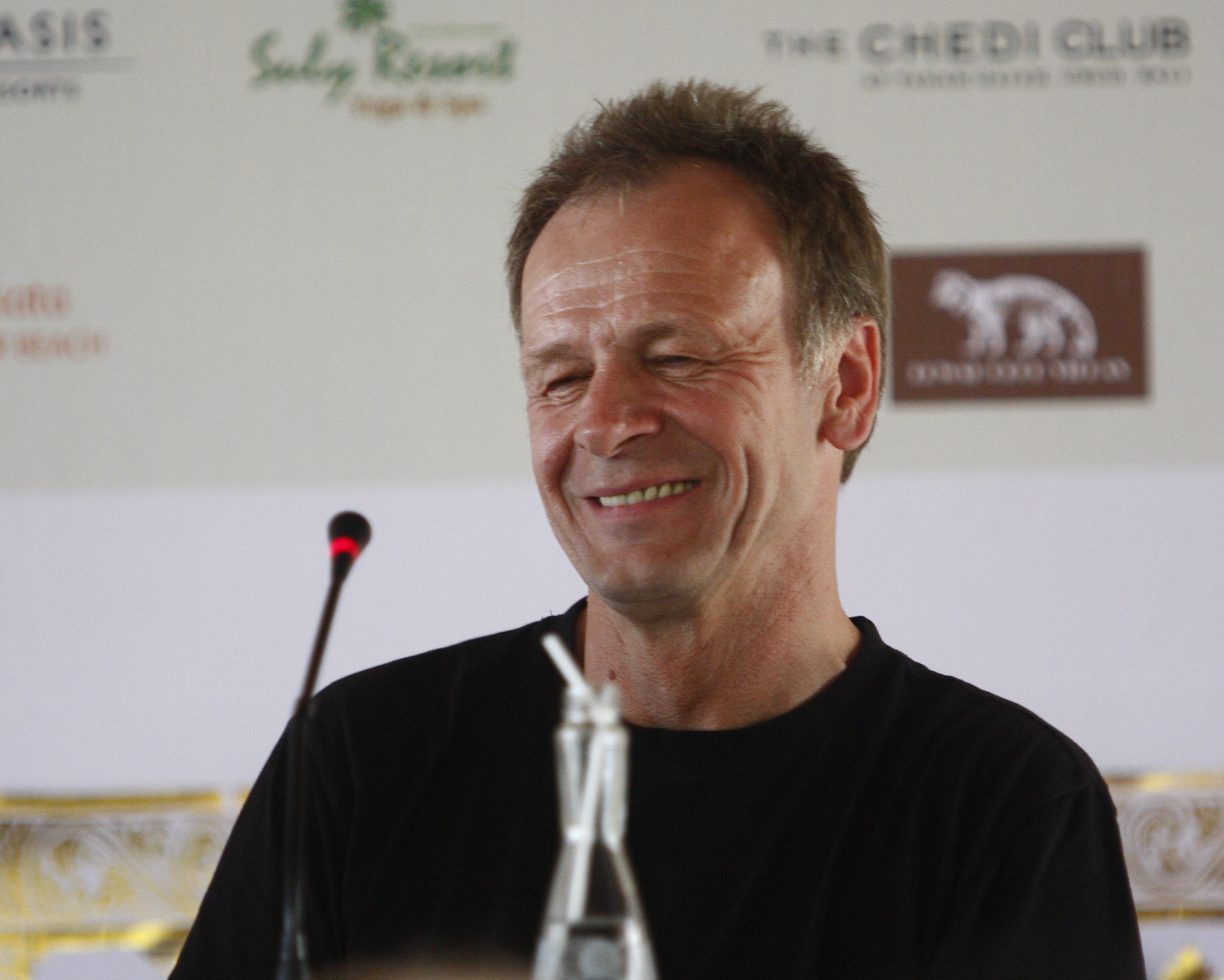
Josef Haslinger on Ubud Writers & Readers Festival 2012

Josef Haslinger (born July 5, 1955) is an Austrian writer.

Haslinger was born in Zwettl, Lower Austria. He studied philosophy, drama and Germanic studies at the University of Vienna. He received his PhD in 1980. Since then he has been working as a freelance writer. 1976 to 1992 he was co-editor of the literary magazine "Wespennest".

In 1983/84 Haslinger had a teaching position at the University of Kassel, was Secretary General of the Graz Authors' Assembly from 1986 to 1989, and from 1986 to 1994 co-organizer of the "Vienna Lectures on Literature". In 1995 he was a lecturer at the University of Kassel and wrote parts of his political thriller novel, Opernball (Opera Ball) there.

Haslinger has taught since 1996 as a professor of literary aesthetics at the German Literature Institute in Leipzig. He lives between Vienna and Leipzig.

== Awards and honors ==
- 1980 Theodor Körner Prize
- 1982 Österreichisches Staatsstipendium für Literatur
- 1984 Förderungspreis der Stadt Wien
- 1985 Stipendium des Deutschen Literaturfonds
- 1988 Österreichisches Dramatikerstipendium
- 1993–94 Elias Canetti-Stipendium der Stadt Wien
- 1994 Stipendium des Deutschen Literaturfonds
- 1994 Förderungspreis des Landes Niederösterreich für Literatur
- 1996 New-York-Stipendium des Deutschen Literaturfonds
- 2000 Literaturpreis der Stadt Wien
- 2000 Ehrenpreis des österreichischen Buchhandels für Toleranz in Denken und Handeln
- 2010 Mainzer Stadtschreiber
- 2011 Rheingau Literatur Preis

== Works ==
=== Prose ===
- Der Konviktskaktus (stories) (1980)
- Der Rauch im Wald (1981)
- Hugo Sonnenschein (1984)
- Der Tod des Kleinhäuslers Ignaz Hajek (short story) (1985)
- Opernball (1995)
- Das Vaterspiel (2000)
- Zugvögel (stories) S. Fischer Verlag ISBN 3-10-030057-2 (2006)
- Phi Phi Island. Ein Bericht. S. Fischer Verlag ISBN 978-3-10-030059-1 (2007)

=== Essays ===
- Die Ästhetik des Novalis (1981)
- Politik der Gefühle – Ein Essay über Österreich (1987). Fischer-Verlag ISBN 3-596-12365-8
- Wozu brauchen wir Atlantis (1990)
- Das Elend Amerikas. 11 Versuche über ein gelobtes Land (1992)
- Hausdurchsuchungen im Elfenbeinturm (1996)
- Klasse Burschen (2001)
- Am Ende der Sprachkultur? Über das Schicksal von Schreiben, Sprechen und Lesen. (Wiener Karl Kraus Vorlesungen zur Kulturkritik, Band 1), ISBN 3-902416-01-7 (2003)

=== Editor ===
- Wie werde ich ein verdammt guter Schriftsteller? Berichte aus der Werkstatt, Hg. zus. mit Hans-Ulrich Treichel. Frankfurt/Main: Suhrkamp, 2005. TB ISBN 978-3-518-12395-9
- Schreiben lernen – Schreiben lehren, Hg. zus. mit Hans-Ulrich Treichel. Frankfurt/Main: Fischer, 2006. TB ISBN 978-3-596-16967-2

== See also ==
- List of Austrian writers
