= List of debutante balls in the United States =

The list of debutante balls in the United States aims to include notable debutante balls held in the United States.

== Alabama ==
- Birmingham:
  - The Ball of Roses
- Mobile
  - The Camellia Ball, held the Wednesday before Thanksgiving.

A souvenir recording released by Verve Records in the summer of 1959 featuring longtime San Francisco bandleader Ernie Heckscher playing for The Cotillion at The Fairmont. The cover photo models are some of the previous winter's debutantes and their escorts

== California ==
- Los Angeles:
  - National Charity League of Los Angeles Coronet Debutante Ball
  - La Canada Thursday Club Debutante Ball
  - Palos Verdes Assembly Presentation Ball
  - Las Madrinas Ball
  - Peninsula Ball -
  - Bal Blanc de Noel - presentation of Les Fleurettes

== District of Columbia ==
- Washington, D.C.:
  - The National Debutante Cotillion and Thanksgiving Ball
  - Washington Assembly Christmas Dance

== Florida ==
- Tampa:
  - Ye Mystic Krewe of Gasparilla Debutante Ball
- Sarasota:
  - The Debutante Program of Sarasota & Manatee Counties
- Clearwater:
  - The Debutante Club of Clearwater
- St. Petersburg:
  - The Debutante Club of St. Petersbugh
- Fort Myers: Edison Pageant of Light Coronation Ball. Since 1938, the Edison Pageant of Light organization and Fort Myers Woman’s Community Club host a Coronation Ball, the Thomas Alva Edison Birthday Party, and an Edison Festival of Light Parade Party. These popular and ever expanding events are a meaningful and fun tradition for members and community alike celebrating Thomas Edison and his contributions to the Fort Myers community as a winter resident. These events take place and experience great success due to the generous efforts of Edison Pageant of Light members, committees, and the Pageant's community supporters. This is in direct correlation to The Edison Festival of Light which takes place for the month February every year. A court is selected of outstanding young men and women from the Fort Myers area every year since 1938. A king and queen is then chosen and crowned King and Queen of Edisonia at the coronation ball.

== Georgia ==
- Athens:
  - Georgia DAR State Conference Debutante Presentation
- Atlanta:
  - Upsilon Alpha Omega Chapter, Alpha Kappa Alpha Debutante Cotillion and Scholarship Ball

== Illinois ==
- Chicago:

Illinois Club for Catholic Women- The Illinois Club for Catholic Women Presentation Ball is an annual, invitation-only debutante presentation in Chicago, Illinois. Long associated with established Catholic families, it is regarded as one of the city’s most traditional social events. Held in the historic Grand Ballroom of the Conrad Hilton Hotel around Christmas time every year.

Founded in the early twentieth century, the Ball includes the formal presentation of debutantes to the Cardinal of the Archdiocese of Chicago, reflecting the ICCW’s emphasis on faith, service, and the formation of young women within the Catholic community.

Legion of Young Polish Women White & Red Ball

== Indiana ==
- Indianapolis:
  - Presentation of Daughters, Held since 1950 during the holiday season, the Presentation is a biennial ball of The Dramatic Club of Indianapolis (founded 1889).

== Kentucky ==
- Lexington:
  - The Bluegrass Charity Ball

== Louisiana ==
To be considered a Debutante in *New Orleans, a young woman must be presented at a party by her family and/or their friends, and at one or more of the following Clubs:

  - Le Debut des Jeunes Filles de la Nouvelle Orleans
  - The Bachelor's Club
  - The Pickwick Club
  - The Debutante Club
  - The Mid-Winter Cotillion
  - The Original Illinois Club
  - The Young Men Illinois Club

New Orleans Debutantes may also be invited to be presented in one or more Carnival organizations' balls, along with other young ladies who may not be making a formal debut, although the organizations generally prefer that the ladies they present are formally debuting):

  - Mistick Krewe of Comus, Founded in 1856(or 7)
  - The Twelfth Night Revelers (TNR), founded in 1870
  - Knights of Momus, founded in 1872
  - Rex, founded in 1872
  - Krewe of Proteus, founded in 1882
  - The Atlanteans, founded in 1891
  - Elves of Oberon, founded in 1895
  - Krewe of Nereus, founded in 1895
  - The High Priests of Mithras, founded in 1897
  - Krewe of Athenians, founded 1909
  - Krewe of Mystery, founded in 1912
  - Mystic, founded in 1923
  - Prophets of Persia, founded 1927
  - The Grand Ball of Osiris, founded in 1934
  - Dorians, founded in 1937
  - Caliphs of Cairo, founded 1937
  - Krewe of Achaeans, founded in 1947

And/or in other organizations' presentations, like:

  - Society of the War of 1812 in Louisiana

In Lafeyette, debutantes are presented at the DAR/SAR George Washington Debutante Ball

== Maryland ==
- Washington D.C.:
  - Gridiron Club Dinner
  - United States presidential inaugural balls
  - Russian Ball, Washington, D.C.
  - Assembly Club of Hagerstown, MD

== Massachusetts ==
- Boston:
  - The Boston Cotillion, which benefits the Vincent Memorial Hospital.

== Missouri ==
- Kansas City:
  - The Jewel Ball, founded in 1954, which benefits the Nelson-Atkins Museum of Art and the Kansas City Symphony.
- St. Louis:
  - The Veiled Prophet Ball, founded in 1878, which caters to the members of the Veiled Prophet Organization, a secret society of prominent St. Louisans
  - Fleur de Lis Ball, a Roman Catholic ball founded in 1959, named after the symbol associated with French kings and the city's French heritage, which raises money for the Cardinal Glennon Children's Hospital.
- Springfield:
  - The Heather Court Ball, associated with Highland Springs Country Club. All presentees are the daughters or granddaughters of Members and are of at least 16 years of age.
  - The Snowflake Ball, associated with Hickory Hill Country Club. All presentees are the daughters and granddaughters of Members.
  - Rose Ball, Twin Oaks debutante ball that presents members’ daughters and granddaughters, sixteen years of age or Sophomores or Juniors in High School, to the membership. The presentation highlights her accomplishments and a celebratory ball concludes the evening. This tradition began at Twin Oaks in 1963. https://twinoakscountryclub.com/rose-ball

== Nebraska ==
- Omaha:
  - Omaha Symphony Debutante Ball was established in 1966 as an annual fund-raising event traditionally held on December 27.

== New York ==
- New York City:
  - Alfred E. Smith Memorial Foundation Dinner
  - The International Debutante Ball, held each even-numbered year
  - The Viennese Opera Ball in New York

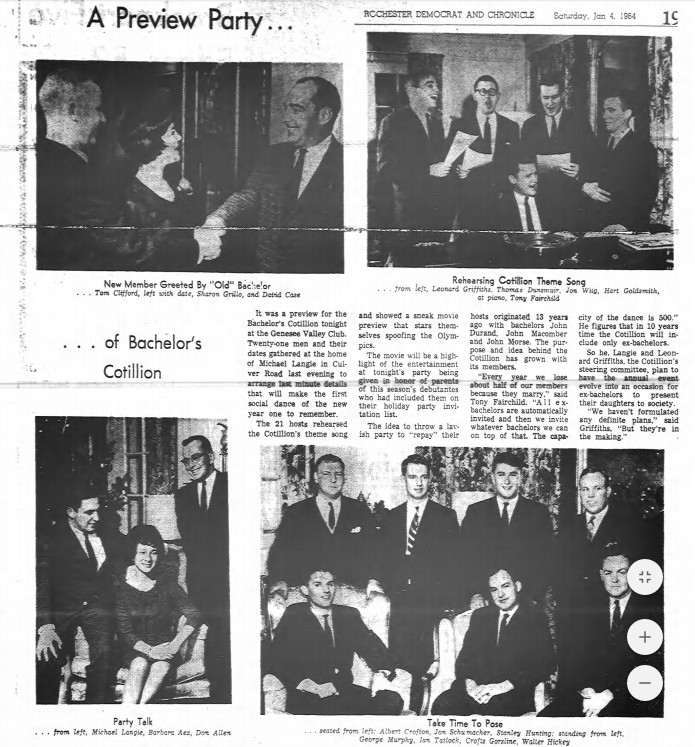
The Rochester Bachelors' Cotillion in 1964.

- Rochester:
  - The Rochester Bachelors' Cotillion was founded in 1950 by a group of single young men from some of Rochester's social circles that wished to repay their social debt. It is a white tie ball held annually at the Genesee Valley Club.

== North Carolina ==
- Asheville:
  - Coronation Ball of the Rhododendron Royal Brigade of Guards
- Cary:
  - The Cary Debutante Society Ball
- Charlotte:
  - The Charlotte Guild Debutante Club
- Durham:
  - Debutante Cotillion and Christmas Ball of Durham
- Gastonia:
  - Gastonia Debutante Ball
- Greensboro:
  - The Greensboro Symphony Presentation Ball
- Greenville:
  - Carolinian Debutante Ball
- High Point:
  - High Point Debutante Club Annual Presentation and Ball
- Raleigh:
  - Alpha Theta Omega Chapter of Alpha Kappa Alpha Debutante Ball
  - The Terpsichorean Society Debutante Ball
- Shelby:
  - Junior Charity League of Shelby Debutante Ball
- Wilmington:
  - North Carolina Azalea Festival
- Winston-Salem:
  - Winston-Salem Debutante Committee Presentation and Ball

== Ohio ==
- Cleveland:
  - The Assembly Ball, presented by The Recreation League of Cleveland annually since 1937 at The Union Club.

CINCINNATI - The Bachelors Cotillion, held annually since 1925

== Pennsylvania ==
- Pittsburgh:
  - Cinderella Ball, founded in 1924.
- Philadelphia:
  - The Philadelphia Charity Ball, founded in 1881.
- Valley Forge:
  - The Daughters of the American Revolution Constitution Debutante Ball

== South Carolina ==
- Charleston:
  - The St. Cecilia Ball
- Lexington
  - The Lexington Cotillion Holiday Ball

== Texas ==
- Laredo:
  - The Society of Martha Washington Debutante Ball
- Tyler:
  - The Texas Rose Festival
- Dallas:
  - The Idlewild Club
- Austin:
  - The Crystal Ball
  - The Jewel Ball
  - The Coronation Ball by the Admiral's Club of Austin
  - The Debutante Presentation Ball by the Bachelor's of Austin.
- San Antonio:
  - The Charity Ball
- Fort Worth:
  - Steeplechase Ball
- Waxahachie:
  - Symphony Belles and Beaus

== Virginia ==
- Chantilly:
  - The Old Dominion Cotillion
- Ettrick:
  - Wives of Beaux-Twenty Debutante Cotillion
- Richmond:
  - Bal du Bois
  - The Richmond German Christmas Dance
  - Virginia DAR State Conference Debutante Presentation

== Washington ==
- Tacoma:
  - Tacoma Holiday Cotillion
