= Fleur de Lis Ball =

Formal cotillion/debutante ball in St. Louis, USA

The Fleur de Lis Ball is a formal cotillion ball in St. Louis, Missouri, for adolescents of affluent society around the Roman Catholic Archdiocese of St. Louis, started in 1958 by a group of Catholic upper-class women. It teaches etiquette and ballroom skills to young debutante women and men. Four years of classes end with the Fleur de Lis Ball itself, which benefits Cardinal Glennon Children's Hospital. Female guests wear white debutante gowns with gloves, and are escorted and presented to the Archbishop of St. Louis. It is one of two major cotillion balls in Saint Louis.

== See also ==
- Veiled Prophet Ball - St. Louis's other debutante cotillion
- Jewel Ball - another debutante cotillion in Missouri
