= Las Madrinas Ball =

American debutante ball in California

Las Madrinas Ball is a debutante ball held in Los Angeles, California by Las Madrinas (Spanish, the Godmothers), a nonprofit organization founded in 1933 to provide financial support to Children's Hospital Los Angeles and its medical research programs. The Las Madrinas Ball has been described as "the oldest and most prestigious" debutante ball in the Los Angeles area and as "the most impressive debutante ball in Southern California". It is held in December each year and is the traditional starting event of the Los Angeles social season.

The sponsoring organization, Las Madrinas, was founded on October 11, 1933 with 65 founding members including descendants of Californio land-grant families and local wealthy families, mostly from areas like Pasadena and Hancock Park. The organization's mission was to raise funds for what was then called the Convalescent Home of the Children's Hospital by putting on an annual charity ball. Las Madrinas held its first charity ball two months later, on December 15, 1933, at the Biltmore Hotel. In 1939 the format was transformed into a debutante ball. The ball was suspended during World War II and resumed in 1945. Historically the debutantes in the Las Madrinas Ball were required to come from families of "money and breeding and social position.”

For the first 25 years press photography was banned; the ban was lifted in 1958 to permit Life Magazine to cover the event.

== See also ==
- List of debutante balls in the United States#California
