= Frank A. De Puy =

- Born: 1854; Lima, NY
- Died: 1927 (aged 72–73); Bronx, NY
- Occupations: journalist, editor
- Spouse: Adeiaide Gillette De Puy
- Children: 2

Frank A. De Puy (1854-1927) was a journalist and editor for the New York Times between 1877 through 1927. He was originally a Washington, DC correspondent, original member of the Gridiron Club and firm friend of Grover Cleveland. After the Panic of 1893, he joined The Times, The New York Herald, and The Tribune until returning to the New York Times.

During his career he published the book, The New Century Home Book, which was to act as a compendium for the home at the turn of the century. The book contains a wide variety of household tips and historical facts of that time. While technically out of print, this book enjoyed considerable popularity and thus can still be found in flea markets, older libraries, and sometimes on used books websites. Wentworth Press supposedly picked up the book and republished it, but Wentworth is an Australian publisher that is out of business.

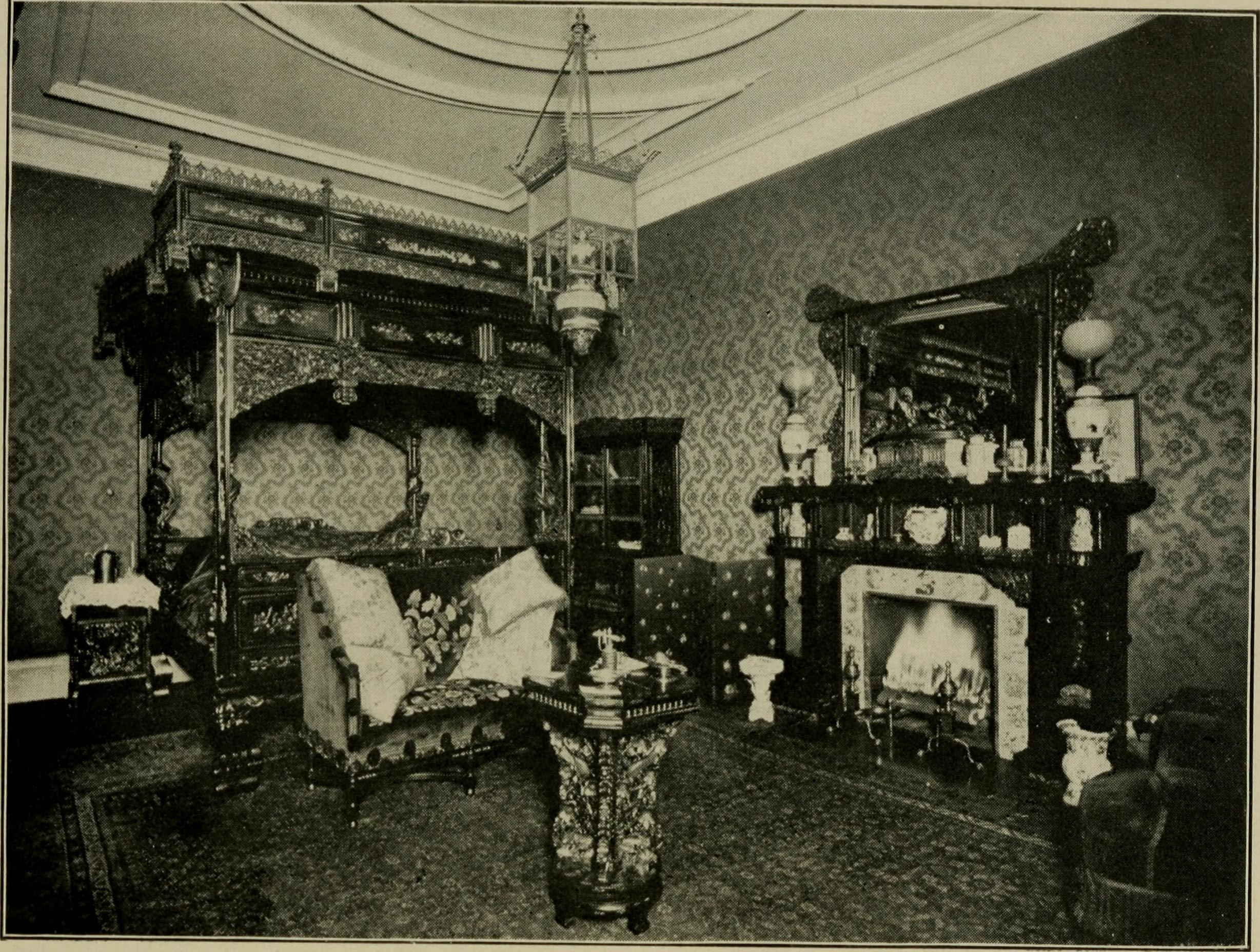
Picture from the Book- Bedroom in Haveymeyer Mansion, NY.

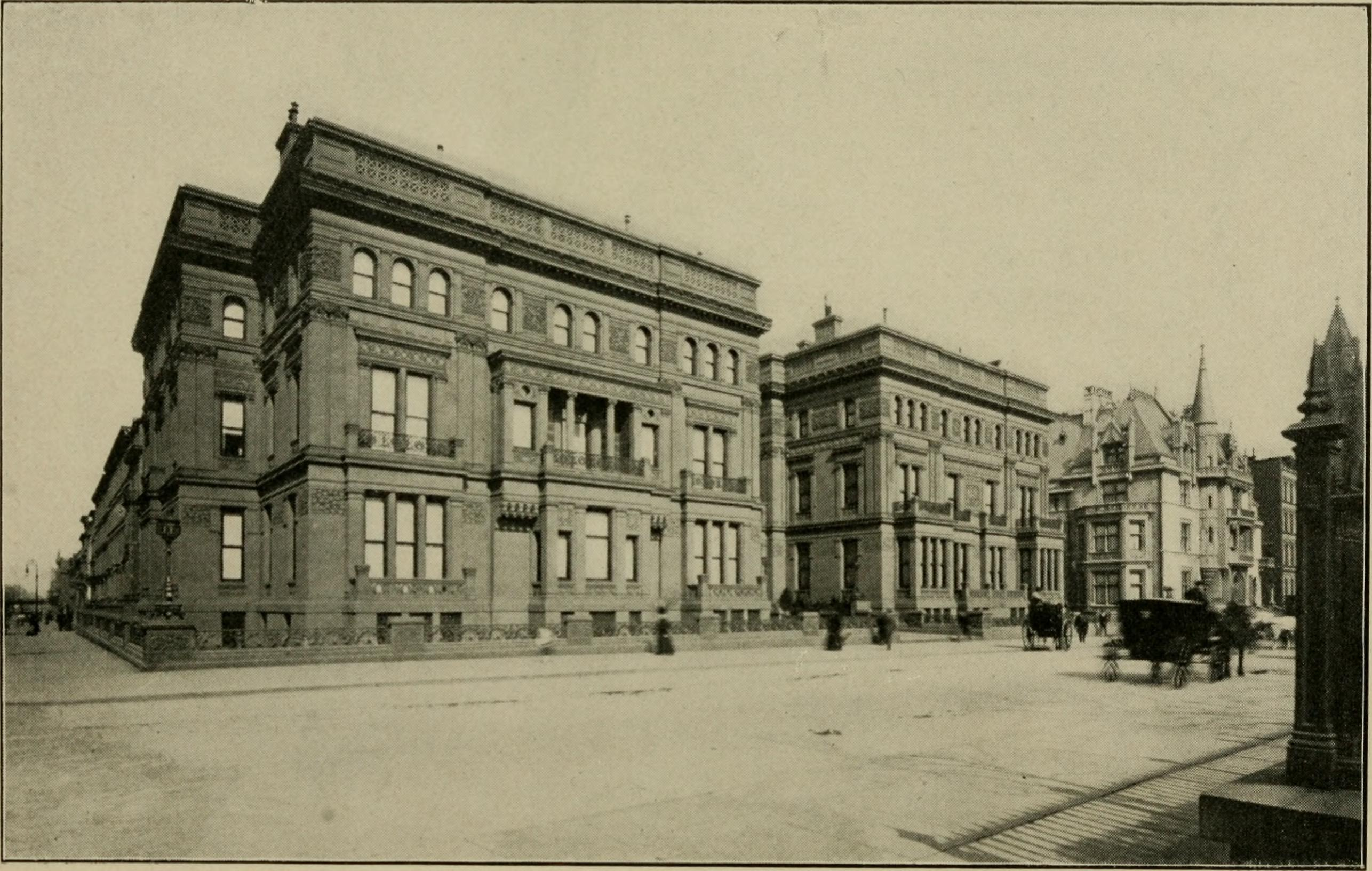
Picture from the Book- Vanderbilt Residences, Fifth Ave., NY

== Sources ==
- "Frank A De Puy Books - Biography and List of Works - Author of 'The New Century Home Book'". www.biblio.com.
- "F. A. DE PUY DIES, LONG TIME EDITOR; Member of The Times Staff Served Half a Century on New York Newspapers. A GRIDIRON CLUB FOUNDER Began His Work in Journalism While Still a Union Undergraduate". The New York Times. 1927-04-06. ISSN 0362-4331.
- Puy, Frank A. De (2016-08-28). NEW CENTURY HOME BK A MENTOR F. WENTWORTH Press. ISBN 9781371995836.
- Senate, United States. Congress (1901). Journal of the Executive Proceedings of the Senate of the United States.
- N.Y.), Union University (Schenectady (1897). A record of the commemoration, June twenty-first to twenty-seventy, 1895, of the one hundredth anniversary of the founding of Union College, including a sketch of its history.
- Light, Anthony Francis (2009). Keeping their places: Emulation, simplicity, and class distinction in the domestic imagination 1877–1925 (Thesis). ProQuest 305039946.
- Austlit. "The Wentworth Press: (author/organisation) | AustLit: Discover Australian Stories". www.austlit.edu.au.
