= Alfred E. Smith Memorial Foundation Dinner =

Annual white-tie dinner held in New York City since 1945

- Date: Third Thursday of October
- Frequency: Annually
- Locations: Waldorf Astoria New York; Manhattan, New York City, New York, United States
- Founded: 1945
- Leader: Archbishop of New York
- Organizer: Alfred E. Smith Memorial Foundation
- Website: AlSmithFoundation.org/the-dinner

The Alfred E. Smith Memorial Foundation Dinner, commonly known as the Al Smith Dinner, is an annual white tie dinner in New York City to raise funds for Catholic charities supporting children of various needs in the Archdiocese of New York. Held at New York City's Waldorf-Astoria Hotel on the third Thursday of October, it is hosted by the Archbishop of New York. It is organized by the Alfred E. Smith Memorial Foundation in honor of Al Smith, who grew up in poverty and was later elected governor of New York four times and was the first Catholic nominated for president by a major party as the Democratic nominee in the 1928 election.

Cardinal Francis Spellman founded and hosted the first dinner in 1945 after Smith's death the previous year. By 1960, the Al Smith dinner had become a "ritual of American politics", in the words of Theodore H. White. It is generally the last event at which the two major party presidential candidates share a stage before the election. Apart from presidential candidates, keynote speakers have included Tony Blair, Tom Brokaw, Bob Hope, Henry Kissinger, Clare Boothe Luce, and many other prominent civic, business, and church leaders.

== History ==
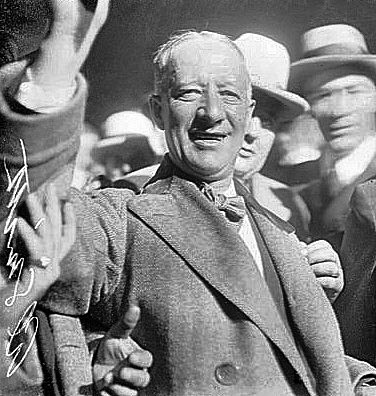
Alfred E. Smith in 1928.

Since 1960, when John F. Kennedy (who would become the first Roman Catholic president) and Richard Nixon were speakers, it has traditionally been a stop for the two major party presidential candidates during election years. In 1976, Jimmy Carter and Gerald Ford spoke; in 1980, Carter and Ronald Reagan; in 1988, George H. W. Bush and Michael Dukakis; in 2000, Al Gore and George W. Bush; in 2008, Barack Obama and John McCain; in 2012, Barack Obama and Mitt Romney; in 2016, Hillary Clinton and Donald Trump; and in 2020, Trump and Joe Biden. The 1992 dinner was not attended by Bill Clinton or George H. W. Bush because there was a presidential debate that same night. Candidates have traditionally given humorous speeches, poking fun at themselves and their opponents, making the event similar to a roast. The 2018 dinner raised $3.9 million.

Since 1980, this custom has been affected by friction between the Democratic Party and the Catholic Church over abortion. During the 1980 dinner, Democratic incumbent Jimmy Carter was booed. In 1984, Ronald Reagan spoke, but his opponent, Walter Mondale, opted out, saying he needed time to prepare for an upcoming presidential debate. Amy Sullivan suggests that Mondale's decision was motivated by "tensions between the Catholic Church and the Democratic Party."

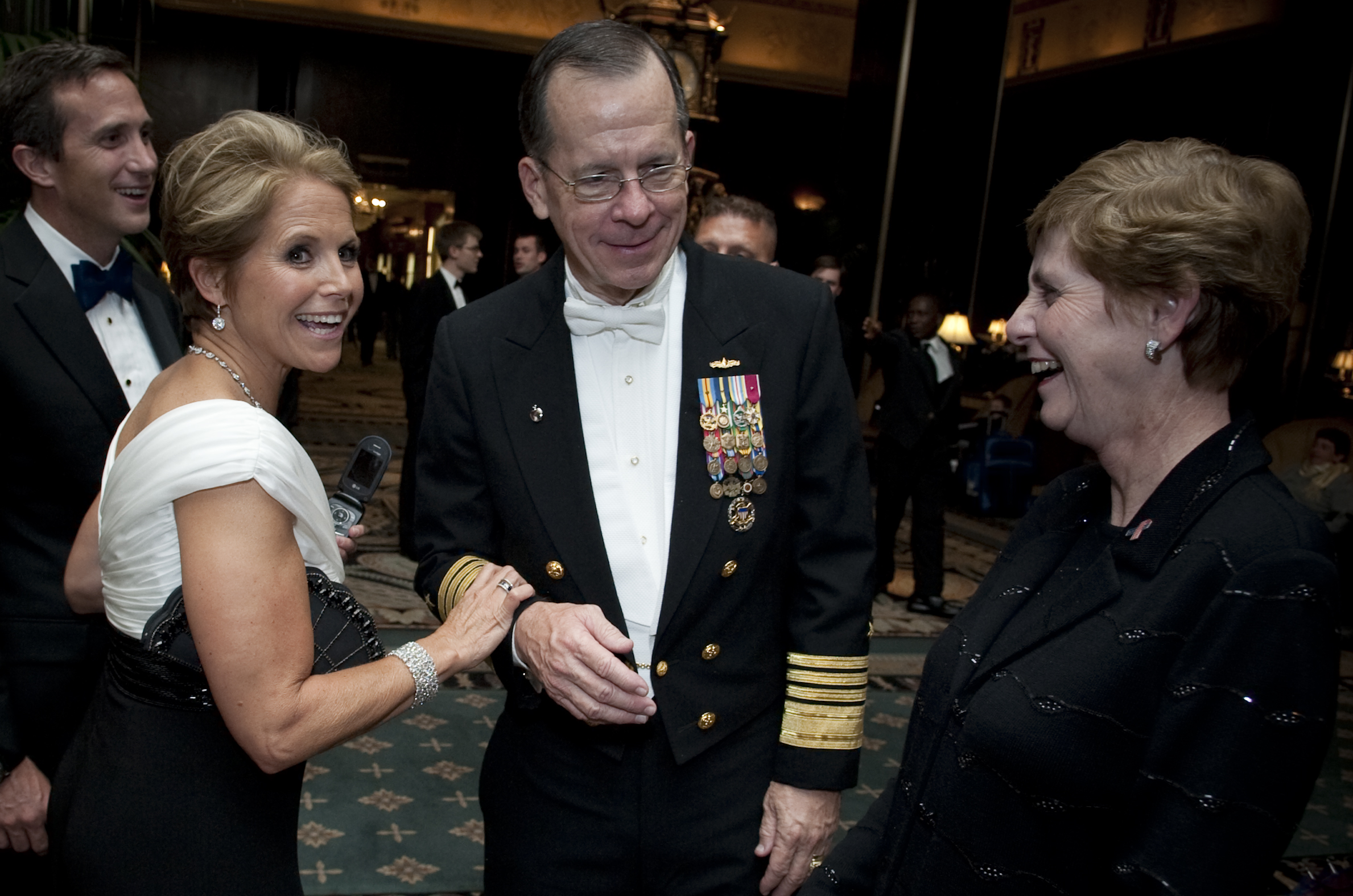
Admiral Michael Mullen with his wife and Katie Couric at the 2009 dinner.

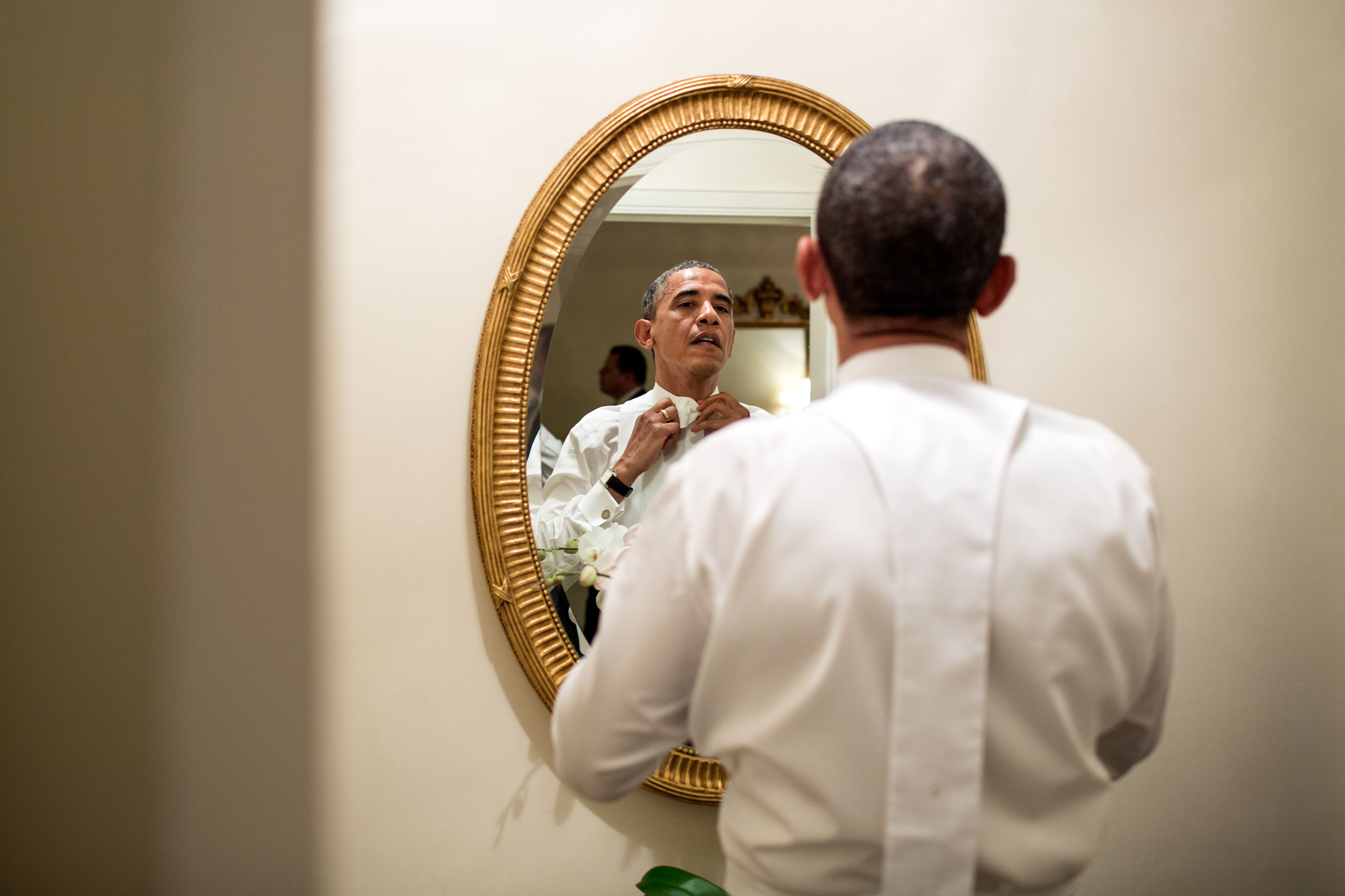
President Barack Obama preparing for the 2012 dinner.

During the 2000 dinner, George W. Bush joked, "This is an impressive crowd. The haves and the have-mores. Some people call you the elite. I call you my base." The quote was used in Fahrenheit 9/11 and subsequently in one of John Kerry's 2004 campaign speeches.

In 1996 and 2004, the Archdiocese of New York chose not to invite the presidential candidates. In 1996, this was reportedly because Cardinal John Joseph O'Connor was angry at Democratic nominee Bill Clinton for vetoing a bill outlawing some late-term abortions. The organizers' explanation was that the candidates had been unable to commit to attending the dinner. The vice presidential candidates, Al Gore and Jack Kemp, spoke instead. In 2004, Archdiocese spokesman Joseph Zwilling explained that the candidates were not invited because "the issues in this year's campaign could provoke division and disagreement," but some speculated that the decision was due to Democratic nominee (and Roman Catholic) John Kerry's pro-choice stance on abortion.

On October 20, 2016, Hillary Clinton and Donald Trump spoke at the dinner which was hosted by Cardinal Timothy M. Dolan, who was seated between the two presidential candidates during the event. During the dinner, Trump made numerous "off-color" remarks about Hillary Clinton, including references to the hacking of the email server of the Democratic National Committee, unsupported allegations of corruption, and a claim that Clinton "hates Catholics". His remarks drew boos and heckling from guests, prompting veteran GOP operative Ed Rollins to comment: "he didn’t quite understand the audience". The 2016 dinner drew 10.3 million viewers and raised a record-breaking $6 million for Catholic charities.

The 2020 dinner occurred in a virtual format, due to the COVID-19 pandemic in New York City, and the traditional roast-like nature was abandoned. Trump and Joe Biden attended virtually; both men discussed Catholicism.

Kamala Harris did not attend the 2024 dinner and instead sent a pre-recorded message to play during the event. She was the first major-party presidential candidate to skip the dinner since Walter Mondale in 1984. Donald Trump, who attended the dinner, called Harris' decision not to attend "deeply disrespectful", while Archbishop of New York Cardinal Timothy M. Dolan expressed his disappointment and pointed out that Mondale lost 49 states.

=== List of U.S. presidential nominees who attended the dinner ===
Election	Democratic nominee	Republican nominee
1960	John F. Kennedy	Richard Nixon
1968	Hubert Humphrey	Richard Nixon
1976	Jimmy Carter	Gerald Ford
1980	Jimmy Carter	Ronald Reagan
1984		Ronald Reagan
1988	Michael Dukakis	George H. W. Bush
2000	Al Gore	George W. Bush
2008	Barack Obama	John McCain
2012	Barack Obama	Mitt Romney
2016	Hillary Clinton	Donald Trump
2020 (Note: The dinner was held virtually due to the ongoing COVID-19 pandemic)	Joe Biden	Donald Trump
2024		Donald Trump

== In media ==
The dinner was the subject of an episode of The West Wing titled "The Al Smith Dinner".

== See also ==
- Gridiron Club Dinner
- International Debutante Ball
- United States presidential inaugural balls
- Viennese Opera Ball in New York
- White House Correspondents' Dinner
