= White tie =

Formal evening Western dress code

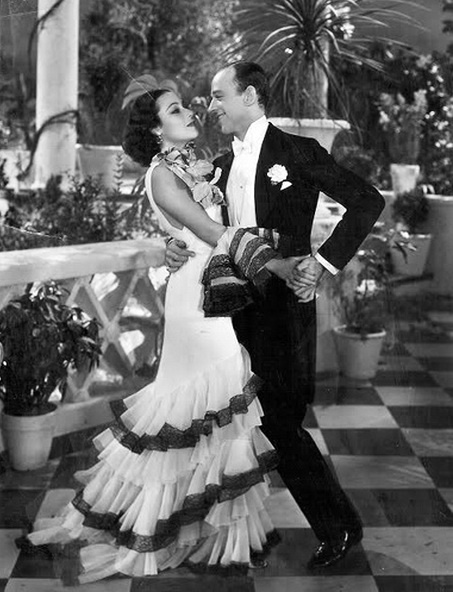
Dolores del Río in ball gown and Fred Astaire in white tie in Flying Down to Rio (1933)

White tie, also called full evening dress or a dress suit, is the most formal evening Western dress code. For men, it consists of a black tail coat (alternatively referred to as a dress coat, usually by tailors) worn over a white dress shirt with a starched or piqué bib, white piqué waistcoat and the white bow tie worn around a standing wing collar. Mid or high-waisted black trousers with galon, a braid of trim consisting of two silk stripes to conceal the outer seams of the trousers, along with court shoes (British English) (pumps in American English) complete the outfit. Orders, decorations and medals in miniature may be worn. Acceptable accessories include a black top hat, white gloves, a white scarf, a pocket watch, a white pocket square, and a boutonnière. Women wear full-length ball or evening gowns with evening gloves and, optionally, tiaras, jewellery, and a small handbag.

The dress code's origins can be traced back to the end of the 18th century. New fully black-coloured justaucorps styles emerged around the Age of Revolution, notably adopted by the bourgeois third estate of the Estates General of the Kingdom of France. Increasingly following the French Revolution, high society men abandoned the richly decorated justaucorps coats for more austere cutaway dress coats in dark colours, with cuts perhaps further inspired by the frocks and riding coats of country gentlemen. Gradually replacing also breeches, lacy dress shirts and jabots with plain white dress shirts, shorter waistcoats, white cravats and pantaloons, this became known as directoire style. By the early 19th-century Regency era, dark dress tailcoats with light trousers became standard daywear, while black and white became the standard colours for evening wear. Although the directoire style was replaced for daytime by black frock coats and bowties by mid-19th century, cutaway black dress tailcoats with white bowtie has remained established for formal evening wear ever since.

Despite the emergence of the more comfortable semi-formal black tie dress code in the 1880s, full evening dress tailcoats remained the staple. Towards the end of the Victorian era, white bow ties and waistcoats became the standard for full evening dress, contrasting with black bow ties and waistcoats or cummerbunds for black tie.

Following the social changes after the First World War and especially with the counterculture of the 1960s, white tie was increasingly replaced by black tie as default evening wear for more formal events. Since the late 20th century, white tie tends to be reserved for the most formal evening occasions, such as at banquets following investitures, state dinners and audiences, in addition to formal balls and galas such as the Vienna Opera Ball in Austria, the Nobel Prize banquet in Stockholm, Mardi Gras balls in New Orleans, Commemoration balls at Oxford and May balls at Cambridge, and the Al Smith Memorial Dinner in New York. White tie still also occurs at traditional weddings and church celebrations, at certain societies and fraternities, as well as occasionally around some traditional European universities and colleges.

== History ==
=== 19th century: origins and development ===
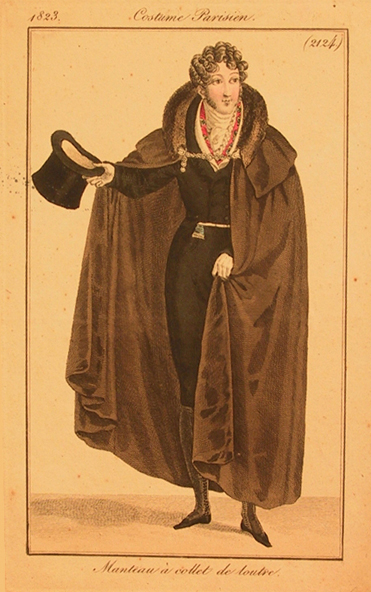
Fashion plate from Costume Parisien (1823)

Throughout the Early Modern period, western European male courtiers and aristocrats donned elaborate clothing at ceremonies and dinners: coats (often richly decorated), frilly and lacy shirts and breeches formed the backbone of their most formal attire. As the 18th century drew to a close, high society began adopting more austere clothing which drew inspiration from the dark hues and simpler designs adopted by country gentlemen. By the end of the 18th century, two forms of tail coat were in common use by upper-class men in Britain and continental Europe: the more formal dress coat (cut away horizontally at the front) and the less formal morning coat, which curved back from the front to the tails. From around 1815, a knee-length garment called the frock coat became increasingly popular and was eventually established, along with the morning coat, as smart daywear in Victorian England. The dress coat, meanwhile, became reserved for wear in the evening. The dandy Beau Brummell adopted a minimalistic approach to evening wear—a white waistcoat, dark blue tailcoat, black pantaloons and striped stockings. Although Brummell felt black an ugly colour for evening dress coats, it was adopted by other dandies, like Charles Baudelaire, and black and white had become the standard colours by the 1840s.

Over the course of the 19th century, the monotone colour scheme became a codified standard for evening events after 6 p.m. in upper class circles. The styles evolved and evening dress consisted of a black dress coat and trousers, white or black waistcoat, and a bow tie by the 1870s. The dinner jacket (black tie/tuxedo) emerged as a less formal and more comfortable alternative to full evening dress in the 1880s.

By the early 20th century, full evening dress meant wearing a white waistcoat and tie with a black tailcoat and trousers; white tie had become distinct from black tie. Despite its growing popularity, the dinner jacket remained the reserve of family dinners and gentlemen's clubs during the late Victorian period.

=== 20th century ===
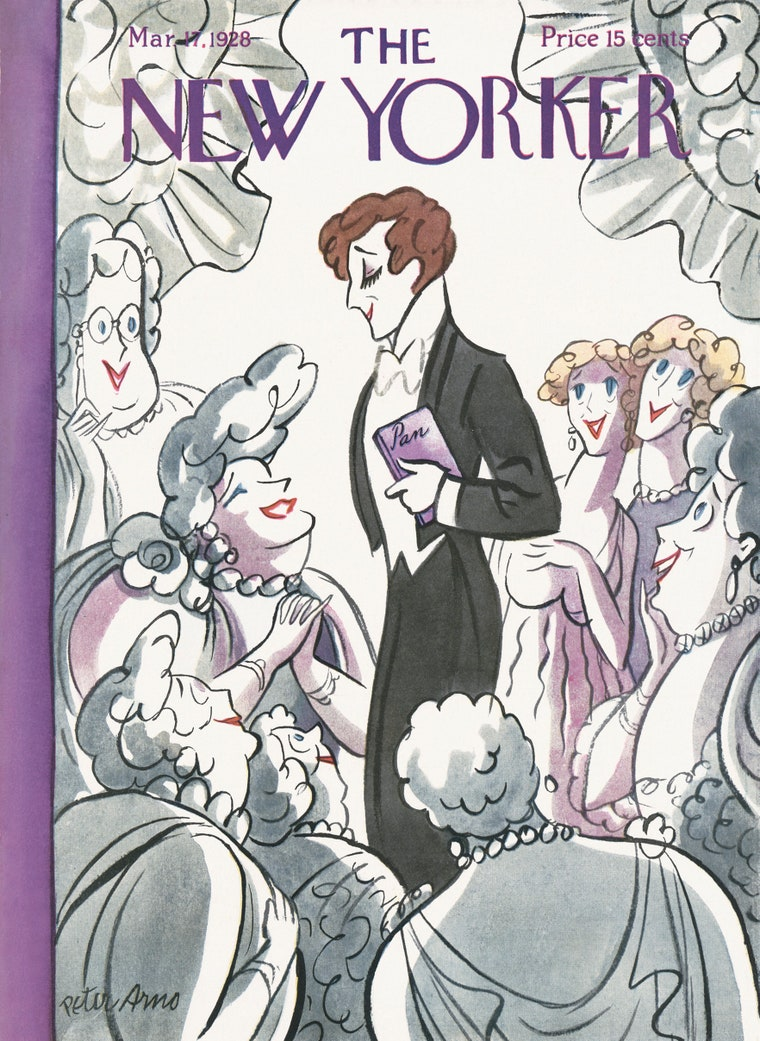
Artistic depiction of a man in white tie dress (The New Yorker, March 17, 1928)

By the turn of the 20th century, full evening dress consisted of a black tailcoat made of heavy fabric weighing 500 to 560 grams per metre (16 to 18 oz/yd). Its lapels were medium width and the white shirt worn beneath it had a heavily starched, stiff front, fastened with pearl or black studs and either a winged collar or a type called a "poke", consisting of a high band with a slight curve at the front. After World War I, the dinner jacket became more popular, especially in the US, and informal variations sprang up, like the soft, turn-down collar shirt and later the double-breasted jacket; relaxing social norms in Jazz Age America meant white tie was replaced by black tie as the default evening wear for young men, especially at nightclubs. According to The Delineator, the years after World War I saw white tie "almost abandoned". But it did still have a place: the American etiquette writer Emily Post stated in 1922 that "A gentleman must always be in full dress, tail coat, white waistcoat, white tie and white gloves" when at the opera, yet she called the tuxedo "essential" for any gentleman, writing that "It is worn every evening and nearly everywhere, whereas the tail coat is necessary only at balls, formal dinners, and in a box at the opera."

It also continued to evolve. White tie was worn with slim-cut trousers in the early 1920s; by 1926, wide-lapelled tailcoats and double-breasted waistcoats were in vogue. The Duke of Windsor (then Prince of Wales and later Edward VIII) wore a midnight blue tailcoat, trousers and waistcoat in the 1920s and 1930s both to "soften" the contrast between black and white and allow for photographs to depict the nuances of his tailoring. The late 1920s and 1930s witnessed a resurgence in the dress code's popularity, but by 1953, one etiquette writer stressed that "The modern trend is to wear 'tails' only for the most formal and ceremonious functions, such as important formal dinners, balls, elaborate evening weddings, and opening night at the opera".

The last president to have worn white tie at a United States presidential inauguration was President John F. Kennedy in 1961, who wore morning dress for his inauguration, and a white tie ensemble for his inauguration ball.

=== 21st century ===
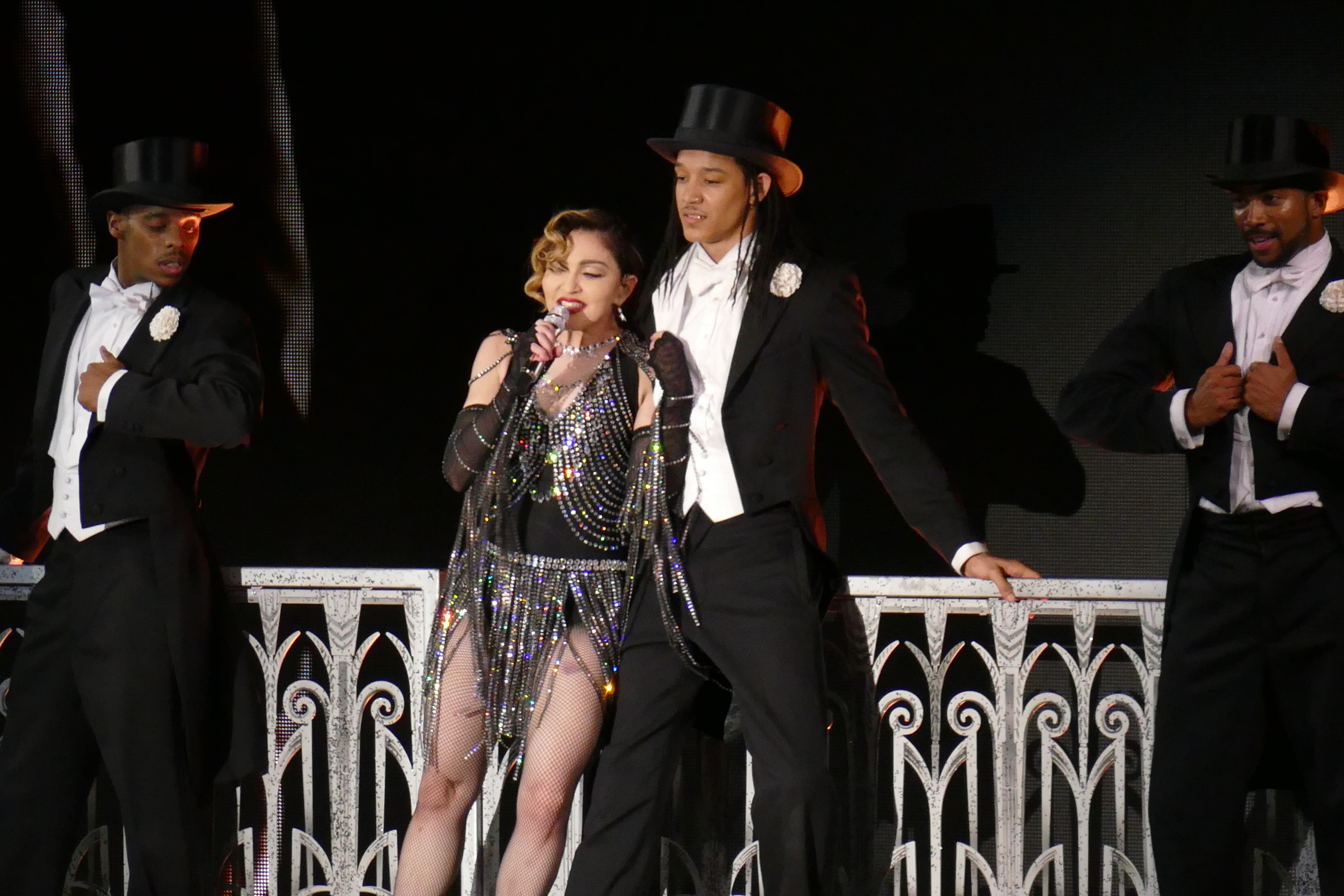
White tie worn by Madonna dance crew

While rare in the early 21st century, it survives as the formal dress code for royal and public ceremonies and audiences, weddings, balls, and a select group of other social events in some countries.

In London, it is still used by ambassadors attending the Christmas ball offered by King Charles III at Buckingham palace as well as the Lord Mayor dinner at Mansion House.

Notable international recurrent white tie events include the Nobel Banquet in Sweden and the Vienna Opera Ball in Austria.

In Scandinavia and the Netherlands, white tie is the traditional attire for doctoral conferments and is prescribed at some Swedish and Finnish universities, where it is worn with a top hat variant called a doctoral hat. At the universities in Uppsala and Lund in Sweden, it is still common for students to wear white tie at formal events. In Sweden and Finland, a black waistcoat is worn with white tie for academic occasions in the daytime. In the Netherlands, the attendants of the graduate student, called paranymphs, will also wear white tie.

Some fraternities such as Freemasons and Odd Fellows wear dress coats to their meetings.

==== United Kingdom ====
In Britain, it is worn at certain formal occasions such as state banquets, City of London livery dinners and certain balls at Oxford, Cambridge, Durham, Edinburgh and St Andrews universities. The president and officers of the Oxford Union are still required to wear white tie at every debate but since the 1930s, other speakers are only required to wear black tie.

==== United States ====
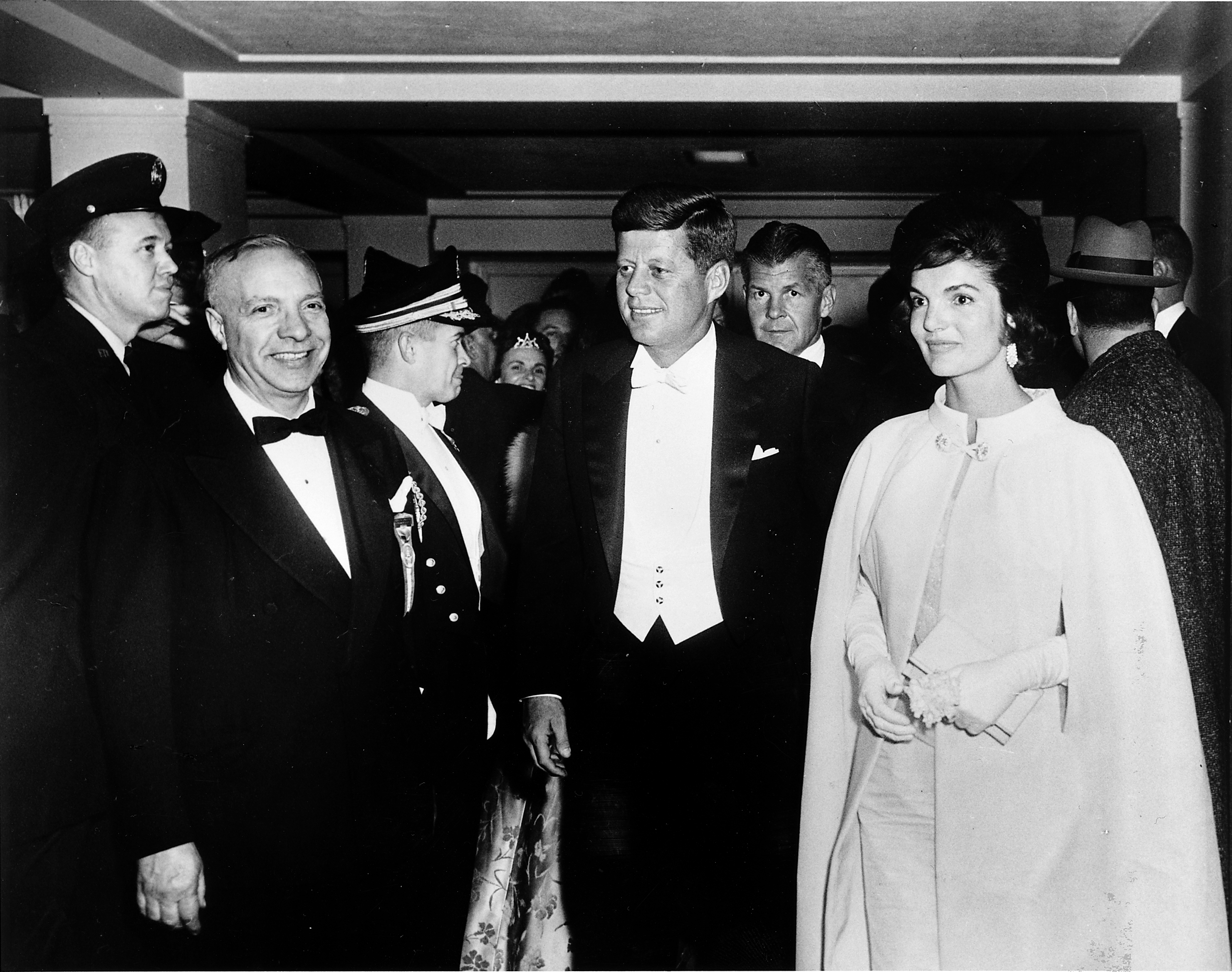
President John F. Kennedy, wearing white tie, and First Lady Jacqueline Kennedy, wearing a gown designed by Ethel Franken of Bergdorf Goodman, arrive at the D.C. Armory in Washington D.C. for an inaugural ball held on the evening of Inauguration Day, 20 January 1961.

A few state dinners at the White House apply white tie, such as the one held for Queen Elizabeth II in 2007. Notable annual white-tie dinners include the Gridiron Club Dinner in Washington, D.C., the Alfred E. Smith Memorial Foundation Dinner in New York City. White tie is also required at a few debutante balls such as the Viennese Opera Ball in New York and the International Debutante Ball in New York City, and the Veiled Prophet Ball in St. Louis. Some dance-focused balls require white tie, especially for waltz or quadrille.

In the southern United States, white tie is sometimes referred to as "costume de rigueur", adapted from French language due to the historical background of New France. It is sometimes used in invitations to masquerade balls and Mardi Gras celebrations, such as the Mardi Gras in Mobile, Alabama, or New Orleans Mardi Gras, Louisiana, emphasising the white tie expectations for men and full-length evening gowns for ladies.

The Metropolitan Museum of Art's Costume Institute Gala in New York City has occasionally had a white tie dress code, notably in 2014 for the "Charles James: Beyond Fashion" exhibit, and in 2022 for "Gilded Glamour". When it announced a white tie dress code in 2014, a number of media outlets pointed out the difficulty and expense of obtaining traditional white tie, even for the celebrity guests.

== Composition ==
According to the British etiquette guide Debrett's, the central components of full evening dress for men are a white marcella shirt with a wing collar and single cuffs, fastened with studs and cufflinks; the eponymous white marcella bow tie is worn around the collar, while a low-cut marcella waistcoat is worn over the shirt. Over this is worn a black double-breasted barathea wool or ultrafine herringbone tailcoat with silk faced peak lapels. The trousers have two galon down the outside of both legs. The correct shoes are patent leather court shoes. Although a white scarf and evening overcoat remains popular in winter, the traditional white gloves, top hats, canes and cloaks are now rare. Women wear a full-length evening dress, with the option of jewellery, a tiara, a pashmina, coat or wrap, and long white gloves.

The waistcoat should not be visible below the front of the tailcoat, which necessitates a medium or high waistline and often suspenders (braces) for the trousers. As one style writer for GQ magazine summarises "The simple rule of thumb is that you should only ever see black and white not black, white and black again". While Debrett's accepts double cuffs for shirts worn with white tie, most tailors and merchants suggest that single, linked cuffs are the most traditional and formal variation acceptable under the dress code. Double cuffs are not frequently worn or recommended with white tie. Decorations may also be worn and, unlike Debrett's, Cambridge University's Varsity student newspaper suggests a top hat, opera cloak and silver-topped cane are acceptable accessories.
