= Ball of Roses =

The Ball of Roses is a established debutante ball in Birmingham, Alabama. It is sponsored by the Ballet Guild of Birmingham and a fund-raiser for the Alabama Ballet.

== History ==
The Ball of Roses began in 1959 when the Ballet Guild of Birmingham was formed to serve as an auxiliary to the Birmingham Civic Ballet Association. The guild was organized to promote and foster development of ballet in Birmingham, as well as raise funds for its support. The founding of the Guild coincided with a local desire to re-establish the bygone days of Birmingham's debut balls.

The Ballet Guild decided to sponsor a large formal ball honoring the season's debutantes at The Country Club of Birmingham. The name "Ball of Roses" was chosen by the presidents of the Ballet Association Board of Trustees and of the Ballet Guild in 1960.

The first Ball of Roses was held in August 1961 in which eleven Birmingham debutantes were presented. The ball was so successful that the guild was encouraged to establish it as an annual event. Since then eligible young women from all over the South have been honored at the ball.

== Today ==
The ball follows traditions set forth at the first event. Set in a "garden-of-roses" atmosphere, each girl is presented on the arm of her father. She wears a long pastel gown with elbow-length white gloves. After the presentation and a father-daughter waltz, an evening of dancing follows.

Now in its forty-sixth year, the ball continues to benefit the Alabama Ballet, Inc. The Ballet Guild is an invitational organization of young women dedicated to supporting the ballet in Birmingham through fund raising and volunteer work. All honorees of the ball are invited to join the guild upon completion of their formal education.

== Sources ==
- 2006 Ball of Roses Program Guide
