= Gridiron Club =

Journalism organization based in Washington, D.C.

Gridiron Club and Foundation
- Gridiron grill logo
- Formation: January 24, 1885; 141 years ago
- Type: Nonprofit
- Tax ID no.: 36-4643320
- Location: Washington, D.C.
- Members: 65
- President: Dan Balz
- Former president: Al Hunt
- Historian: George E. Condon Jr.

The Gridiron Club is the oldest and most selective journalistic organization in Washington, D.C.

== History ==
"an elitist social club of sixty print journalists" — Hedrick Smith, Power Game: How Washington Works February 1988 Random House ISBN 9780394554471

Frank A. De Puy (1854–1927) was one of several who met January 24, 1885, at the Welcker's Hotel in Washington, D.C. – 721 15th Street, N.W., between New York Avenue and H Street – to form the Gridiron Club. De Puy was the last surviving founder of the club.

Its 65 active members represent major newspapers, news services, news magazines, and broadcast networks. Membership is by invitation only and was historically almost exclusive to prominent newspaper men, including newspaper Washington bureau chiefs.

For most of its history, the Club bylaws excluded women from becoming members or even guests at its annual dinner. Although the National Press Club began admitting women in 1971, the Gridiron was reluctant to follow suit. Women were first permitted as guests in 1972: several prominent women including several members of Congress, Coretta Scott King, and Katharine Graham, publisher of The Washington Post, were invited.

The Gridiron Club elected and admitted the first woman journalist members in 1975: Helen Thomas of United Press International and Frances Lewine of the Associated Press. Thomas would become the club's first woman president in 1993.

Eventually, the club began expanding beyond print journalism to include broadcast media figures such as Tim Russert of NBC News, Bob Schieffer of CBS News, Mara Liasson of National Public Radio, and Judy Woodruff of PBS.

The club merged with its charitable arm, the Gridiron Foundation, in 2008 to form the Gridiron Club and Foundation, a 501(c)(3) organization. The Club and Foundation make annual charitable contributions and provide scholarships to a number of journalistic organizations and colleges, including the University of Maryland, George Washington University, and Norwich University.

== Officers ==
The presidency of the club rotates annually. Carl Leubsdorf of the Dallas Morning News served as president in 2008, and Susan Page of USA Today in 2011, making them the first married couple to have each served as Gridiron president. Chuck Lewis of Hearst Newspapers served in 2013. Tom DeFrank served in 2022.

== Gridiron Club Dinner ==
The annual Gridiron Club Dinner is all off-the-record, and traditionally features the United States Marine Band, along with remarks by the President of the United States and satirical musical skits by the club members, and by the representatives of both political parties. The skits and speeches by the politicians are expected to "singe but not burn", be self-deprecating or otherwise sharply comedic.

Through 2020, every U.S. president since 1885 except Grover Cleveland has spoken at the dinner. (President Barack Obama attended the 2011 dinner after missing both the 2009 and 2010 dinners. In addition, he sang as a senator in 2006.) Bill and Hillary Clinton have both spoken at Club dinners, and the 2008 dinner marked the sixth time that President George W. Bush attended during his presidency. The 2013 dinner was the 125th Gridiron Club and Foundation Dinner, but technically only the fifth Club and Foundation dinner (following the 2008 merger of the Club and the Foundation into one entity).

The dinner is held in the spring, usually in March. Between 1945 and 2006, the dinner was held at the Capital Hilton. In November 1967, the club held its dinner and skits in Williamsburg, Virginia, outside Washington. In 2007, it moved to the Renaissance Washington DC Hotel. It is one of the few remaining large-scale, white-tie affairs in Washington.

In 1933, Eleanor Roosevelt held a "Gridiron Widows' party" in the East Room of the White House for Labor Secretary Frances Perkins and those women whose husbands attended the Gridiron Club Dinner, as her first protest against Gridiron exclusion of women, and by 1935 the annual event had grown into a "full-blown imitation".

Until 2011, the Gridiron Club and Foundation's annual show was strictly invitation only.

In 2011, the Gridiron Club and Foundation's annual show offered invites through the Harvard Club of Washington, D.C. for a Sunday afternoon post-dinner reception and performance, for March 13 from 3 p.m. to 6 p.m., one day after the dinner.

In 2017, the Gridiron Club and Foundation's annual show sold up to five tickets to the National Press Club members at $70 each, held 5 March 2017 in the Washington Renaissance Hotel, 999 Ninth Street NW, with a reception that began at 2 p.m. and the reprise (show) that began at 3 p.m. and ended at 5 p.m. It claims to offer a neutral ground on which political operatives, members of the press and elected officials can break bread together.

The Gridiron Club Dinner has been subject to criticism that it encourages journalists to engage in undue coziness with the political officials they are supposed to fairly cover, and also that the public spectacle of "playing footsie" with reporters' main subjects is bringing the political press into disgrace. This is also true of the White House Correspondents' Association Dinner and the Radio and Television Correspondents' Association Dinner.

In 1970, after the press's "sophomoric" skits Richard Nixon and Spiro Agnew performed Dixie to the ire of the one black attendee.

At the 2007 dinner, columnist Robert Novak impersonated Vice President Dick Cheney while satirizing the Scooter Libby case, which Novak helped initiate.

President Barack Obama attended the 2011, 2013, and 2015 Gridiron Club Dinners. President Donald Trump attended and addressed the 2018 Gridiron Club Dinner.

The Gridiron Dinner was not held in 2020 and 2021 due to the COVID-19 pandemic. The 2022 dinner on April 2 became a COVID superspreader event when at least 72 people tested positive, including Attorney General Merrick Garland, Agriculture Secretary Tom Vilsack, and Commerce Secretary Gina Raimondo. Proof of vaccination was required for entry, and no cases of serious illness were reported as resulting from the dinner.

== Gridiron Club Dinner remarks in the press ==
Reporters in the audience do file stories live, but the event's visuals and sounds are not recorded for publishing.

- Dick Cheney's Gridiron remarks
- Gridiron Club dinner
- Remarks by President Biden at the Gridiron Clu and Foundation dinner March 16, 2024
- Obama gets laughs at first Gridiron Club dinner as president
- Jokes From the Gridiron Club's Annual Dinner
- Gridiron greatest hits
- Here are President Obama’s full remarks from the Gridiron Club Dinner
- President Obama jokes about Clinton's Emails, Scott Walker and Marijuana at Gridiron Club dinner
- Gridiron Club
- Presidential one liners Gridiron Club
- Gridiron Club jokes congressional edition

== See also ==
- Alfred E. Smith Memorial Foundation Dinner
- American Society of News Editors
- International Debutante Ball
- National Press Club (United States)
- Radio and Television Correspondents' Association
- United States presidential inaugural balls
- Viennese Opera Ball in New York
- White House Correspondents' Association
