= Boston Cotillion =

The Boston Cotillion is an annual debutante ball held in Boston, Massachusetts, in the United States. It was first held in 1944 and was inactive between 1996 and 2001.

It is organized by The Boston Cotillion, Inc. and honors a prominent Vincent Memorial Hospital physician each year for his or her outstanding contributions to medicine. In 2007, it was held on June 15.
