= Amy Sullivan =

Amy Sullivan is a Chicago-based journalist who has covered religion and politics as an editor at Time, Yahoo! News, Washington Monthly, and National Journal. She contributes opinion and news analysis to outlets including NPR, the New York Times, and the Washington Post. Sullivan co-hosts the podcast Impolite Company with Nish Weiseth. Her first book, The Party Faithful: How and Why Democrats are Closing the God Gap, was published by Scribner in 2008.

Sullivan studied social sciences at the University of Michigan, Harvard Divinity School and Princeton University.

== Books ==
- The Party Faithful, 2008
