= Viennese Opera Ball in New York =

Annual charity gala

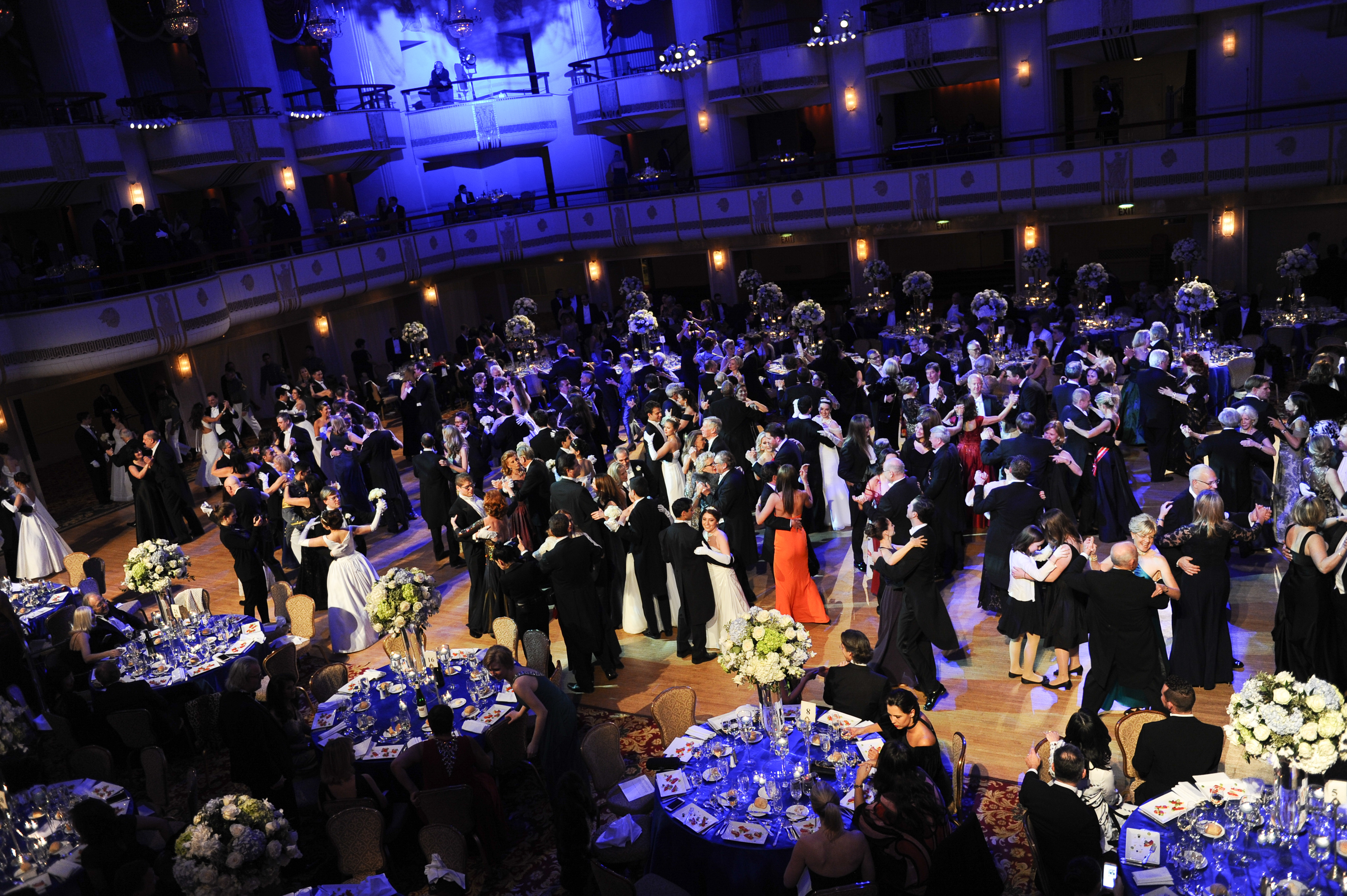
Viennese Opera Ball New York 2017 at the Waldorf Astoria Hotel NY

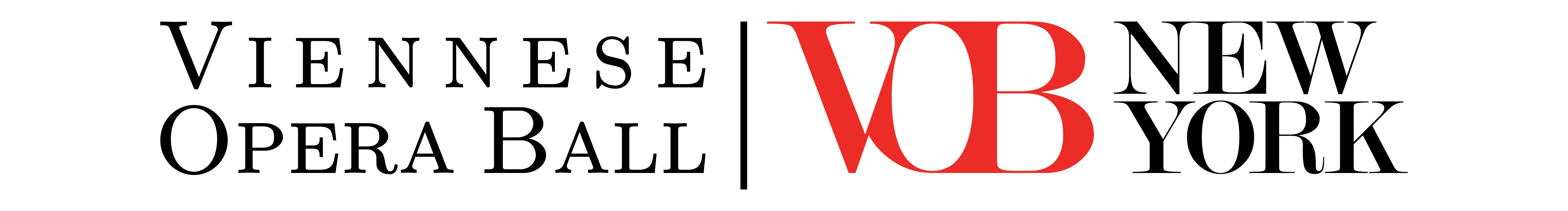
VOBNY Logo

The Viennese Opera Ball is an annual charity gala held annually under the auspices of the United States-Austrian Chamber of Commerce. The Ball is organized by Board of Directors, under President Silvia Frieser and Artistic Director Daniel Serafin.

The Ball features Opera, Classical Music and Ballroom Dancing including, of course, Waltzing. One popular highlight is the Midnight Quadrille, conducted by a Viennese choreographer. Following an 8 p.m. champagne reception, the Ball runs from 9:00 p.m. to 1:00 a.m., and includes a four-course dinner service. The “Tanz Bar” (post-Ball party) follows from 1:00 to 2:00 a.m. and includes a full buffet supper with the Viennese Opera Ball's Signature Goulash Soup, as well as multiple venues featuring: live dance music, a DJ and a Vienna Coffee House with Viennese pastries.

The Ball opens with the Grand March of Dignitaries and Diplomats. The ceremonial tone of the Ball Opening continues with the Presentation and Posting of the Flags by a West Point Color Guard. The Program continues with the Presentation of Debutantes (ages 16 to 26) and their dance Escorts (ages 18–28). A choreographed waltz routine by young ballroom dance couples is followed by a call for "Alles Walzer!" (Everyone Dance!) and guests join the dancers for the first official waltz of the Ball. A Viennese Orchestra plays continuous dance music throughout the Ball, stopping only for Program highlights or performances by the featured Opera singers.

== History ==
The Viennese Opera Ball in New York is a 501(c)(3) non-profit association. In May 2026, the ball celebrated its 70th anniversary.

The ball usually takes place in early February at Cipriani 42nd Street in Manhattan. It is considered one of the few 'white-tie' balls still in existence in the United States, i.e. the gentlemen come attired in white tie and dress coats with decorations and the ladies wear long floor-length ball gowns with decorations and opera gloves.

== Performances ==
Debutantes and their male partners (called Escorts) rehearse for one month prior to the ball. They are generally selected by recommendations from Committee members each year.

== Annual Themes ==
Each year there is a different theme: 2026 was the 70th Anniversary celebrating 270 years of Wolfgang Amadeus Mozart in a Magical Night - A Fairy Masquerade. 2005 -- 'Golden Jubilee' (in honor of the 50th anniversary of both the Ball and Free Austria); 2006 -- 'Mozart,' as the night of the ball fell on what would have been Mozart's 250th birthday; 2007 -- "Cinderella", complete with a ballet following the story of Cinderella and her night at "the ball" with Prince Charming; 2008 -- "Fairy Doll", inspired by composer Josef Bayer's children's tale; and, 2009 -- "Masked Night at the Opera", inspired by Strauss's "Prince Orlofsky's masked ball at his "villa" in "Die Fledermaus". More recently in 2018, the 63rd Viennese Opera Ball commemorated the 100th anniversary of Gustav Klimt's legacy.

== See also ==
- Alfred E. Smith Memorial Foundation Dinner
- Gridiron Club Dinner
- International Debutante Ball
- United States presidential inaugural balls
- White House Correspondents' Dinner
