= Jewel Ball =

The Jewel Ball is a debutante Ball in Kansas City, Missouri which benefits the Nelson-Atkins Museum of Art and the Kansas City Symphony.

== History ==
The Jewel Ball was founded in 1954 by Clara Burnham Hockaday and Enid Jackson Kemper as a fundraiser to support the Kansas City Philharmonic, now the Kansas City Symphony. The Ball has been held each year since its founding in 1954, with the exception of 2020, due to the Covid-19 pandemic. The ball is organized annually by an all-volunteer committee.

== Publications ==
The Jewel Ball by Heather N. Paxton (2004)
