= Gerald Ford =

President of the United States from 1974 to 1977

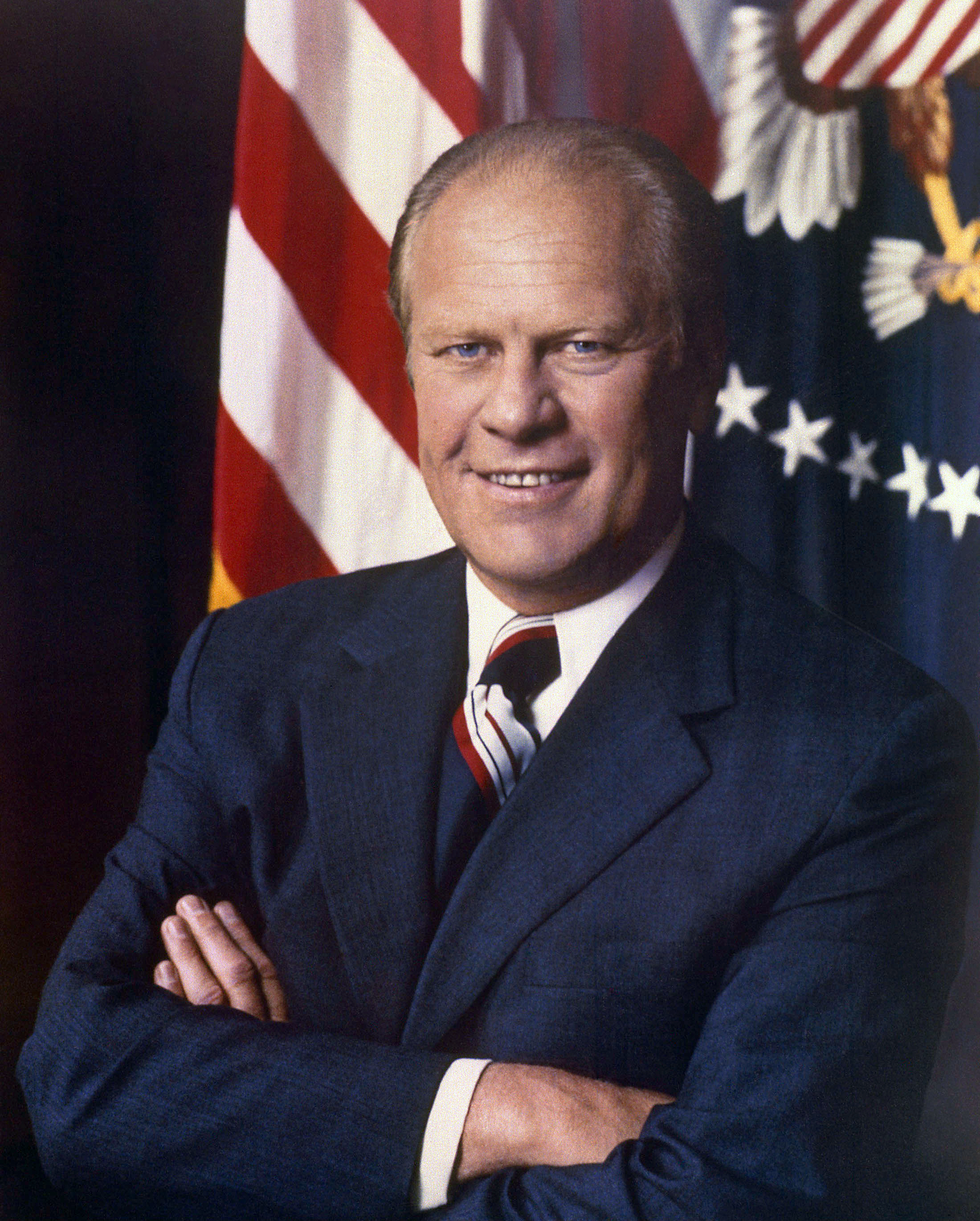
- Official portrait, 1974

38th President of the United States
- In office August 9, 1974 – January 20, 1977
- Vice President: Vacant (Aug–Dec 1974); Nelson Rockefeller (1974–1977)
- Preceded by: Richard Nixon
- Succeeded by: Jimmy Carter

40th Vice President of the United States
- In office December 6, 1973 – August 9, 1974
- President: Richard Nixon
- Preceded by: Spiro Agnew
- Succeeded by: Nelson Rockefeller

Member of the U.S. House of Representatives from Michigan's 5th district
- In office January 3, 1949 – December 6, 1973
- Preceded by: Bartel J. Jonkman
- Succeeded by: Richard Vander Veen
House positions
House Minority Leader
In office January 3, 1965 – December 6, 1973
Whip	Leslie C. Arends
Preceded by	Charles A. Halleck
Succeeded by	John Jacob Rhodes
Leader of the House Republican Conference
In office January 3, 1965 – December 6, 1973
Preceded by	Charles A. Halleck
Succeeded by	John Jacob Rhodes
Chair of the House Republican Conference
In office January 3, 1963 – January 3, 1965
Leader	Charles A. Halleck
Preceded by	Charles B. Hoeven
Succeeded by	Melvin Laird

Personal details
- Born: Leslie Lynch King Jr. July 14, 1913 Omaha, Nebraska, U.S.
- Died: December 26, 2006 (aged 93) Rancho Mirage, California, U.S.
- Resting place: Gerald R. Ford Presidential Museum
- Party: Republican
- Spouse: Betty Bloomer (m. 1948)
- Children: 4, including Steven and Susan
- Parents: Leslie Lynch King Sr.; Dorothy Ayer Gardner Ford
- Education: University of Michigan (BA); Yale University (LLB)

Military service
- Branch/service: United States Navy
- Years of service: 1942–1946
- Rank: Lieutenant Commander
- Battles/wars: World War II; Battle of the Philippine Sea
- Awards: American Campaign Medal; Asiatic–Pacific Campaign Medal (with 9 campaign stars); Philippine Liberation Ribbon (with 2 campaign stars); World War II Victory Medal
- Football career

No. 48
- Position: Center

Career information
- High school: Grand Rapids South High School
- College: Michigan (1932–1934)

Awards and highlights
- 2× National champion (1932, 1933); Meyer Morton Award (1932); Michigan Wolverines No. 48 retired

Other information
- Ford's voice Ford's inaugural address as president of the United States; Recorded August 9, 1974

Gerald Rudolph Ford Jr. (born Leslie Lynch King Jr.; July 14, 1913 – December 26, 2006) was the 38th president of the United States, serving from 1974 to 1977. He assumed the presidency after the resignation of Richard Nixon, under whom he served as the 40th vice president from 1973 to 1974 after the resignation of Spiro Agnew. A member of the Republican Party, Ford previously served in the United States House of Representatives from 1949 to 1973.

Ford was born in Omaha, Nebraska, and raised in Grand Rapids, Michigan. He attended the University of Michigan, where he also played for the university football team, winning two national championships, before eventually graduating from Yale Law School with a Bachelor of Laws. Afterward, he served in the U.S. Naval Reserve from 1942 to 1946. Ford was elected to the House of Representatives in 1948 from Michigan's 5th congressional district, and served in this capacity for nearly twenty-five years, the final eight of them as the House minority leader. During his career in the House, he was also part of the Warren Commission, which investigated the assassination of President John F. Kennedy. In December 1973, two months after the resignation of vice president Agnew, Ford was appointed to the vice presidency, becoming the first person appointed to become vice president under the terms of the twenty-fifth amendment. After the resignation of President Nixon in August 1974, Ford immediately assumed the presidency.

Domestically, Ford presided over the worst economy in the four decades since the Great Depression, with growing inflation and a recession. His presidency was also overshadowed by the Watergate Scandal. In one of his most controversial acts, he granted a presidential pardon to Nixon for his role in the Watergate scandal. Foreign policy was characterized in procedural terms by the increased role Congress began to play, and by the corresponding curb on the powers of the president. Ford signed the Helsinki Accords, which marked a move toward détente in the Cold War. With the collapse of South Vietnam eight months into his presidency, U.S. involvement in the Vietnam War essentially ended. In the 1976 Republican presidential primary, he narrowly defeated Ronald Reagan for the Republican nomination, but narrowly lost the general election to the Democratic candidate, Jimmy Carter. Ford remains the only person to serve as president without winning a presidential election for president or vice president.

After leaving office in 1977, Ford remained active in the Republican Party, but his moderate views on various social issues increasingly put him at odds with conservative members of the party in the 1990s and early 2000s. He also set aside the enmity he had felt towards Carter following the 1976 presidential election and the two former presidents developed a close friendship. After experiencing a series of health problems, he died at his home in Rancho Mirage, California, in 2006. Surveys of historians and political scientists have ranked Ford as a below-average president, though retrospective public polls on his time in office were more positive.

== Early life and education ==
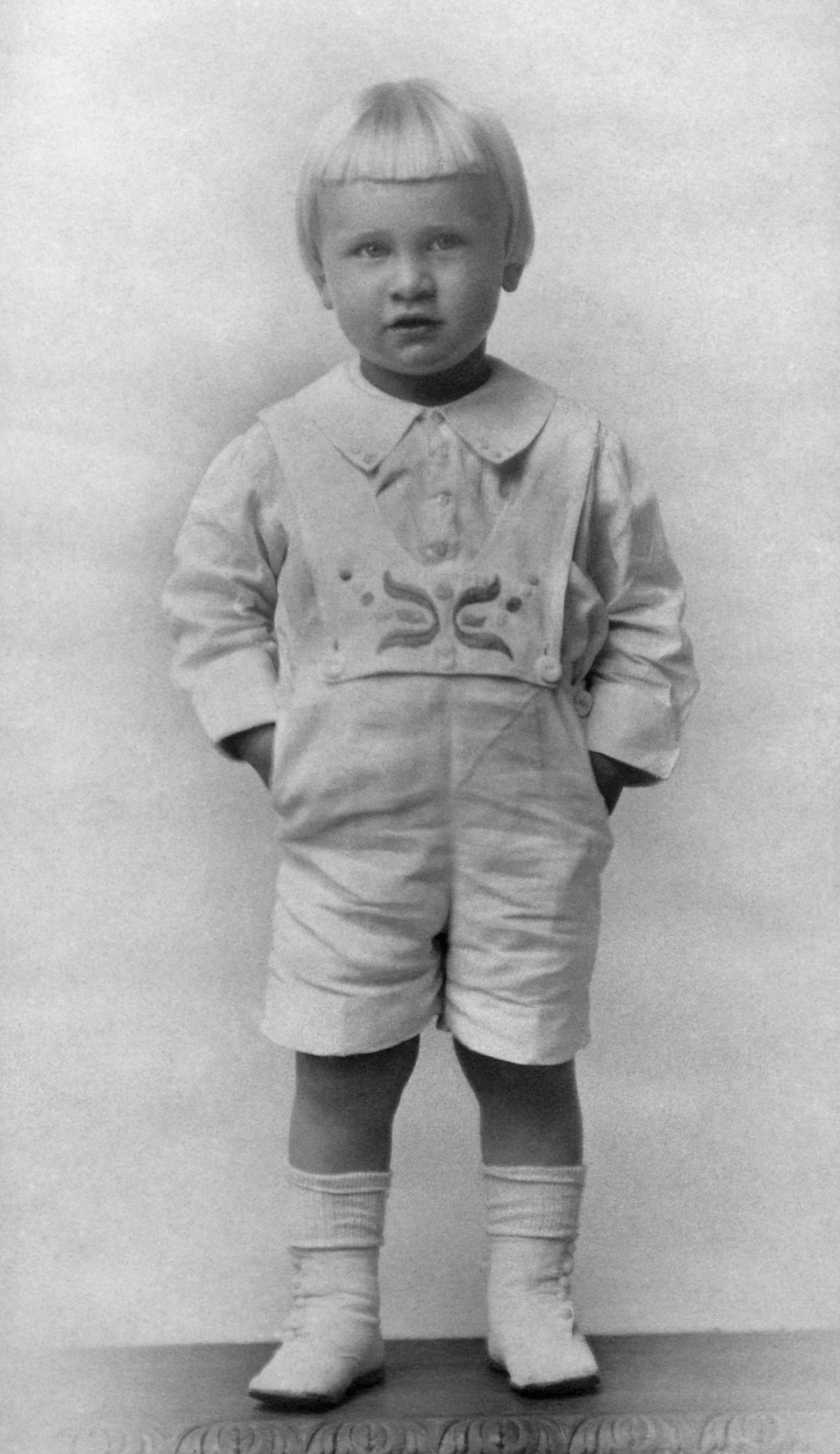
Ford (then Leslie Lynch King Jr.) at age three in 1916

Ford was born Leslie Lynch King Jr. on July 14, 1913, at 3202 Woolworth Avenue in Omaha, Nebraska, where his parents lived with his paternal grandparents. He was the only child of Dorothy Ayer Gardner and Leslie Lynch King Sr., a wool trader. His paternal grandfather was banker and businessman Charles Henry King, and his maternal grandfather was Illinois politician and businessman Levi Addison Gardner. Ford's parents separated just sixteen days after his birth and his mother took the infant Ford with her to Oak Park, Illinois, where her sister Tannisse and brother-in-law Clarence Haskins James lived at 410 N. Humphrey Ave. From there, she moved to the home of her parents in Grand Rapids, Michigan. Gardner and King divorced in December 1913, and she gained full custody of their son. Ford's paternal grandfather paid child support until shortly before his death in 1930.

Ford later said that his biological father had a history of hitting his mother. In a biography of Ford, James M. Cannon wrote that the separation and divorce of Ford's parents was sparked when, a few days after Ford's birth, Leslie King took a butcher knife and threatened to kill his wife, infant son, and Ford's nursemaid. Ford later told confidants that his father had first hit his mother when she had smiled at another man during their honeymoon.

After living with her parents for two and a half years, on February 1, 1917, Gardner married Gerald Rudolff Ford, a salesman in a family-owned paint and varnish company. Though never formally adopted, her young son was referred to as Gerald Rudolff Ford Jr. from then on; the name change, including the anglicized spelling "Rudolph", was formalized on December 3, 1935. He was raised in what is now East Grand Rapids with his three half-brothers from his mother's second marriage: Thomas Gardner "Tom" Ford (1918–1995), Richard Addison "Dick" Ford (1924–2015), and James Francis "Jim" Ford (1927–2001).

Ford attended Madison Elementary School from 1918 to 1925. He briefly transferred to East Grand Rapids Elementary School while his family lived nearby. He was involved in the Boy Scouts of America, and earned that program's highest rank, Eagle Scout in August 1927. He is the only Eagle Scout to serve as president. Ford attended Grand Rapids South High School, where he was a star athlete and captain of the football team, before graduating in 1931. In 1930, he was selected to the All-City team of the Grand Rapids City League. He also attracted the attention of college recruiters.

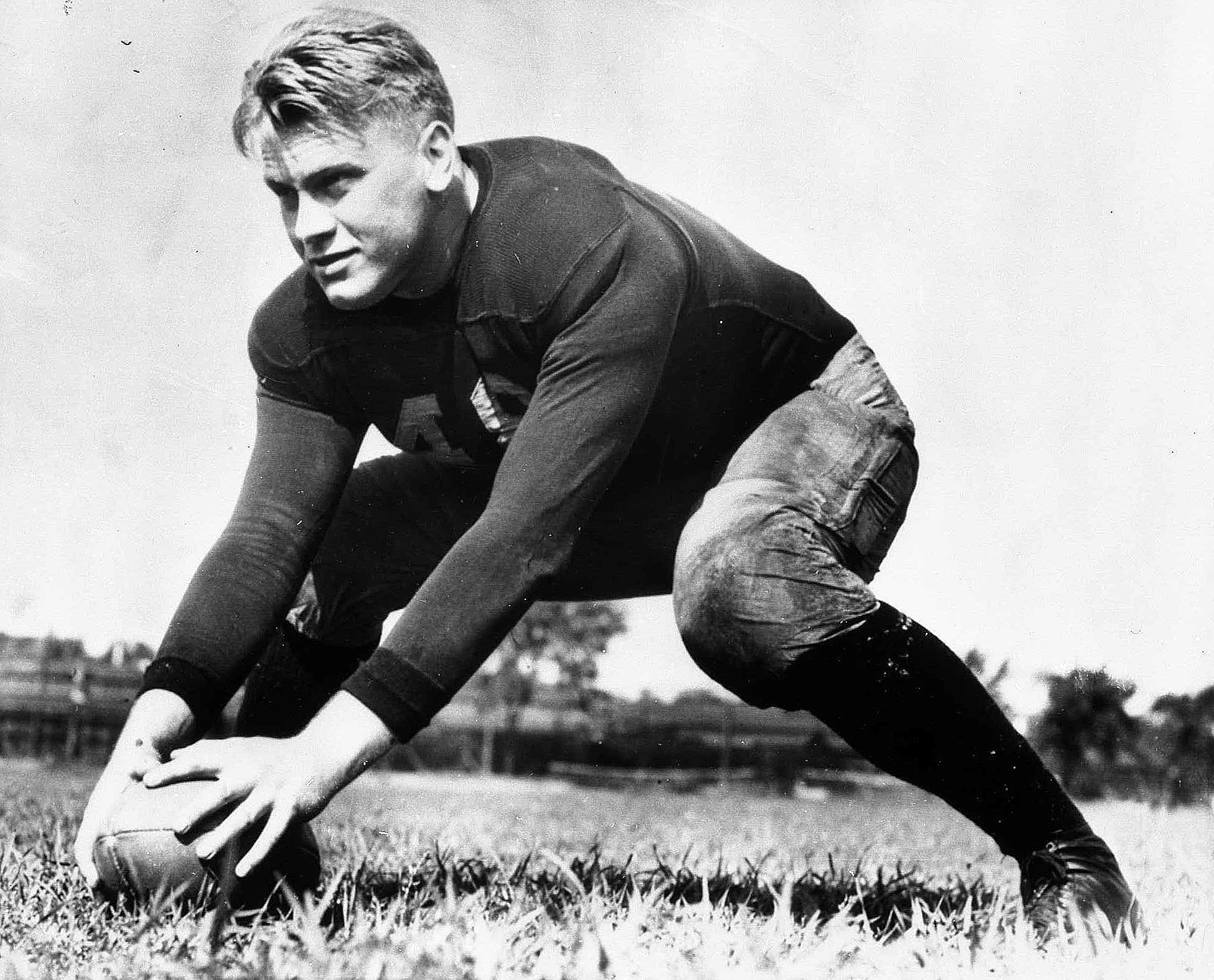
Ford as a center on the University of Michigan Wolverines football team, 1933

Ford attended the University of Michigan, where he played center and linebacker for the school's football team and helped the Wolverines to two undefeated seasons and national titles in 1932 and 1933. In his senior year of 1934, the team suffered a steep decline and won only one game, but Ford was still the team's star player. In one of those games, Michigan held heavily favored Minnesota—the eventual national champion—to a scoreless tie in the first half. After the game, assistant coach Bennie Oosterbaan said, "When I walked into the dressing room at halftime, I had tears in my eyes I was so proud of them. Ford and [Cedric] Sweet played their hearts out. They were everywhere on defense." Ford later recalled, "During 25 years in the rough-and-tumble world of politics, I often thought of the experiences before, during, and after that game in 1934. Remembering them has helped me many times to face a tough situation, take action, and make every effort possible despite adverse odds." His teammates later voted Ford their most valuable player, with one assistant coach noting, "They felt Jerry was one guy who would stay and fight in a losing cause."

During Ford's senior year, a controversy developed when Georgia Tech said that it would not play a scheduled game with Michigan if a Black player named Willis Ward took the field. Students, players and alumni protested, but university officials capitulated and kept Ward out of the game. Ford was Ward's best friend on the team, and they roomed together while on road trips. Ford reportedly threatened to quit the team in response to the university's decision, but he eventually agreed to play against Georgia Tech when Ward personally asked him to play.

In 1934, Ford was selected for the Eastern Team in the Shriners' East–West Shrine Game at San Francisco (a benefit for physically disabled children), played on January 1, 1935. As part of the 1935 Collegiate All-Star football team, Ford played against the Chicago Bears in the Chicago College All-Star Game at Soldier Field. In honor of his athletic accomplishments and his later political career, the University of Michigan retired Ford's No. 48 jersey in 1994. With the blessing of the Ford family, it was placed back into circulation in 2012 as part of the Michigan Football Legends program and issued to sophomore linebacker Desmond Morgan before a home game against Illinois on October 13.

Throughout life, Ford remained interested in his school and football; he occasionally attended games. Ford also visited with players and coaches during practices; at one point, he asked to join the players in the huddle. Before state events, Ford often had the Navy band play the University of Michigan fight song, "The Victors", instead of "Hail to the Chief".

Ford graduated from the University of Michigan in 1935 with a Bachelor of Arts degree in economics. He turned down offers from the Detroit Lions and Green Bay Packers of the National Football League. Instead, he took a job in September 1935 as the boxing coach and assistant varsity football coach at Yale University and applied to its law school.

Ford hoped to attend Yale Law School beginning in 1935. Yale officials at first denied his admission to the law school because of his full-time coaching responsibilities. In 1936, Ford worked as a seasonal park ranger at Yellowstone National Park's Canyon Station. He then spent the summer of 1937 as a student at the University of Michigan Law School and was eventually admitted in the spring of 1938 to Yale Law School. That year he was also promoted to the position of junior varsity head football coach at Yale. While at Yale, Ford began working as a model. He initially worked with the John Robert Powers agency before investing in the Harry Conover agency, with whom he modelled until 1941.

While attending Yale Law School, Ford joined a group of students led by R. Douglas Stuart Jr., and signed a petition to enforce the 1939 Neutrality Act. The petition was circulated nationally and was the inspiration for the America First Committee, a group determined to keep the U.S. out of World War II. His introduction into politics was in the summer of 1940 when he worked for the Republican presidential campaign of Wendell Willkie.

Ford graduated in the top third of his class in 1941, and was admitted to the Michigan bar shortly thereafter. In May 1941, he opened a Grand Rapids law practice with a friend, Philip W. Buchen.

== Military service ==
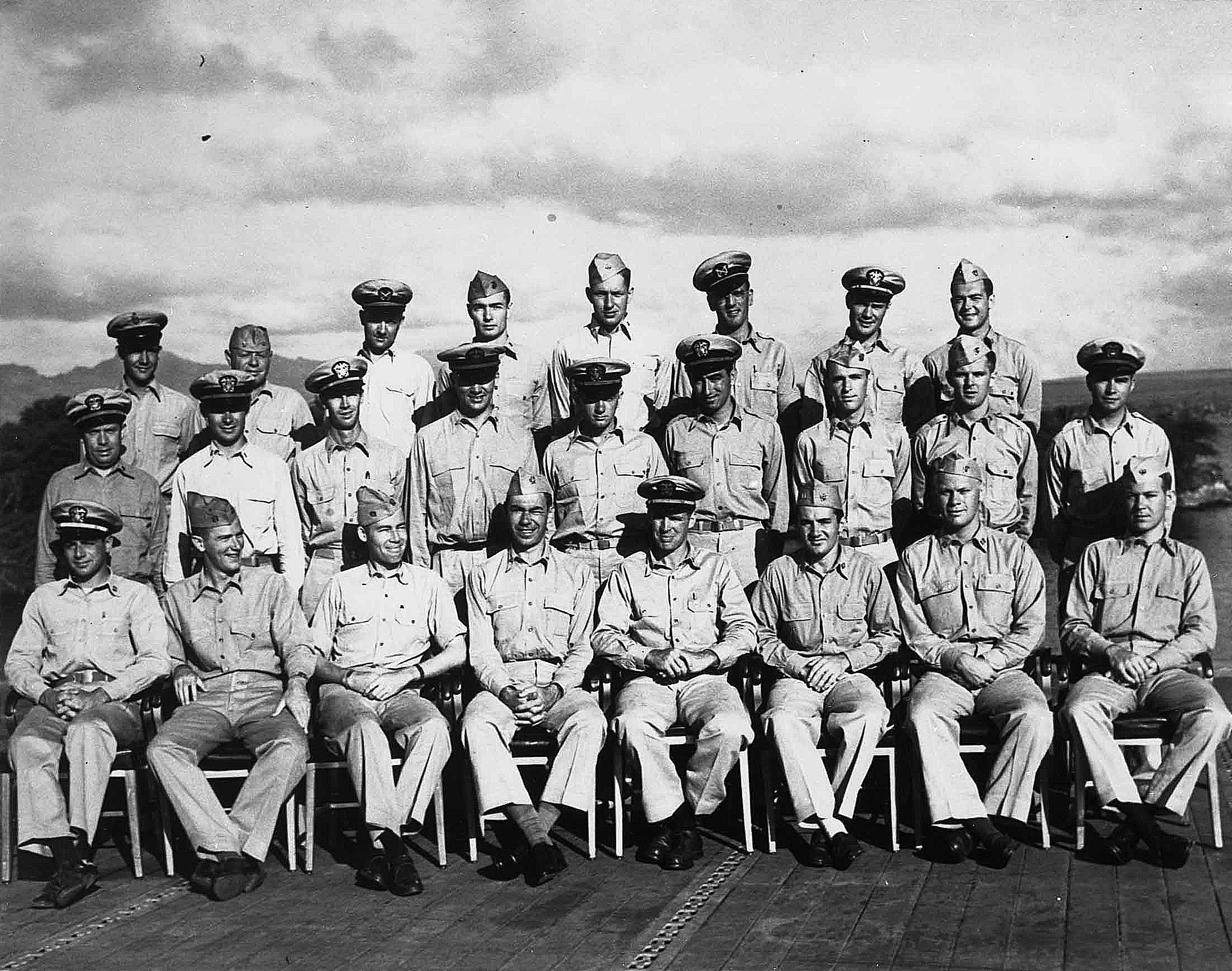
The Gunnery officers of USS Monterey, 1943. Ford is second from the right, in the front row.

Following the December 7, 1941, attack on Pearl Harbor, Ford enlisted in the Navy. He received a commission as ensign in the U.S. Naval Reserve on April 13, 1942. On April 20, he reported for active duty to the V-5 instructor school at Annapolis, Maryland. After one month of training, he went to Navy Preflight School in Chapel Hill, North Carolina, where he was one of 83 instructors and taught elementary navigation skills, ordnance, gunnery, first aid, and military drill. In addition, he coached all nine sports that were offered, but mostly swimming, boxing, and football. During the year he was at the Preflight School, he was promoted to Lieutenant, Junior Grade, on June 2, 1942, and to lieutenant, in March 1943.

=== Sea duty ===
After Ford applied for sea duty, he was sent in May 1943 to the pre-commissioning detachment for the new aircraft carrier USS Monterey (CVL-26), at New York Shipbuilding Corporation, Camden, New Jersey. From the ship's commissioning on June 17, 1943, until the end of December 1944, Ford served as the assistant navigator, Athletic Officer, and antiaircraft battery officer on board the Monterey. While he was on board, the carrier participated in many actions in the Pacific Theater with the Third and Fifth Fleets in late 1943 and 1944. In 1943, the carrier helped secure Makin Island in the Gilberts, and participated in carrier strikes against Kavieng, Papua New Guinea in 1943. During the spring of 1944, the Monterey supported landings at Kwajalein and Eniwetok and participated in carrier strikes in the Marianas, Western Carolines, and northern New Guinea, as well as in the Battle of the Philippine Sea. After an overhaul, from September to November 1944, aircraft from the Monterey launched strikes against Wake Island, participated in strikes in the Philippines and Ryukyus, and supported the landings at Leyte and Mindoro.

Although the ship was not damaged by Japanese forces, the Monterey was one of several ships damaged by Typhoon Cobra, which hit Admiral William Halsey Jr.'s Third Fleet on December 18–19, 1944. The Third Fleet lost three destroyers and over 800 men during the typhoon. The Monterey was damaged by a fire, which was started by several of the ship's aircraft tearing loose from their cables and colliding on the hangar deck. Ford was serving as General Quarters Officer of the Deck and was ordered to go below to assess the raging fire. He did so safely, and reported his findings back to the ship's commanding officer, Captain Stuart H. Ingersoll. The ship's crew was able to contain the fire, and the ship got underway again.

After the fire, the Monterey was declared unfit for service. Ford was detached from the ship and sent to the Navy Pre-Flight School at Saint Mary's College of California, where he was assigned to the Athletic Department until April 1945. From the end of April 1945 to January 1946, he was on the staff of the Naval Reserve Training Command, Naval Air Station, Glenview, Illinois, at the rank of lieutenant commander.

Ford received the following military awards: the American Campaign Medal, the Asiatic-Pacific Campaign Medal with nine 3/16" bronze stars (for operations in the Gilbert Islands, Bismarck Archipelago, Marshall Islands, Asiatic and Pacific carrier raids, Hollandia, Marianas, Western Carolines, Western New Guinea, and the Leyte Operation), the Philippine Liberation Medal with two 3/16" bronze stars (for Leyte and Mindoro), and the World War II Victory Medal. He was honorably discharged in February 1946.

== U.S. House of Representatives (1949–1973) ==
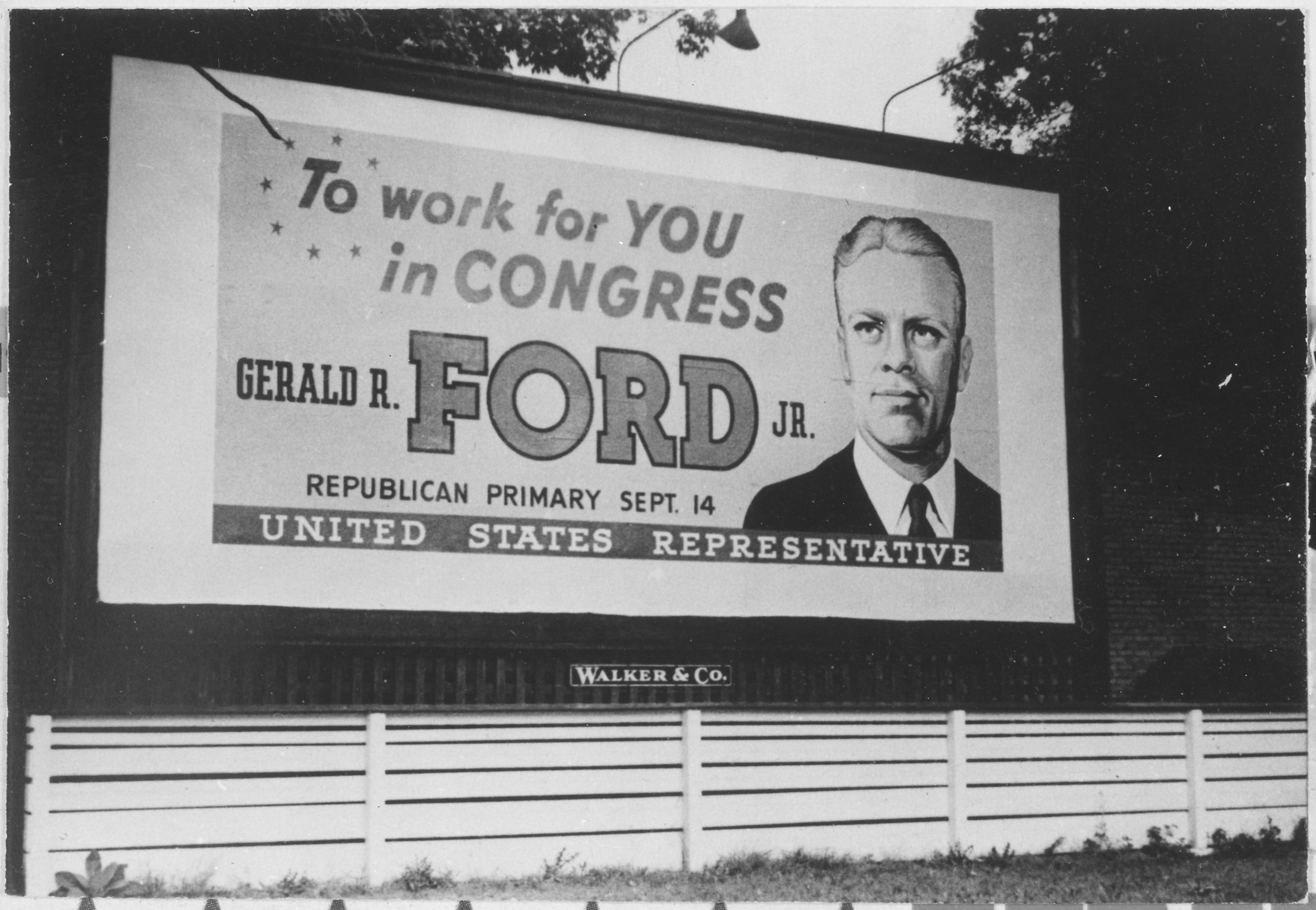
A billboard for Ford's 1948 congressional campaign from Michigan's 5th district

After Ford returned to Grand Rapids in 1946, he became active in local Republican politics, and supporters urged him to challenge Bartel J. Jonkman, the incumbent Republican congressman. Military service had changed his view of the world. "I came back a converted internationalist", Ford wrote, "and of course our congressman at that time was an avowed, dedicated isolationist. And I thought he ought to be replaced. Nobody thought I could win. I ended up winning two to one."

In 1947, Ford was briefly hired as a business manager for the Grand Rapids Rangers in the short-lived Professional Basketball League of America next to head coach Stan Szukala.

During his first campaign in 1948, Ford visited voters at their doorsteps and as they left the factories where they worked. Ford also visited local farms where, in one instance, a wager resulted in Ford spending two weeks milking cows following his election victory.

Ford was a member of the House of Representatives for 25 years, holding Michigan's 5th congressional district seat from 1949 to 1973. It was a tenure known for its modesty. As an editorial in The New York Times described him, Ford "saw himself as a negotiator and a reconciler, and the record shows it: he did not write a single piece of major legislation in his entire career." Appointed to the United States House Committee on Appropriations two years after being elected, he was a prominent member of the United States House Appropriations Subcommittee on Defense. Ford described his philosophy as "a moderate in domestic affairs, an internationalist in foreign affairs, and a conservative in fiscal policy." He voted in favor of the Civil Rights Acts of 1957, 1960, 1964, and 1968, as well as the 24th Amendment to the U.S. Constitution and the Voting Rights Act of 1965. Ford was known to his colleagues in the House as a "Congressman's Congressman".

In the early 1950s, Ford declined offers to run for either the U.S. Senate or the Michigan governorship. Rather, his ambition was to become Speaker of the House, which he called "the ultimate achievement. To sit up there and be the head honcho of 434 other people and have the responsibility, aside from the achievement, of trying to run the greatest legislative body in the history of mankind ... I think I got that ambition within a year or two after I was in the House of Representatives".

=== Warren Commission ===
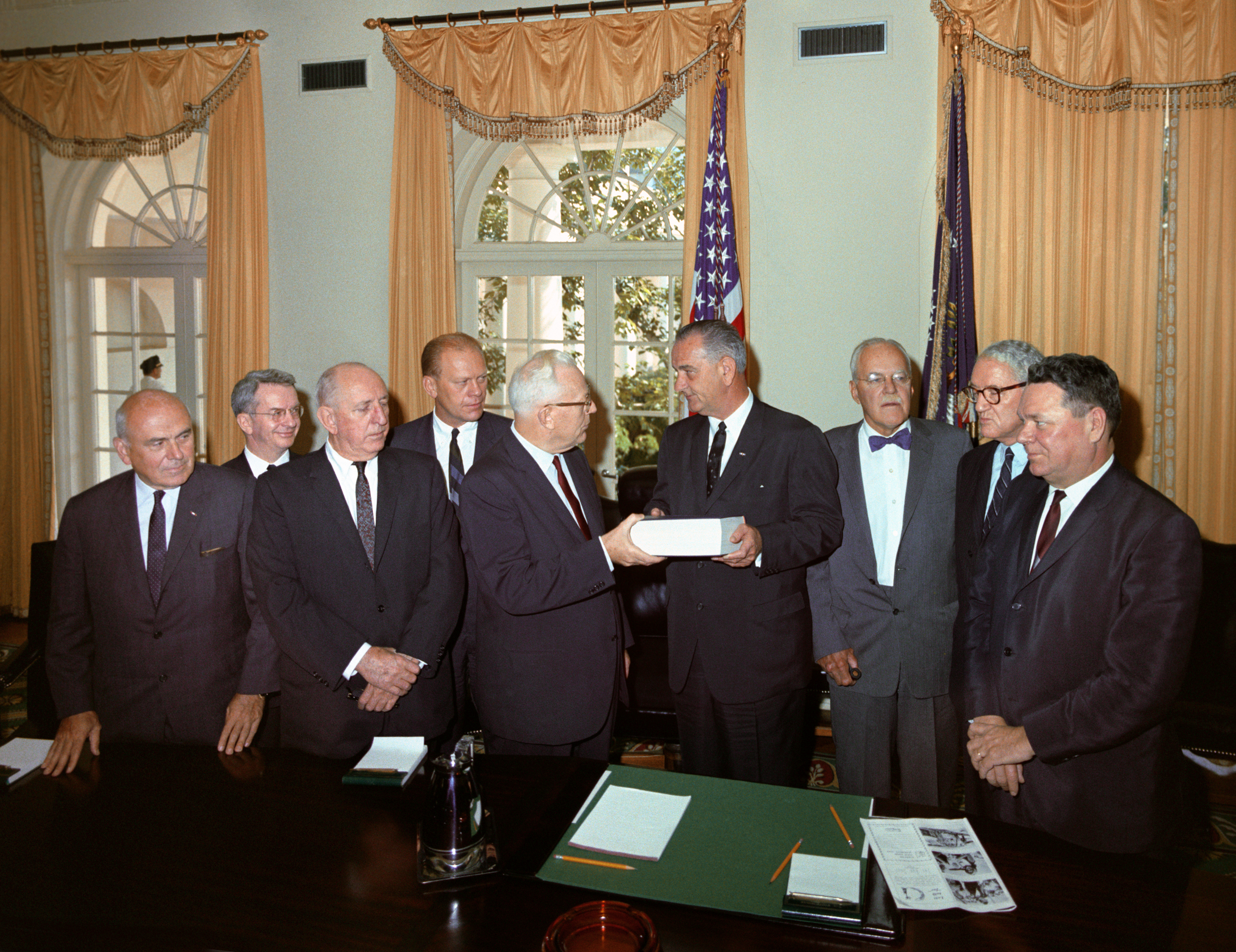
The Warren Commission (with Ford fourth from left) presenting its report to President Lyndon B. Johnson in 1964.

On November 29, 1963, President Lyndon B. Johnson appointed Ford to the Warren Commission, a special task force set up to investigate the assassination of President John F. Kennedy. Ford was assigned to prepare a biography of accused assassin Lee Harvey Oswald. He and Earl Warren also interviewed Jack Ruby, Oswald's killer. According to a 1963 FBI memo that was released to the public in 2008, Ford was in contact with the FBI throughout his time on the Warren Commission and relayed information to the deputy director, Cartha DeLoach, about the panel's activities. In 1965, he published Portrait of the Assassin, co-written with John R. Stiles, which defended the Warren Report. It has been described as essentially the Warren Report repackaged as a non-fiction book. Again, in the preface to his 2007 book, A Presidential Legacy and The Warren Commission, Ford defended the work of the commission and reiterated his support of its conclusions.

=== House Minority Leader (1965–1973) ===
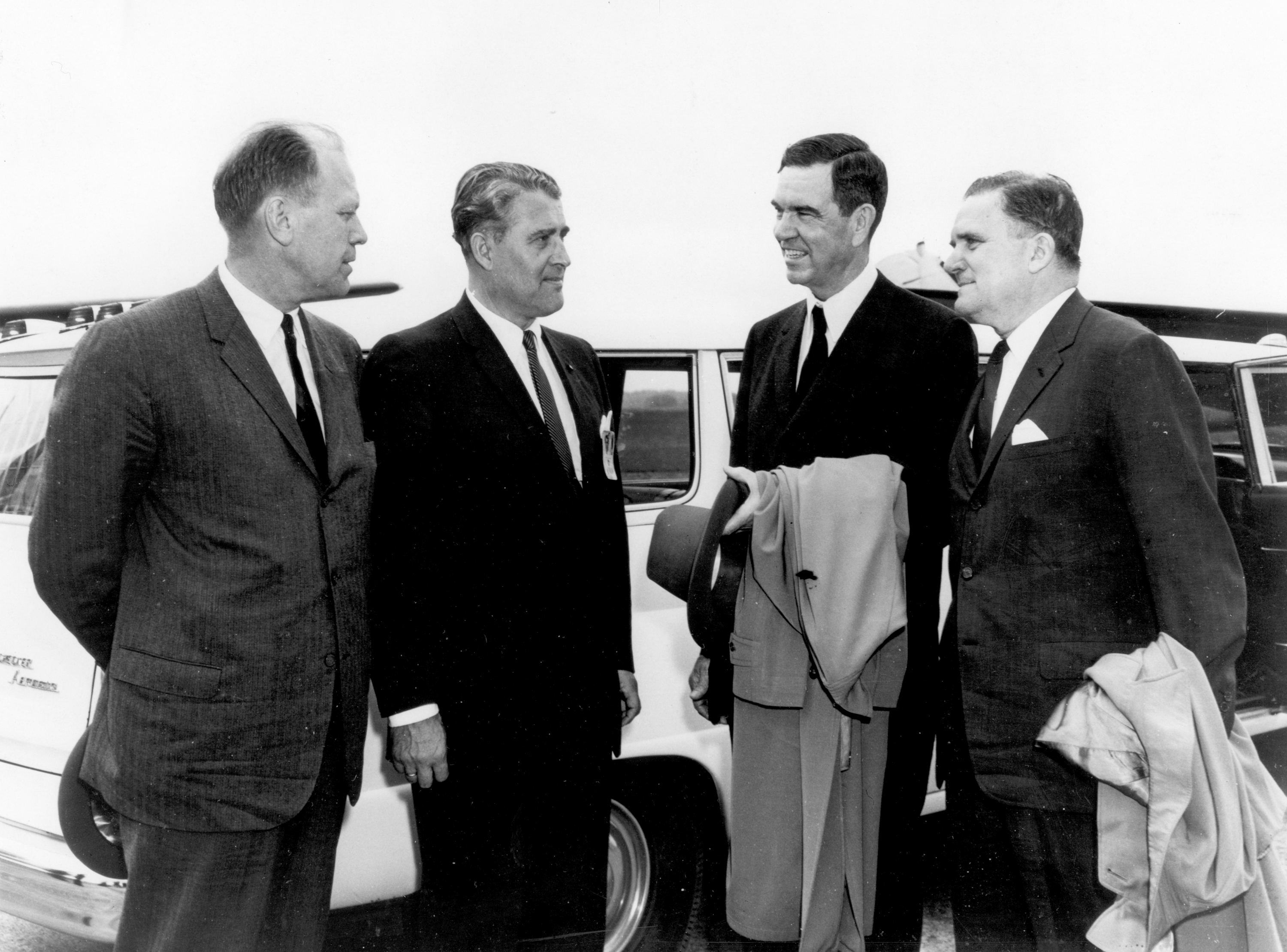
Congressman Ford, MSFC director Wernher von Braun, Congressman George H. Mahon, and NASA Administrator James E. Webb visiting the Marshall Space Flight Center for a briefing on the Saturn program, 1964.

In 1964, Lyndon Johnson led a landslide victory for his party, secured another term as president and took 36 seats from Republicans in the House of Representatives. Following the election, members of the Republican caucus looked to select a new minority leader. Three members approached Ford to see if he would be willing to serve; after consulting with his family, he agreed. After a closely contested election, Ford was chosen to replace Charles Halleck of Indiana as minority leader. The members of the Republican caucus that encouraged and eventually endorsed Ford to run as the House minority leader were later known as the "Young Turks". One of the members of the Young Turks was congressman Donald H. Rumsfeld from Illinois's 13th congressional district, who later on would serve in Ford's administration as the chief of staff and secretary of defense.

With a Democratic majority in both the House of Representatives and the Senate, the Johnson Administration proposed and passed a series of programs that was called by Johnson the "Great Society". During the first session of the Eighty-ninth Congress alone, the Johnson Administration submitted 87 bills to Congress, and Johnson signed 84, or 96%, arguably the most successful legislative agenda in Congressional history.

In 1966, criticism over the Johnson Administration's handling of the Vietnam War began to grow, with Ford and Congressional Republicans expressing concern that the United States was not doing what was necessary to win the war. Public sentiment also began to move against Johnson, and the 1966 midterm elections produced a 47-seat swing in favor of the Republicans. This was not enough to give Republicans a majority in the House, but the victory gave Ford the opportunity to prevent the passage of further Great Society programs.

Ford's private criticism of the Vietnam War became public knowledge after he spoke from the floor of the House and questioned whether the White House had a clear plan to bring the war to a successful conclusion. The speech angered President Johnson, who accused Ford of having played "too much football without a helmet".

As minority leader in the House, Ford appeared in a popular series of televised press conferences with Illinois Senator Everett Dirksen, in which they proposed Republican alternatives to Johnson's policies. Many in the press jokingly called this "The Ev and Jerry Show". Johnson said at the time, "Jerry Ford is so dumb he can't fart and chew gum at the same time." The press, used to sanitizing Johnson's language, reported this as "Gerald Ford can't walk and chew gum at the same time."

After Richard Nixon was elected president in November 1968, Ford's role shifted to being an advocate for the White House agenda. Congress passed several of Nixon's proposals, including the National Environmental Policy Act and the Tax Reform Act of 1969. Another high-profile victory for the Republican minority was the State and Local Fiscal Assistance Act. Passed in 1972, the act established a revenue sharing program for state and local governments. Ford's leadership was instrumental in shepherding revenue sharing through Congress, and resulted in a bipartisan coalition that supported the bill with 223 votes in favor (compared with 185 against).

During the eight years from 1965 to 1973 that Ford served as minority leader, he received many friends in the House because of his fair leadership and inoffensive personality.

== Vice presidency (1973–1974) ==
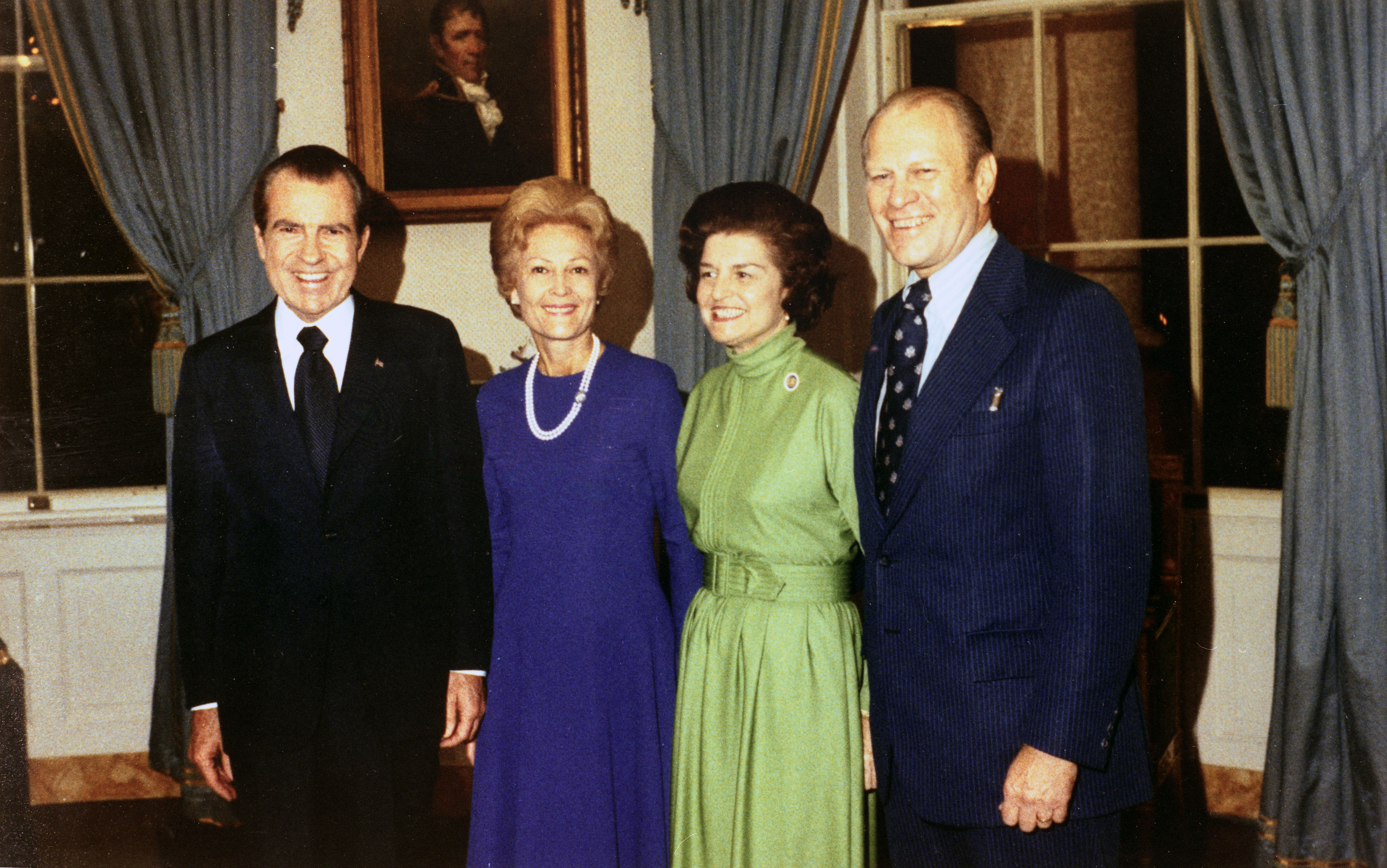
Ford and his wife Betty with President Richard Nixon and First Lady Pat Nixon after he became vice president, October 13, 1973

For the past decade, Ford had been unsuccessfully working to help Republicans across the country get a majority in the chamber so that he could become House Speaker. He promised his wife that he would try again in 1974 then retire in 1976. However, on October 10, 1973, Spiro Agnew resigned from the vice presidency. According to The New York Times, Nixon "sought advice from senior Congressional leaders about a replacement." The advice was unanimous. House Speaker Carl Albert recalled later, "We gave Nixon no choice but Ford." Ford agreed to the nomination, telling his wife that the vice presidency would be "a nice conclusion" to his career. Ford was nominated to take Agnew's position on October 12, the first time the vice-presidential vacancy provision of the 25th Amendment had been implemented. The United States Senate voted 92 to 3 to confirm Ford on November 27. On December 6, the House confirmed Ford by a vote of 387 to 35. After the confirmation vote in the House, Ford took the oath of office as vice president.

Ford became vice president as the Watergate scandal was unfolding. On August 1, 1974, Chief of Staff Alexander Haig contacted Ford to tell him to prepare for the presidency. At the time, Ford and his wife, Betty, were living in suburban Virginia, waiting for their expected move into the newly designated vice president's residence in Washington, D.C. However, "Al Haig asked to come over and see me", Ford later said, "to tell me that there would be a new tape released on a Monday, and he said the evidence in there was devastating and there would probably be either an impeachment or a resignation. And he said, 'I'm just warning you that you've got to be prepared, that things might change dramatically and you could become President.' And I said, 'Betty, I don't think we're ever going to live in the vice president's house.'"

== Presidency (1974–1977) ==
=== Swearing-in ===
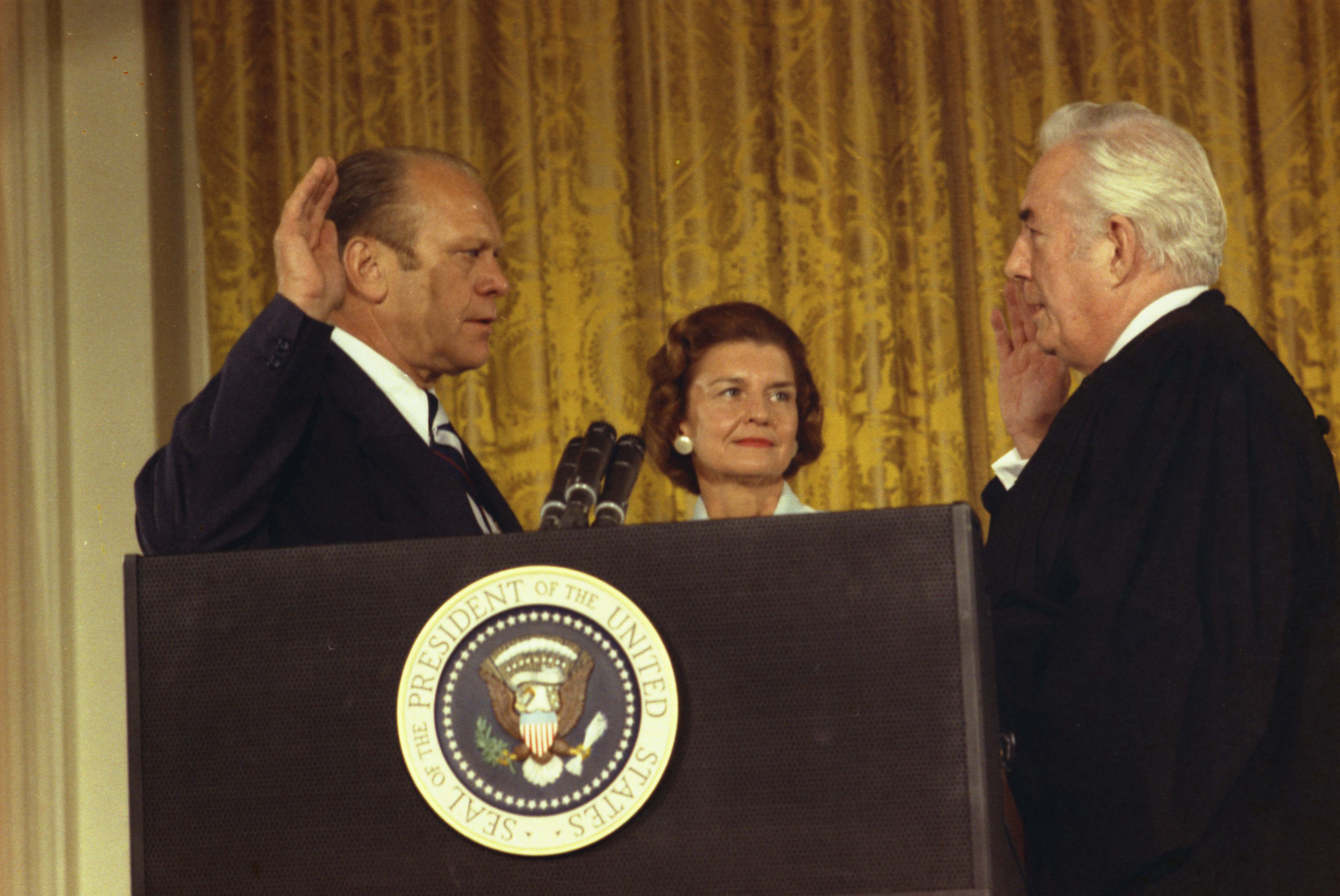
Ford taking the presidential oath of office administered by Chief Justice Warren Burger in the White House East Room, while Betty Ford looks on.

When Nixon resigned on August 9, 1974, Ford automatically assumed the presidency, taking the oath of office in the East Room of the White House. This made him the only person to become the nation's chief executive without being elected to the presidency or the vice presidency. Immediately afterward, he spoke to the assembled audience in a speech that was broadcast live to the nation, noting the peculiarity of his position. He later declared that "our long national nightmare is over".

=== Nominating Rockefeller ===
On August 20, Ford nominated former New York Governor Nelson Rockefeller to fill the vice presidency he had vacated. Rockefeller's top competitor had been George H. W. Bush. Rockefeller underwent extended hearings before Congress, which caused embarrassment when it was revealed he made large gifts to senior aides, such as Henry Kissinger. Although conservative Republicans were not pleased that Rockefeller was picked, most of them voted for his confirmation, and his nomination passed both the House and Senate. Some, including Barry Goldwater, voted against him.

=== Pardon of Nixon ===
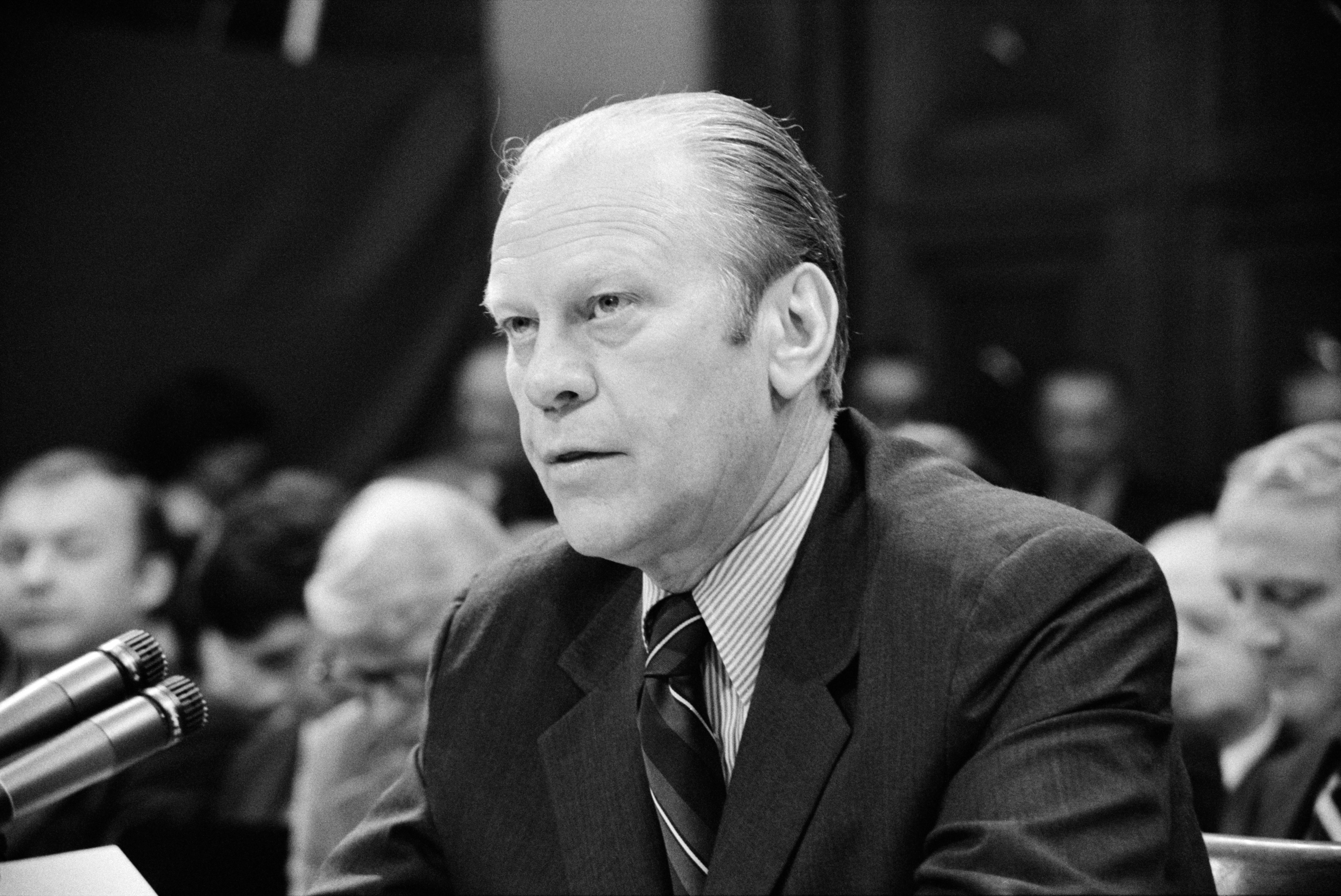
Ford appearing at a House Judiciary Subcommittee hearing in reference to his pardon of Richard Nixon.

On September 8, 1974, Ford issued Proclamation 4311, which gave Nixon a full and unconditional pardon for any crimes he might have committed against the United States while president. In a televised broadcast to the nation, Ford explained that he felt the pardon was in the best interests of the country, and that the Nixon family's situation "is a tragedy in which we all have played a part. It could go on and on and on, or someone must write the end to it. I have concluded that only I can do that, and if I can, I must."

Ford's decision to pardon Nixon was highly controversial. Critics derided the move and said a "corrupt bargain" had been struck between the two men, in which Ford's pardon was granted in exchange for Nixon's resignation, elevating Ford to the presidency. Ford's first press secretary and close friend Jerald terHorst resigned his post in protest after the pardon. According to Bob Woodward, Nixon Chief of Staff Alexander Haig proposed a pardon deal to Ford. He later decided to pardon Nixon for other reasons, primarily the friendship he and Nixon shared. Regardless, historians believe the controversy was one of the major reasons Ford lost the 1976 presidential election, an observation with which Ford agreed. In an editorial at the time, The New York Times stated that the Nixon pardon was a "profoundly unwise, divisive and unjust act" that in a stroke had destroyed the new president's "credibility as a man of judgment, candor and competence". On October 17, 1974, Ford testified before Congress on the pardon. He was the first sitting president since Abraham Lincoln to testify before the House of Representatives.

In the months following the pardon, Ford often declined to mention President Nixon by name, referring to him in public as "my predecessor" or "the former president". When Ford was pressed on the matter on a 1974 trip to California, White House correspondent Fred Barnes recalled that he replied "I just can't bring myself to do it."

After Ford left the White House in January 1977, he privately justified his pardon of Nixon by carrying in his wallet a portion of the text of Burdick v. United States, a 1915 U.S. Supreme Court decision which stated that a pardon indicated a presumption of guilt, and that acceptance of a pardon was tantamount to a confession of that guilt. In 2001, the John F. Kennedy Presidential Library and Museum awarded the John F. Kennedy Profile in Courage Award to Ford for his pardon of Nixon. In presenting the award to Ford, Senator Ted Kennedy said that he had initially been opposed to the pardon, but later decided that history had proven Ford to have made the correct decision.

=== Draft dodgers and deserters ===
On September 16, 1974, Ford issued Presidential Proclamation 4313, which introduced a conditional amnesty program for military deserters and Vietnam War draft dodgers who had fled to countries such as Canada. The conditions of the amnesty required that those reaffirm their allegiance to the United States and serve two years working in a public service job or a total of two years service for those who had served less than two years of honorable service in the military. The program for the Return of Vietnam Era Draft Evaders and Military Deserters established a Clemency Board to review the records and make recommendations for receiving a presidential pardon and a change in military discharge status. Full pardon for draft dodgers came during the Presidency of Jimmy Carter.

=== Administration ===
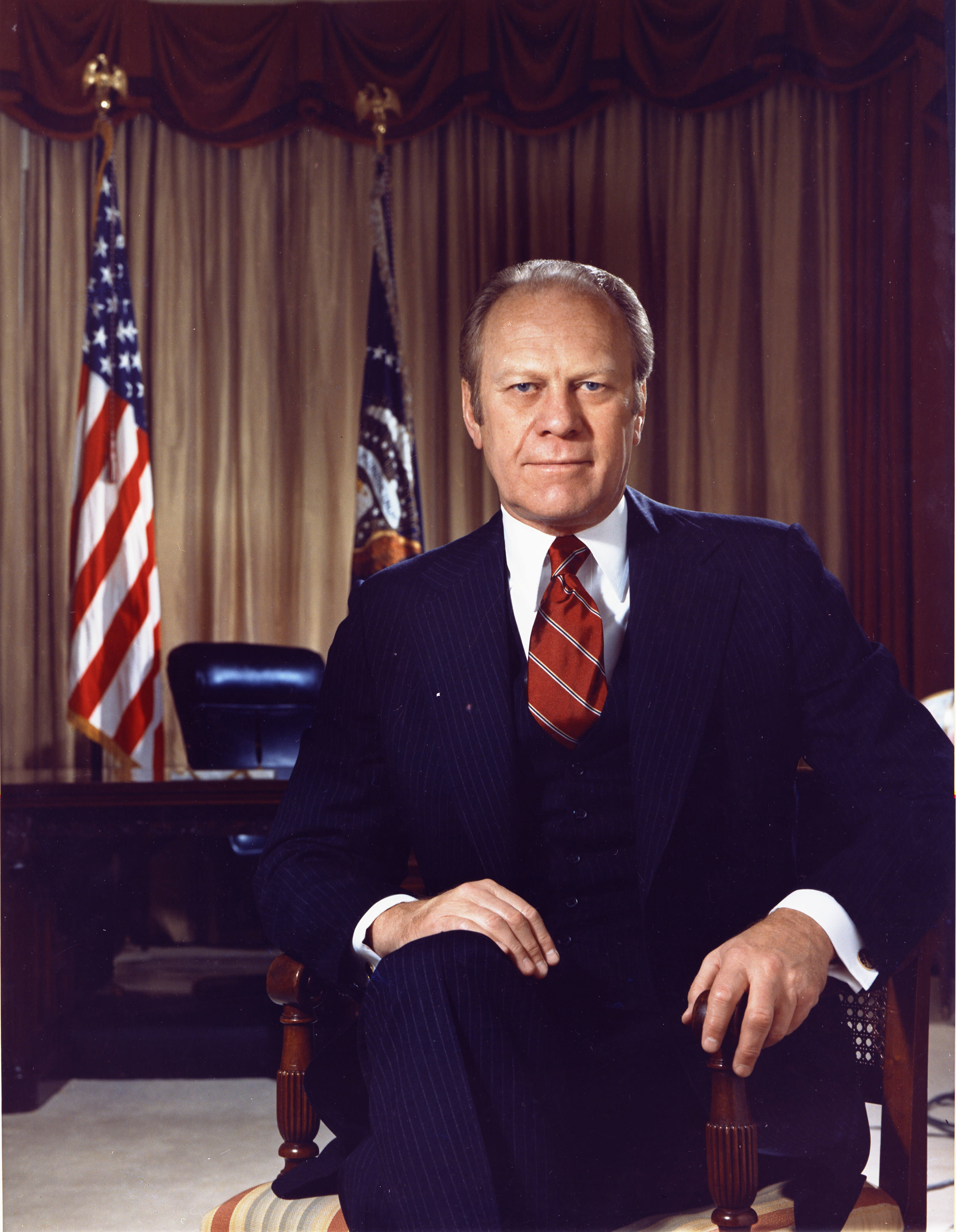
Second official portrait of President Ford, February 1976

When Ford assumed office, he inherited Nixon's Cabinet. During his brief administration, he replaced all members except Secretary of State Kissinger and Secretary of the Treasury William E. Simon. Political commentators have referred to Ford's dramatic reorganization of his Cabinet in the fall of 1975 as the "Halloween Massacre". One of Ford's appointees, William Thaddeus Coleman Jr.—the United States Secretary of Transportation—was the second Black man to serve in a presidential cabinet (after Robert C. Weaver) and the first appointed in a Republican administration.

Ford selected George H. W. Bush as Chief of the U.S. Liaison Office to the People's Republic of China in 1974, and then Director of the Central Intelligence Agency in late 1975.

Ford's transition chairman and first Chief of Staff was former congressman and ambassador Donald Rumsfeld. In 1975, Rumsfeld was named by Ford as the youngest-ever United States Secretary of Defense. Ford chose a young Wyoming politician, Dick Cheney, to replace Rumsfeld as his new Chief of Staff; Cheney became the campaign manager for Ford's 1976 presidential campaign.

=== Midterm elections ===
The 1974 Congressional midterm elections took place in the wake of the Watergate scandal and less than three months after Ford assumed office. The Democratic Party turned voter dissatisfaction into large gains in the House elections, taking 49 seats from the Republican Party, increasing their majority to 291 of the 435 seats. This was one more than the number needed (290) for a two-thirds majority, the number necessary to override a presidential veto or to propose a constitutional amendment. Perhaps due in part to this fact, the 94th Congress overrode the highest percentage of vetoes since Andrew Johnson was President of the United States (1865–1869). Even Ford's former, reliably Republican House seat was won by a Democrat, Richard Vander Veen, who defeated Robert VanderLaan. In the Senate elections, the Democratic majority became 61 in the 100-seat body.

=== Domestic policy ===
==== Inflation ====
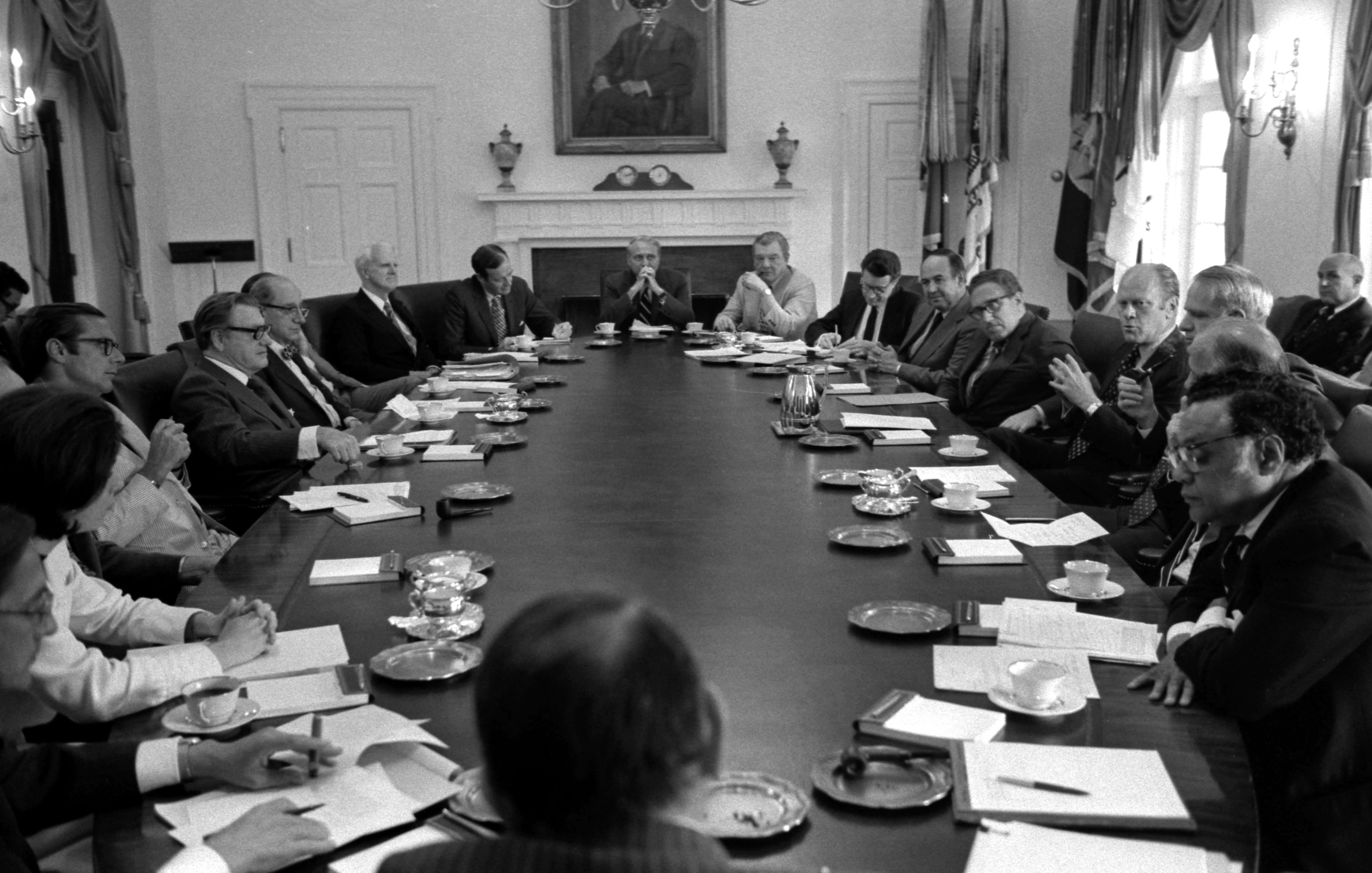
Ford meeting with his Cabinet, 1975

The economy was a great concern during the Ford administration. One of the first acts the new president took to deal with the economy was to create, by Executive Order on September 30, 1974, the Economic Policy Board. In October 1974, in response to rising inflation, Ford went before the American public and asked them to "Whip Inflation Now". As part of this program, he urged people to wear "WIN" buttons. At the time, inflation was believed to be the primary threat to the economy, more so than growing unemployment; there was a belief that controlling inflation would help reduce unemployment. To rein in inflation, it was necessary to control the public's spending. To try to mesh service and sacrifice, "WIN" called for Americans to reduce their spending and consumption. On October 4, 1974, Ford gave a speech in front of a joint session of Congress; as a part of this speech he kicked off the "WIN" campaign. Over the next nine days, 101,240 Americans mailed in "WIN" pledges. In hindsight, this was viewed as simply a public relations gimmick which had no way of solving the underlying problems. The main point of that speech was to introduce to Congress a one-year, five-percent income tax increase on corporations and wealthy individuals. This plan would also take $4.4 billion out of the budget, bringing federal spending below $300 billion. At the time, inflation was over twelve percent.

==== Budget ====
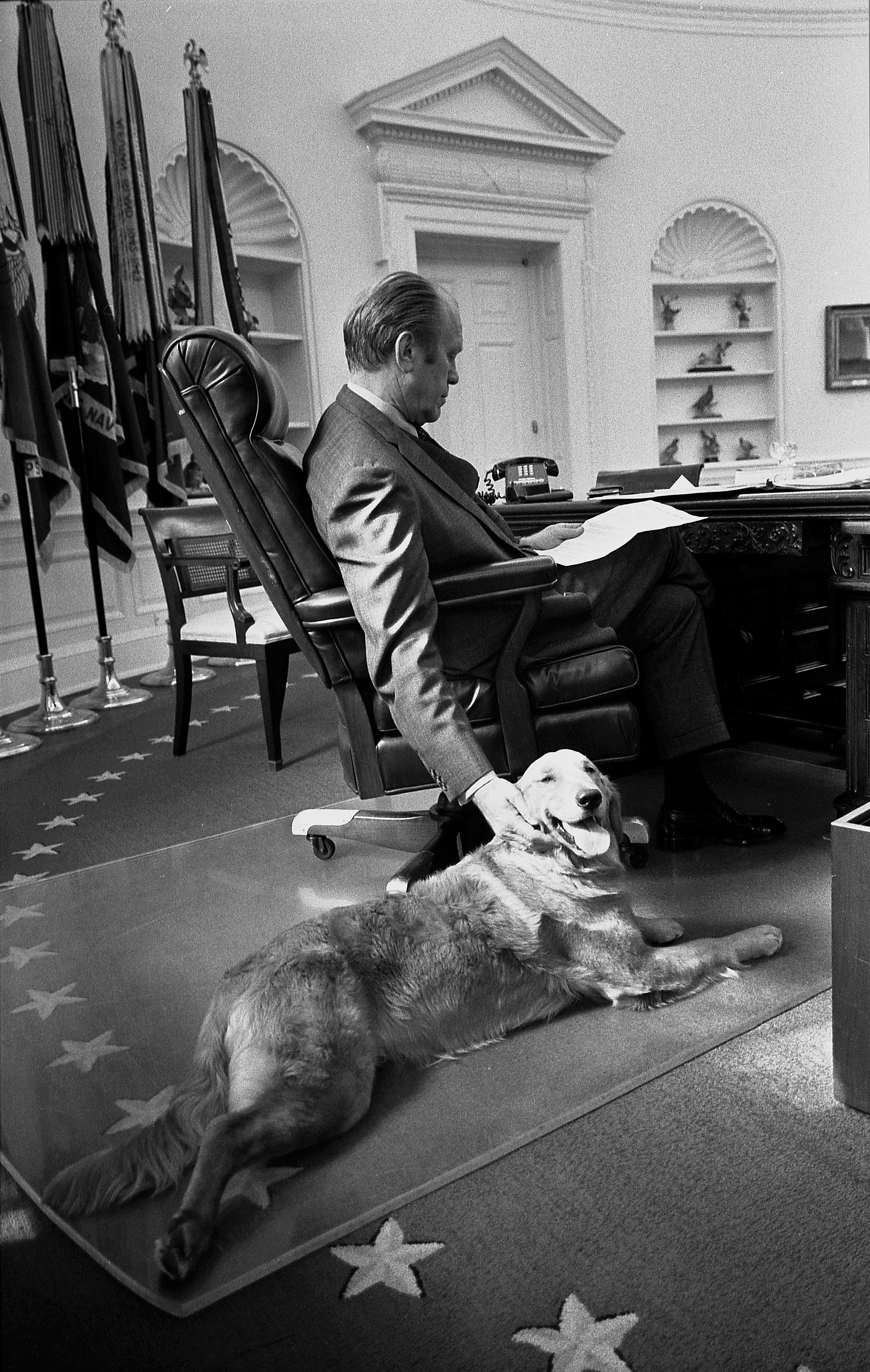
Ford and his Golden Retriever, Liberty, in the Oval Office in 1974

The federal budget ran a deficit every year Ford was president. Despite his reservations about how the program ultimately would be funded in an era of tight public budgeting, Ford signed the Education for All Handicapped Children Act of 1975, which established special education throughout the United States. Ford expressed "strong support for full educational opportunities for our handicapped children" according to the official White House press release for the bill signing.

The economic focus began to change as the country sank into the worst recession since the Great Depression four decades earlier. The focus of the Ford administration turned to stopping the rise in unemployment, which reached nine percent in May 1975. In January 1975, Ford proposed a 1-year tax reduction of $16 billion to stimulate economic growth, along with spending cuts to avoid inflation. Ford was criticized for abruptly switching from advocating a tax increase to a tax reduction. In Congress, the proposed amount of the tax reduction increased to $22.8 billion in tax cuts and lacked spending cuts. In March 1975, Congress passed, and Ford signed into law, these income tax rebates as part of the Tax Reduction Act of 1975. This resulted in a federal deficit of around $53 billion for the 1975 fiscal year and $73.7 billion for 1976.

When New York City faced bankruptcy in 1975, Mayor Abraham Beame was unsuccessful in obtaining Ford's support for a federal bailout. The incident prompted the New York Daily News' famous headline "Ford to City: Drop Dead", referring to a speech in which "Ford declared flatly ... that he would veto any bill calling for 'a federal bail-out of New York City'".

==== Swine flu ====
Ford was confronted with a potential swine flu pandemic. In the early 1970s, an influenza strain H1N1 shifted from a form of flu that affected primarily pigs and crossed over to humans. On February 5, 1976, an army recruit at Fort Dix mysteriously died and four fellow soldiers were hospitalized; health officials announced that "swine flu" was the cause. Soon after, public health officials in the Ford administration urged that every person in the United States be vaccinated. Although the vaccination program was plagued by delays and public relations problems, some 25% of the population was vaccinated by the time the program was canceled in December 1976. Ford and his family were publicly vaccinated before cameras in October, shortly before he lost the presidential election to Jimmy Carter.

==== Equal rights and abortion ====
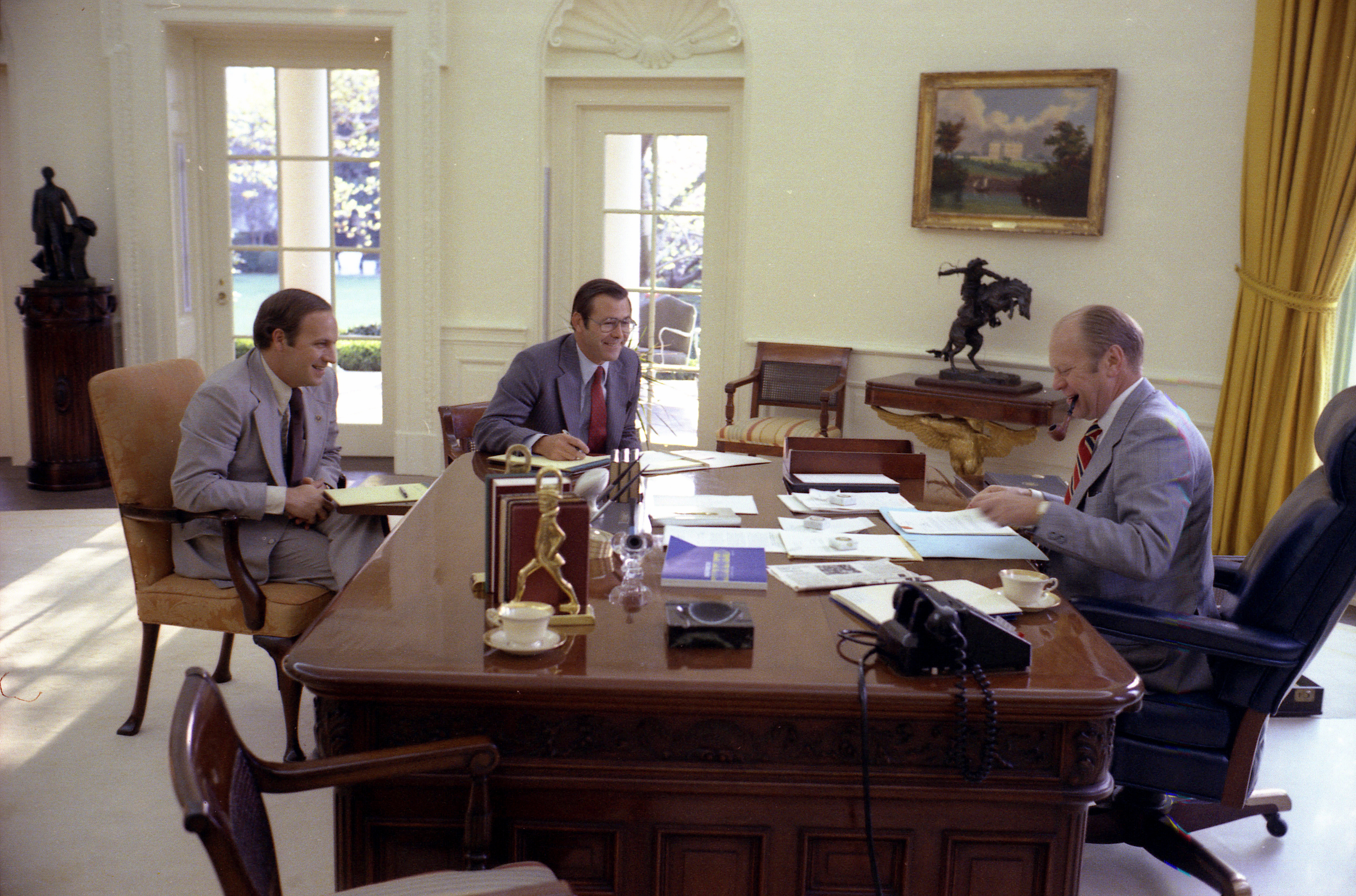
Cheney, Rumsfeld and Ford in the Oval Office, 1975

Ford was an outspoken supporter of the Equal Rights Amendment, issuing Presidential Proclamation no. 4383 in 1975:

In this Land of the Free, it is right, and by nature it ought to be, that all men and all women are equal before the law. Now, therefore, I, Gerald R. Ford, President of the United States of America, to remind all Americans that it is fitting and just to ratify the Equal Rights Amendment adopted by the Congress of the United States of America, in order to secure legal equality for all women and men, do hereby designate and proclaim August 26, 1975, as Women's Equality Day.

As president, Ford's position on abortion was that he supported "a federal constitutional amendment that would permit each one of the 50 States to make the choice". This had also been his position as House Minority Leader in response to the 1973 Supreme Court case of Roe v. Wade, which he opposed. Ford came under criticism when First Lady Betty Ford entered the debate over abortion during an August 1975 interview for 60 Minutes, in which she stated that Roe v. Wade was a "great, great decision". During his later life, Ford would identify as pro-choice.

=== Foreign policy ===
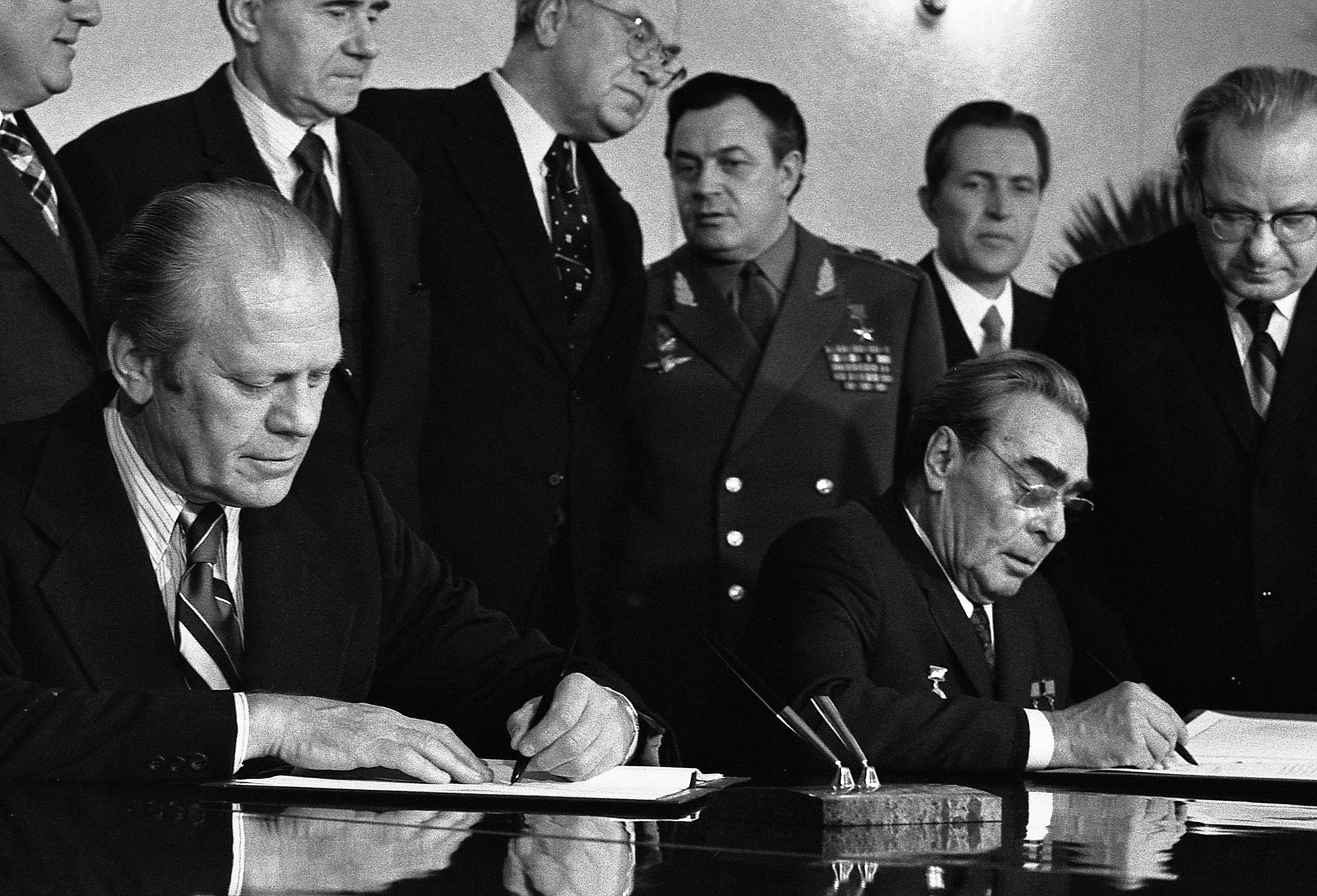
Ford meeting with Soviet leader Leonid Brezhnev to sign a joint communiqué on the SALT treaty during the Vladivostok Summit, November 1974.

Ford continued the détente policy with both the Soviet Union and China, easing the tensions of the Cold War. Still in place from the Nixon administration was the Strategic Arms Limitation Treaty (SALT). The thawing relationship brought about by Nixon's visit to China was reinforced by Ford's own visit in December 1975. The Administration entered into the Helsinki Accords with the Soviet Union in 1975, creating the framework of the Helsinki Watch, an independent non-governmental organization created to monitor compliance which later evolved into Human Rights Watch.

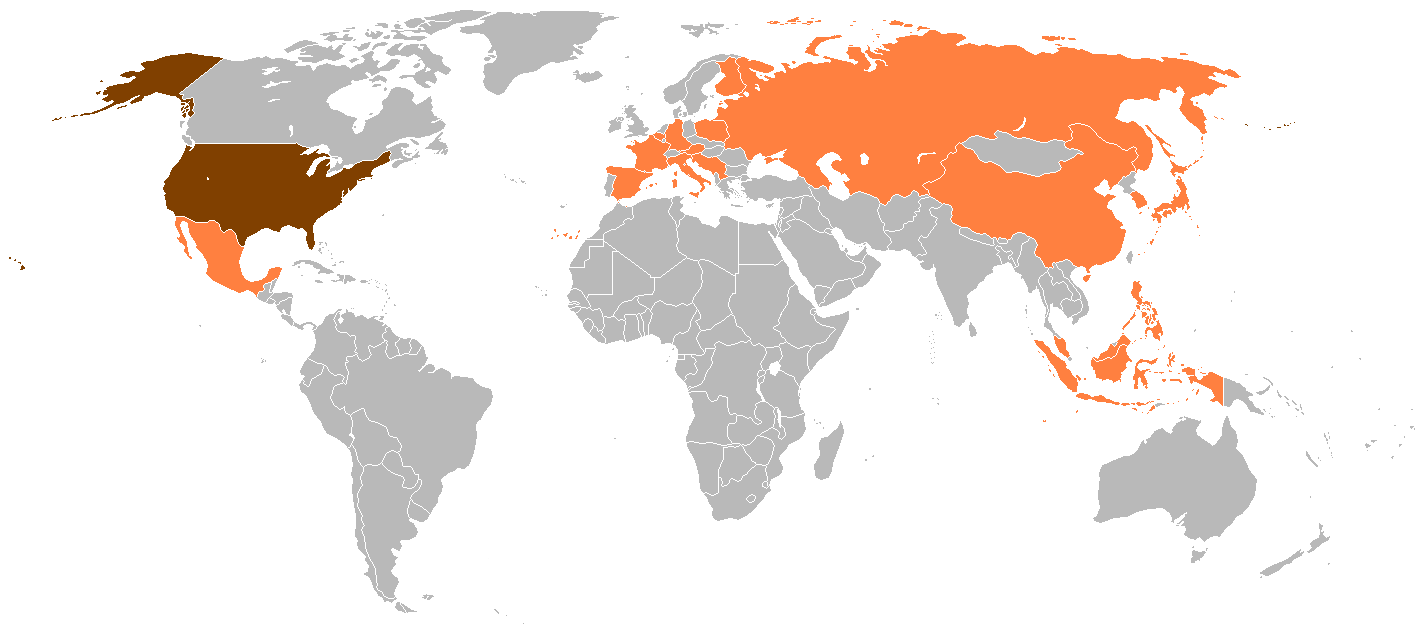
Countries visited by Ford during his presidency

Ford attended the inaugural meeting of the Group of Seven (G7) industrialized nations (initially the G5) in 1975 and secured membership for Canada. Ford supported international solutions to issues. "We live in an interdependent world and, therefore, must work together to resolve common economic problems," he said in a 1974 speech.

In November 1975, Ford adopted the global human population control recommendations of National Security Study Memorandum 200 – a national security directive initially commissioned by Nixon – as United States policy in the subsequent NSDM 314. The plan explicitly states the goal was population control and not improving the lives of individuals despite instructing organizers to "emphasize development and improvements in the quality of life of the poor", later explaining the projects were "primarily for other reasons". Upon approving the plan, Ford stated "United States leadership is essential to combat population growth, to implement the World Population Plan of Action and to advance United States security and overseas interests". Population control policies were adopted to protect American economic and military interests, with the memorandum arguing that population growth in developing countries resulted with such nations gaining global political power, that more citizens posed a risk to accessing foreign natural resources while also making American businesses vulnerable to governments seeking to fund a growing population, and that younger generations born would be prone to anti-establishment behavior, increasing political instability.

==== Indonesia and East Timor ====
As South Vietnam collapsed, an anti-communist Indonesia was seen as essential to Cold War strategy by the United States. Good relations with the Indonesian government were considered more important than the decolonization process in East Timor. The Ford administration gave the Suharto regime in Indonesia economic and military support, even as it invaded East Timor and committed a genocide that killed close to a third of the population. One day prior to the invasion, Ford and Kissinger met with Suharto, and they assured him that relations with Indonesia would remain strong regardless of Indonesia's actions and that it would not object to the annexation of East Timor.

==== Middle East ====
In the Middle East and eastern Mediterranean, two ongoing international disputes developed into crises. The Cyprus dispute turned into a crisis with the Turkish invasion of Cyprus in July 1974, causing extreme strain within the North Atlantic Treaty Organization (NATO) alliance. In mid-August, the Greek government withdrew Greece from the NATO military structure; in mid-September, the Senate and House of Representatives overwhelmingly voted to halt military aid to Turkey. Ford, concerned with both the effect of this on Turkish-American relations and the deterioration of security on NATO's eastern front, vetoed the bill. A second bill was then passed by Congress, which Ford also vetoed, fearing that it might impede negotiations in Cyprus, although a compromise was accepted to continue aid until December 10, 1974, provided Turkey would not send American supplies to Cyprus. U.S. military aid to Turkey was suspended on February 5, 1975.

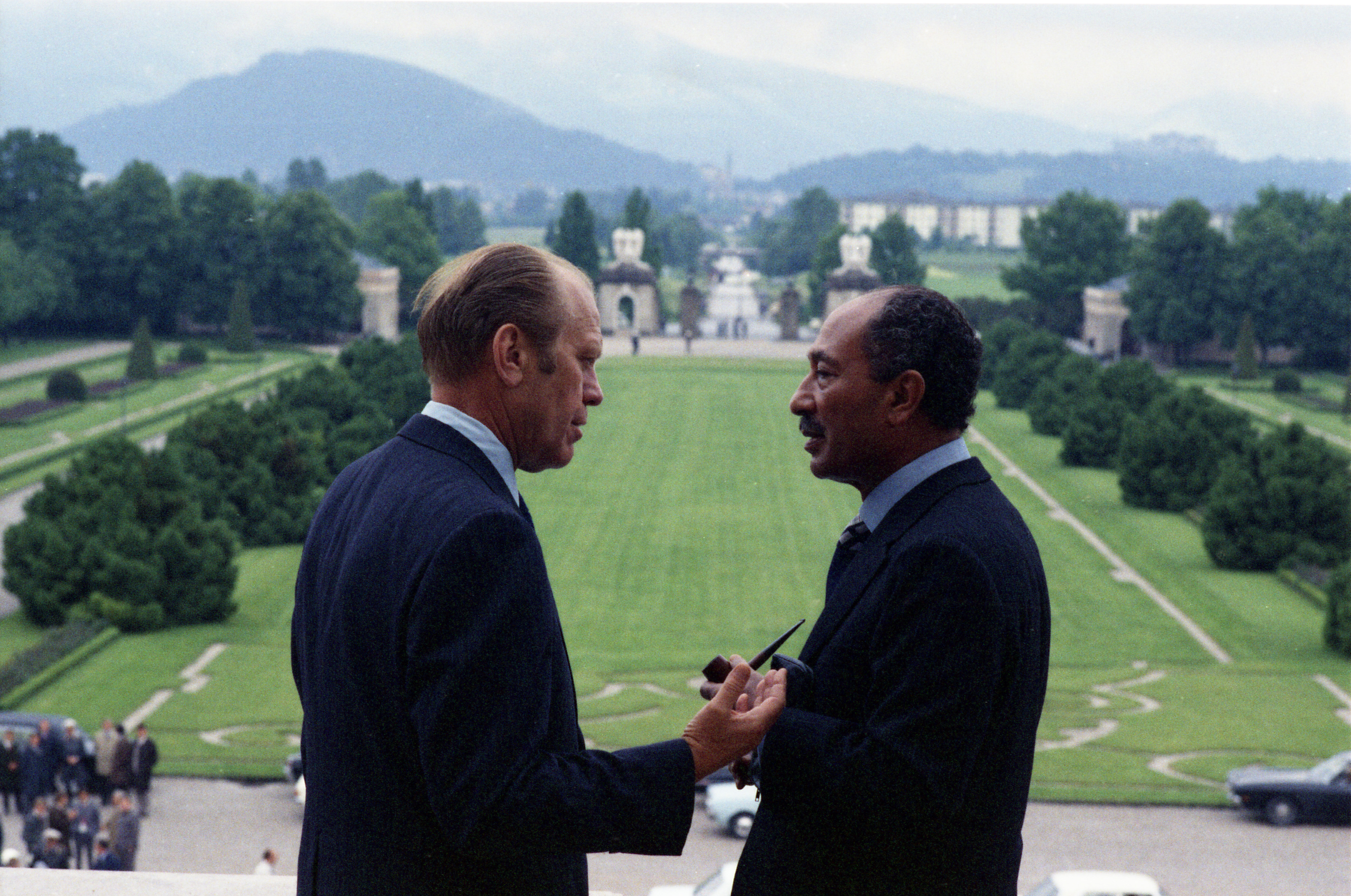
Ford with Egyptian president Anwar Sadat in Salzburg, 1975

In the continuing Arab–Israeli conflict, although the initial cease fire had been implemented to end active conflict in the Yom Kippur War, Kissinger's continuing shuttle diplomacy was showing little progress. Ford considered it "stalling" and wrote, "Their [Israeli] tactics frustrated the Egyptians and made me mad as hell." During Kissinger's shuttle to Israel in early March 1975, a last minute reversal to consider further withdrawal, prompted a cable from Ford to Prime Minister Yitzhak Rabin, which included:

I wish to express my profound disappointment over Israel's attitude in the course of the negotiations ... Failure of the negotiation will have a far reaching impact on the region and on our relations. I have given instructions for a reassessment of United States policy in the region, including our relations with Israel, with the aim of ensuring that overall American interests ... are protected. You will be notified of our decision.

On March 24, Ford informed congressional leaders of both parties of the reassessment of the administration's policies in the Middle East. In practical terms, "reassessment" meant canceling or suspending further aid to Israel. For six months between March and September 1975, the United States refused to conclude any new arms agreements with Israel. Rabin notes it was "an innocent-sounding term that heralded one of the worst periods in American-Israeli relations". The announced reassessments upset the American Jewish community and Israel's well-wishers in Congress. On May 21, Ford "experienced a real shock" when seventy-six U.S. senators wrote him a letter urging him to be "responsive" to Israel's request for $2.59 billion (equivalent to $15.5 billion in 2025) in military and economic aid. Ford felt truly annoyed and thought the chance for peace was jeopardized. It was, since the September 1974 ban on arms sales to Turkey, the second major congressional intrusion upon the President's foreign policy prerogatives. The following summer months were described by Ford as an American-Israeli "war of nerves" or "test of wills". After much bargaining, the Sinai Interim Agreement (Sinai II) was formally signed on September 1, and aid resumed.

==== Vietnam ====
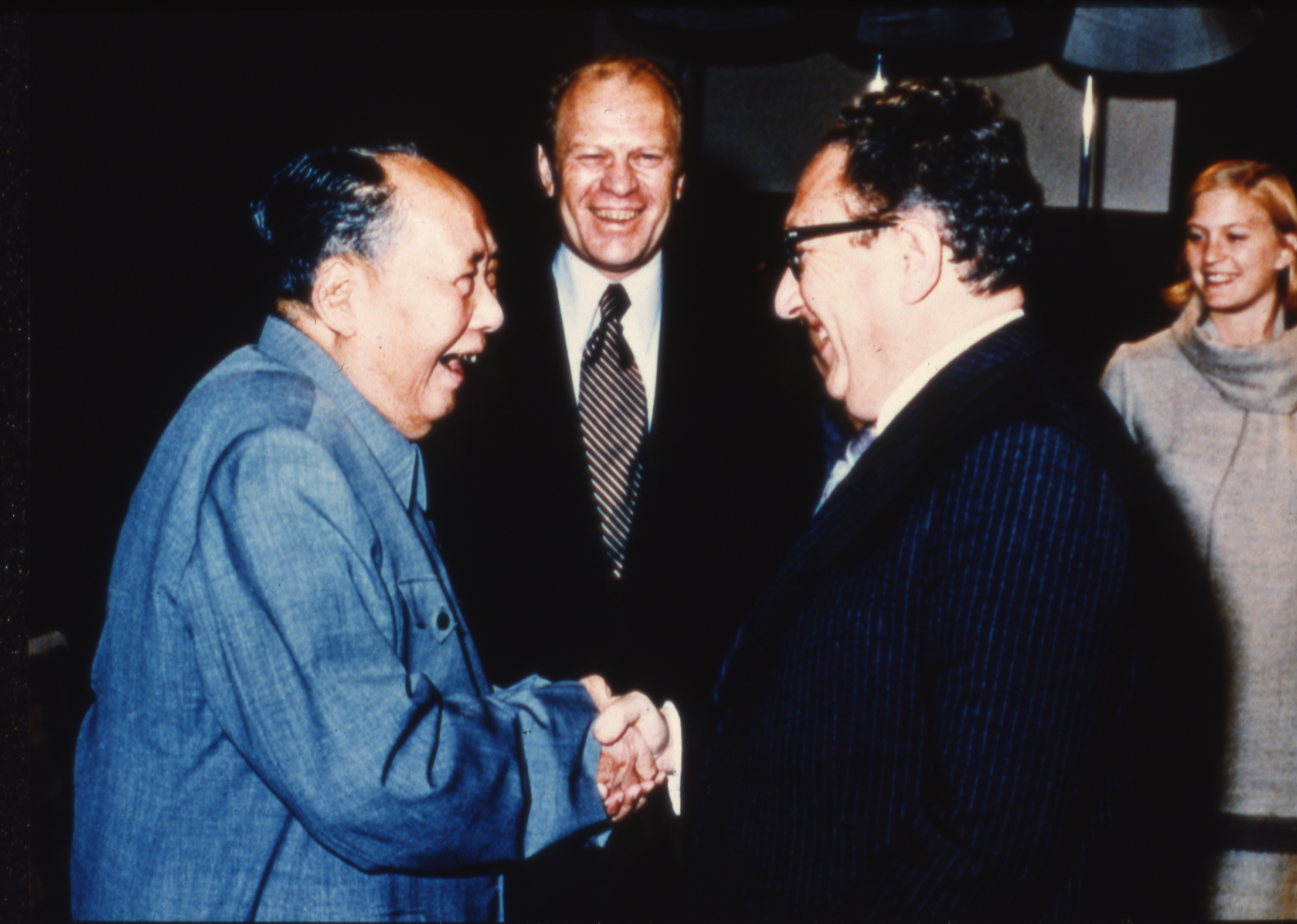
Ford and his daughter Susan Ford watching as Henry Kissinger (right) shakes hands with Mao Zedong, December 2, 1975.

One of Ford's greatest challenges was dealing with the continuing Vietnam War. American offensive operations against North Vietnam had ended with the Paris Peace Accords, signed on January 27, 1973. The accords declared a cease-fire across both North and South Vietnam, and required the release of American prisoners of war. The agreement guaranteed the territorial integrity of Vietnam and, like the Geneva Conference of 1954, called for national elections in the North and South. The Paris Peace Accords stipulated a sixty-day period for the total withdrawal of U.S. forces.

The agreements were negotiated by US National Security Advisor Henry Kissinger and North Vietnamese Politburo member Lê Đức Thọ. South Vietnamese President Nguyen Van Thieu was not involved in the final negotiations, and publicly criticized the proposed agreement. However, anti-war pressures within the United States forced Nixon and Kissinger to pressure Thieu to sign the agreement and enable the withdrawal of American forces. In multiple letters to the South Vietnamese president, Nixon had promised that the United States would defend Thieu's government, should the North Vietnamese violate the accords.

In December 1974, months after Ford took office, North Vietnamese forces invaded the province of Phuoc Long. General Trần Văn Trà sought to gauge any South Vietnamese or American response to the invasion, as well as to solve logistical issues, before proceeding with the invasion.

As North Vietnamese forces advanced, Ford requested Congress approve a $722 million aid package for South Vietnam (equivalent to $4.32 billion in 2025), funds that had been promised by the Nixon administration. Congress voted against the proposal by a wide margin. Senator Jacob K. Javits offered "...large sums for evacuation, but not one nickel for military aid". President Thieu resigned on April 21, 1975, publicly blaming the lack of support from the United States for the fall of his country. Two days later, on April 23, Ford gave a speech at Tulane University. In that speech, he announced that the Vietnam War was over "...as far as America is concerned". The announcement was met with thunderous applause.

1,373 U.S. citizens and 5,595 Vietnamese and third-country nationals were evacuated from the South Vietnamese capital of Saigon during Operation Frequent Wind. Many of the Vietnamese evacuees were allowed to enter the United States under the Indochina Migration and Refugee Assistance Act. The 1975 Act appropriated $455 million (equivalent to $2.72 billion in 2025) toward the costs of assisting the settlement of Indochinese refugees. In all, 130,000 Vietnamese refugees came to the United States in 1975. Thousands more escaped in the years that followed.

==== Mayaguez incident ====
North Vietnam's victory over the South led to a considerable shift in the political winds in Asia, and Ford administration officials worried about a consequent loss of U.S. influence there. The administration proved it was willing to respond forcefully to challenges to its interests in the region when Khmer Rouge forces seized an American ship in international waters. The main crisis was the Mayaguez incident. In May 1975, shortly after the fall of Saigon and the Khmer Rouge conquest of Cambodia, Cambodians seized the American merchant ship Mayaguez in international waters. Ford dispatched Marines to rescue the crew, but the Marines landed on the wrong island and met unexpectedly stiff resistance just as, unknown to the U.S., the Mayaguez sailors were being released. In the operation, two military transport helicopters carrying the Marines for the assault operation were shot down, and 41 U.S. servicemen were killed and 50 wounded, while approximately 60 Khmer Rouge soldiers were killed. Despite the American losses, the operation was seen as a success in the United States, and Ford enjoyed an 11-point boost in his approval ratings in the aftermath. The Americans killed during the operation became the last to have their names inscribed on the Vietnam Veterans Memorial wall in Washington, D.C.

Some historians have argued that the Ford administration felt the need to respond forcefully to the incident because it was construed as a Soviet plot. Work by Andrew Gawthorpe, published in 2009, based on an analysis of the administration's internal discussions, shows that Ford's national security team understood that the seizure of the vessel was a local, and perhaps even accidental, provocation by an immature Khmer government. Nevertheless, they felt the need to respond forcefully to discourage further provocations by other Communist countries in Asia.

=== Assassination attempts ===
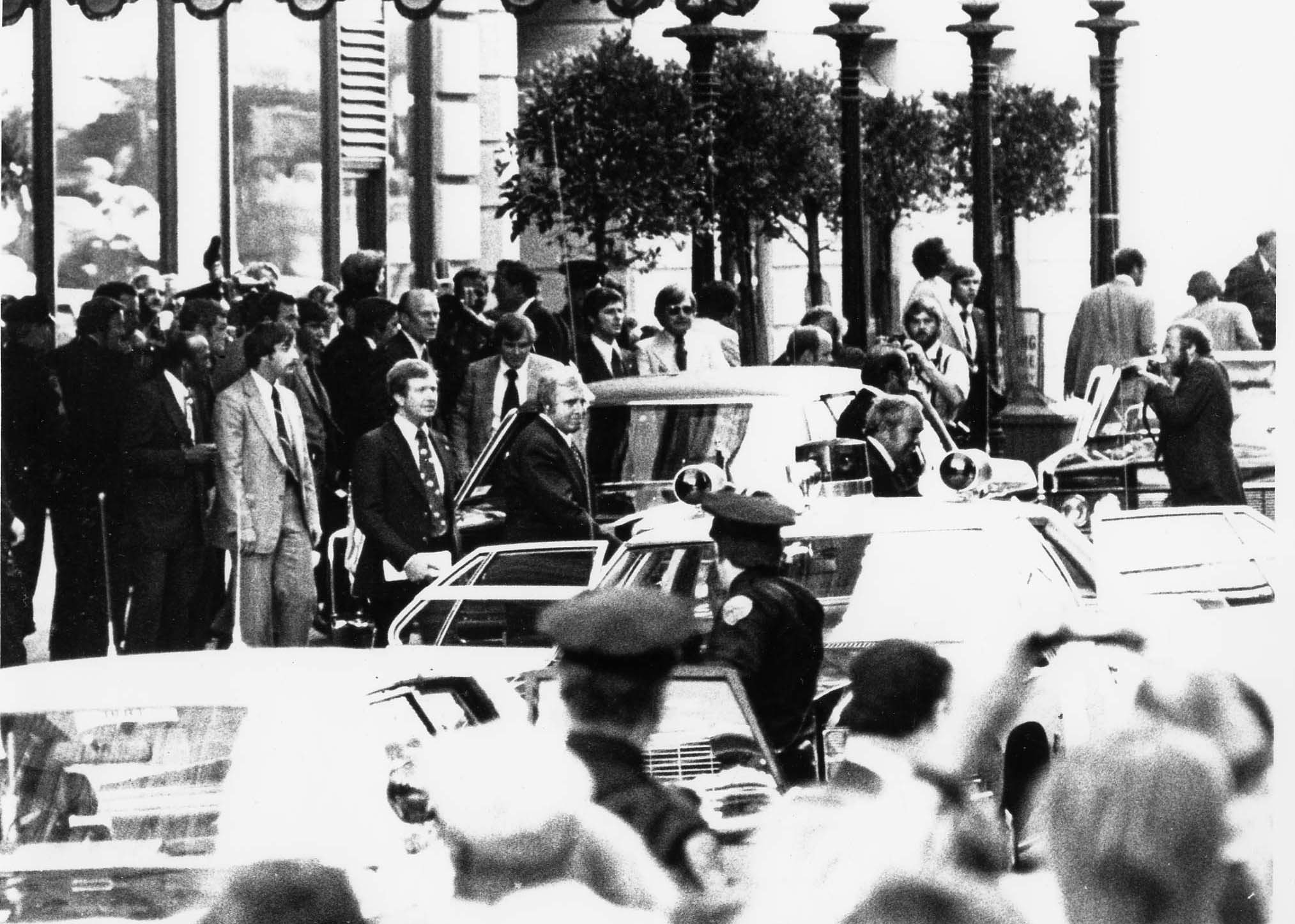
Ford exiting the St. Francis Hotel in San Francisco seconds before Sara Jane Moore attempted to shoot him.

Ford was the target of two assassination attempts during his presidency. In Sacramento, California, on September 5, 1975, Lynette "Squeaky" Fromme, a follower of Charles Manson, pointed a Colt .45-caliber handgun at Ford and pulled the trigger at point-blank range. As she did, Larry Buendorf, a Secret Service agent, grabbed the gun, and Fromme was taken into custody. She was later convicted of attempted assassination of the President and was sentenced to life in prison; she was paroled on August 14, 2009, after serving 34 years.

In reaction to this attempt, the Secret Service began keeping Ford at a more secure distance from anonymous crowds. On September 22, 1975, as he left the St. Francis Hotel in downtown San Francisco, Sara Jane Moore fired a .38-caliber revolver at him from across the street. The shot missed Ford by a few feet. Retired Marine Oliver Sipple grabbed at her gun and deflected the second shot; the bullet struck a wall about six inches above and to the right of Ford's head, then ricocheted and hit a taxi driver, who was slightly wounded. Moore was later sentenced to life in prison. She was paroled on December 31, 2007, after serving 32 years.

=== Judicial appointments ===
==== Supreme Court ====
In 1975, Ford appointed John Paul Stevens as Associate Justice of the Supreme Court of the United States to replace retiring Justice William O. Douglas. Stevens had been a judge of the United States Court of Appeals for the Seventh Circuit, appointed by President Nixon. During his tenure as House Republican leader, Ford had led efforts to have Douglas impeached. After being confirmed, Stevens eventually disappointed some conservatives by siding with the Court's liberal wing regarding the outcome of many key issues. Nevertheless, in 2005 Ford praised Stevens. "He has served his nation well," Ford said of Stevens, "with dignity, intellect and without partisan political concerns."

==== Other judicial appointments ====
Ford appointed 11 judges to the United States Courts of Appeals, and 50 judges to the United States district courts.

=== 1976 presidential campaign ===
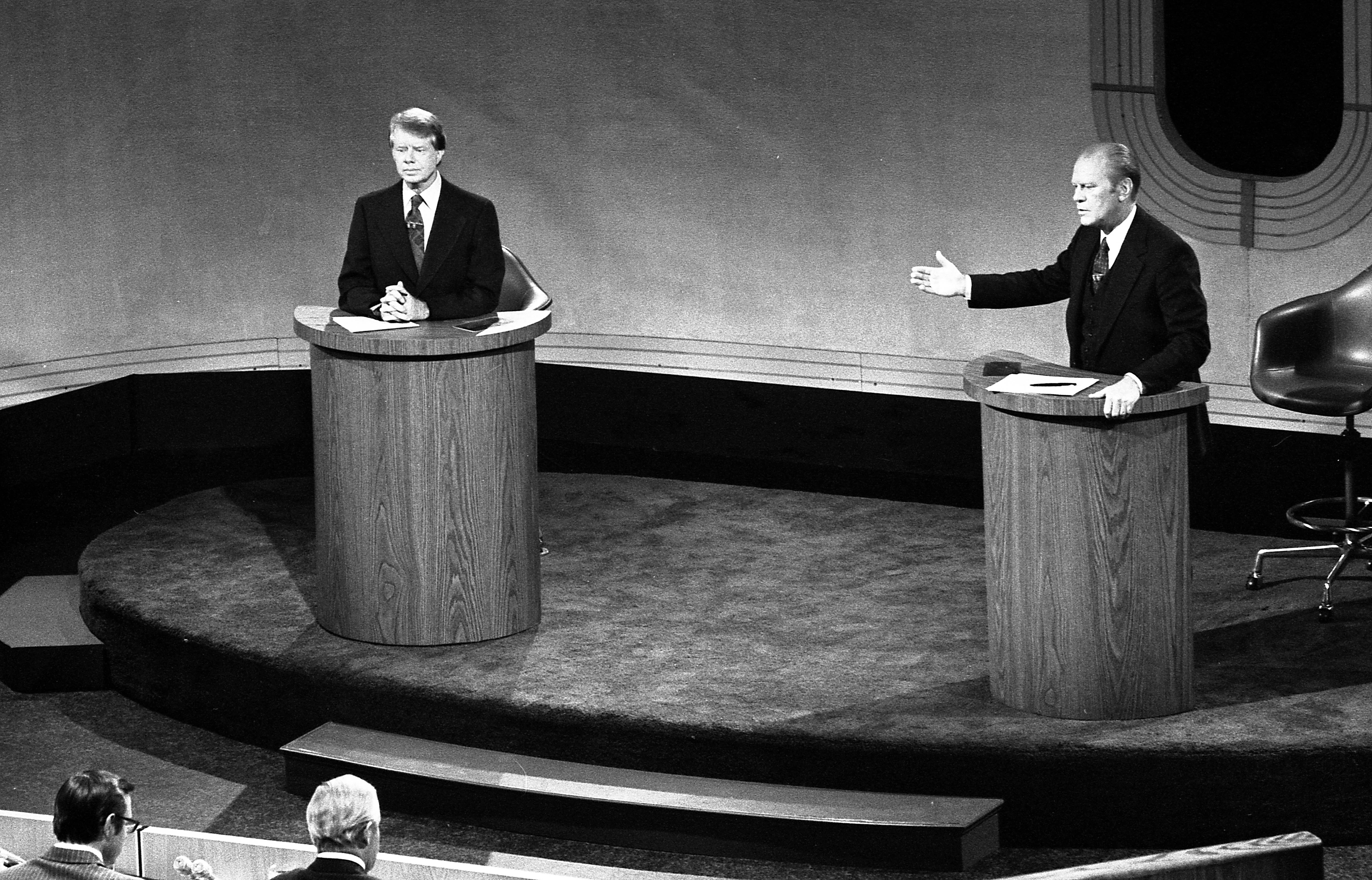
Jimmy Carter and Ford in a presidential debate on September 23, 1976

Ford reluctantly agreed to run for office in 1976, but first he had to counter a challenge for the Republican party nomination. Former Governor of California Ronald Reagan and the party's conservative wing faulted Ford for failing to do more in South Vietnam, for signing the Helsinki Accords, and for negotiating to cede the Panama Canal. (Negotiations for the canal continued under President Carter, who eventually signed the Torrijos–Carter Treaties.) Reagan launched his campaign in autumn of 1975 and won numerous primaries, including North Carolina, Texas, Indiana, and California, but failed to get a majority of delegates; Reagan withdrew from the race at the Republican Convention in Kansas City, Missouri. The conservative insurgency did lead to Ford dropping the more liberal Vice President Nelson Rockefeller in favor of U.S. senator Bob Dole of Kansas.

In addition to the pardon dispute and lingering anti-Republican sentiment, Ford had to counter a plethora of negative media imagery. Chevy Chase often did pratfalls on Saturday Night Live, imitating Ford, who had been seen stumbling on two occasions during his term. As Chase commented, "He even mentioned in his own autobiography it had an effect over a period of time that affected the election to some degree."

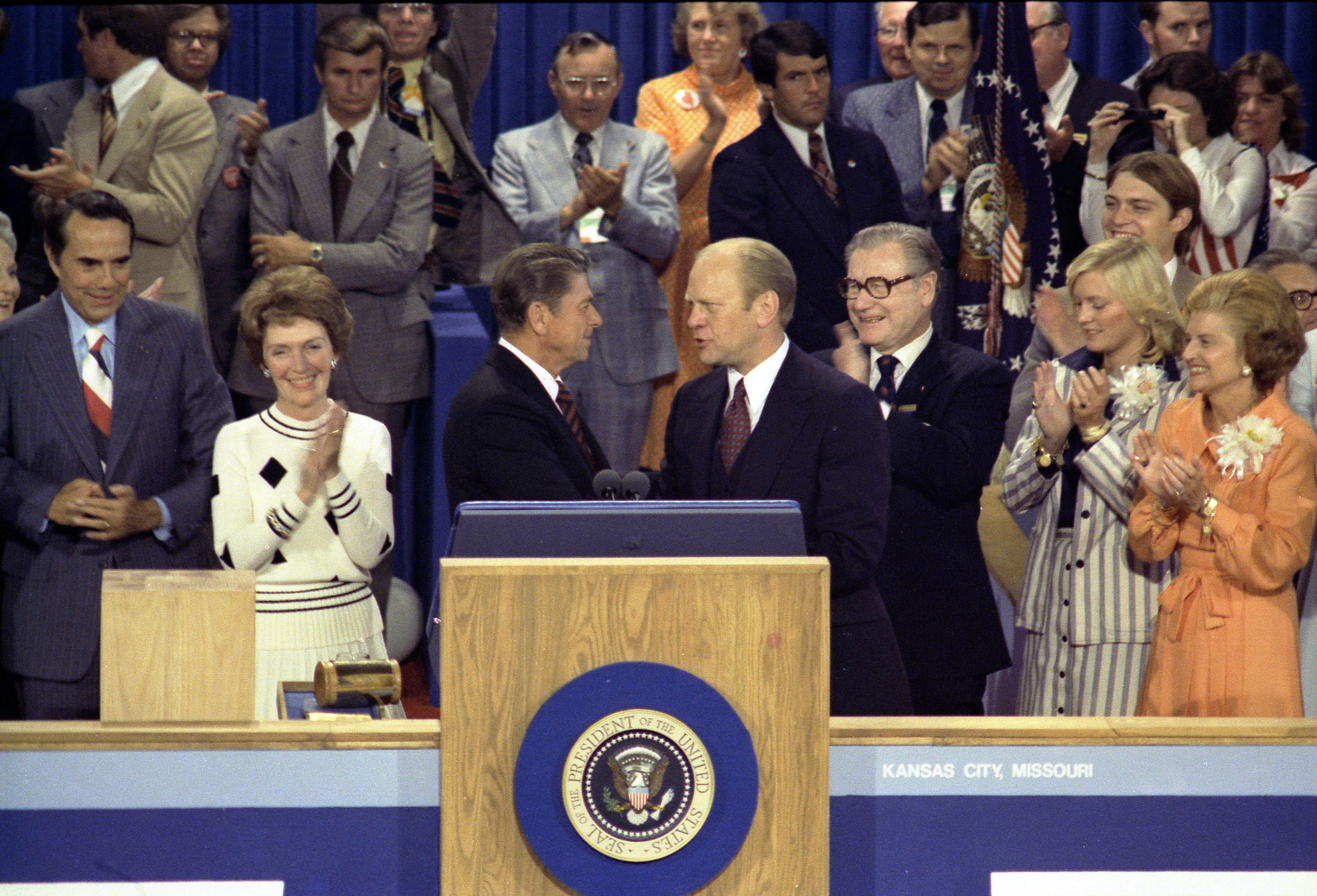
Ronald Reagan congratulating President Ford after the president wins the 1976 Republican nomination, while Bob Dole, Nancy Reagan, and Vice President Nelson Rockefeller look on.

Ford's 1976 election campaign benefitted from his being an incumbent president during several anniversary events held during the period leading up to the United States Bicentennial. The Washington, D.C. fireworks display on the Fourth of July was presided over by the President and televised nationally. On July 7, 1976, the President and First Lady served as hosts at a White House state dinner for Queen Elizabeth II and Prince Philip of the United Kingdom, which was televised on the Public Broadcasting Service network. The 200th anniversary of the Battles of Lexington and Concord in Massachusetts gave Ford the opportunity to deliver a speech to 110,000 in Concord acknowledging the need for a strong national defense tempered with a plea for "reconciliation, not recrimination" and "reconstruction, not rancor" between the United States and those who would pose "threats to peace". Speaking in New Hampshire on the previous day, Ford condemned the growing trend toward big government bureaucracy and argued for a return to "basic American virtues".

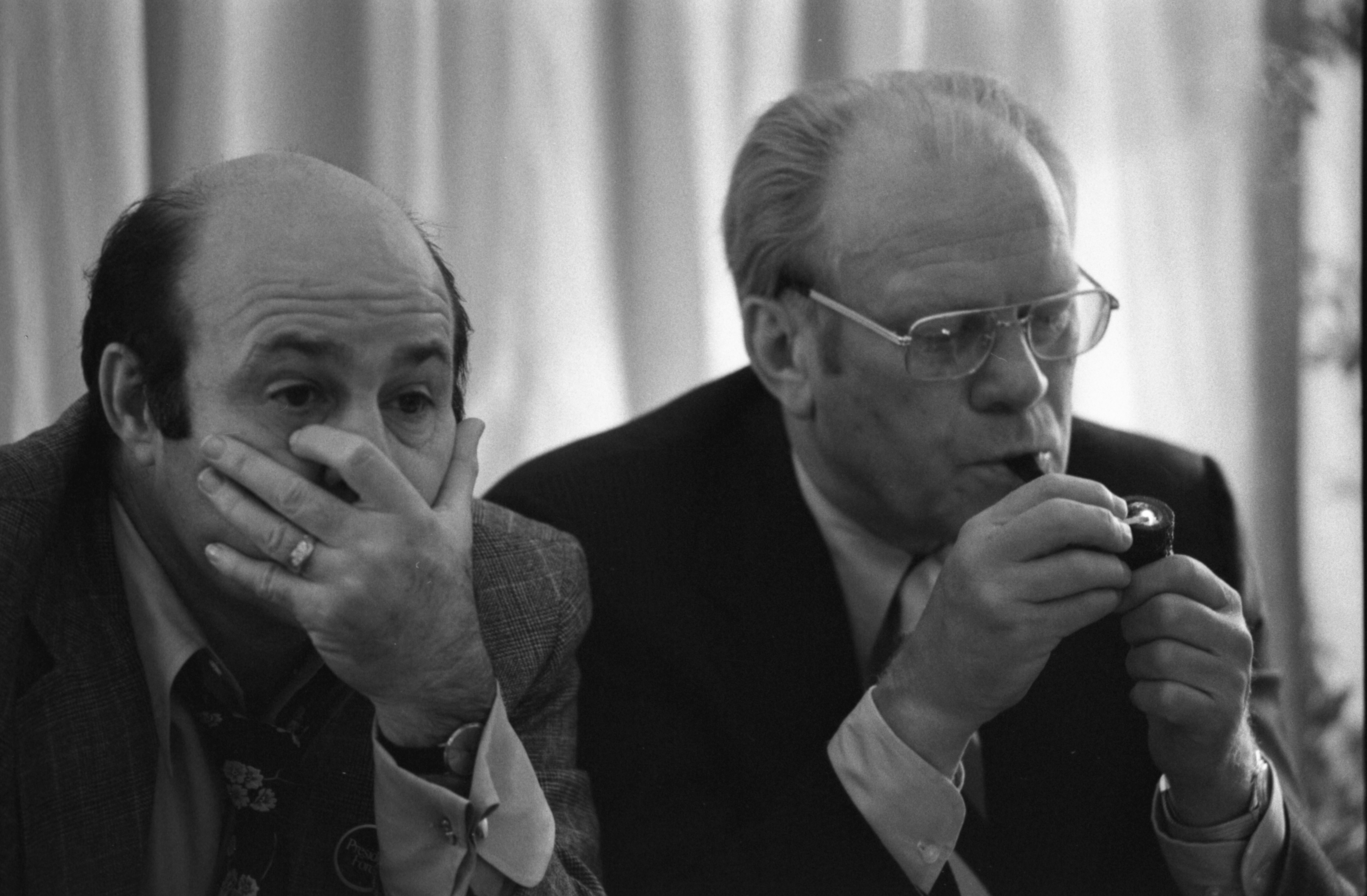
Ford watching election returns with Joe Garagiola on election night, reacting to television reports that Ford had just been projected as having lost Texas to Carter

Televised presidential debates were reintroduced for the first time since the 1960 election. As such, Ford became the first incumbent president to participate in one. Carter later attributed his victory in the election to the debates, saying they "gave the viewers reason to think that Jimmy Carter had something to offer". The turning point came in the second debate when Ford blundered by stating, "There is no Soviet domination of Eastern Europe and there never will be under a Ford Administration." Ford also said that he did not "believe that the Poles consider themselves dominated by the Soviet Union". In an interview years later, Ford said he had intended to imply that the Soviets would never crush the spirits of eastern Europeans seeking independence. However, the phrasing was so awkward that questioner Max Frankel was visibly incredulous at the response.

In the end, Carter won the election, receiving 50.1% of the popular vote and 297 electoral votes compared with 48.0% and 240 electoral votes for Ford.

== Post-presidency (1977–2006) ==
The Nixon pardon controversy eventually subsided. Ford's successor, Jimmy Carter, opened his 1977 inaugural address by praising the outgoing president, saying, "For myself and for our Nation, I want to thank my predecessor for all he has done to heal our land."

After leaving the White House, the Fords moved to Denver, Colorado. Ford successfully invested in oil with Marvin Davis, which later provided an income for Ford's children.

He continued to make appearances at events of historical and ceremonial significance to the nation, such as presidential inaugurals and memorial services. In January 1977, he became the president of Eisenhower Fellowships in Philadelphia, then served as the chairman of its board of trustees from 1980 to 1986. Later in 1977, he reluctantly agreed to be interviewed by James M. Naughton, a New York Times journalist who was given the assignment to write the former president's advance obituary, an article that would be updated prior to its eventual publication. In 1979, Ford published his autobiography, A Time to Heal (Harper/Reader's Digest, 454 pages). A review in Foreign Affairs described it as, "Serene, unruffled, unpretentious, like the author. This is the shortest and most honest of recent presidential memoirs, but there are no surprises, no deep probings of motives or events. No more here than meets the eye."

During the term of office of his successor, Jimmy Carter, Ford received monthly briefs by President Carter's senior staff on international and domestic issues, and was always invited to lunch at the White House whenever he was in Washington, D.C. Their close friendship developed after Carter had left office, with the catalyst being their trip together to the funeral of Anwar el-Sadat in 1981. Until Ford's death, Carter and his wife, Rosalynn, visited the Fords' home frequently. Ford and Carter served as honorary co-chairs of the National Commission on Federal Election Reform in 2001 and of the Continuity of Government Commission in 2002.

Like Presidents Carter, George H. W. Bush, and Bill Clinton, Ford was an honorary co-chair of the Council for Excellence in Government, a group dedicated to excellence in government performance, which provides leadership training to top federal employees. He also devoted much time to his love of golf, often playing both privately and in public events with comedian Bob Hope, a longtime friend. In 1977, he shot a hole in one during a Pro-am held in conjunction with the Danny Thomas Memphis Classic at Colonial Country Club in Memphis, Tennessee.

In 1977, Ford established the Gerald R. Ford Institute of Public Policy at Albion College in Albion, Michigan, to give undergraduates training in public policy. In April 1981, he opened the Gerald R. Ford Library in Ann Arbor, Michigan, on the north campus of his alma mater, the University of Michigan, followed in September by the Gerald R. Ford Museum in Grand Rapids.

Ford considered a run for the Republican nomination in 1980, forgoing numerous opportunities to serve on corporate boards to keep his options open for a rematch with Carter. Ford attacked Carter's conduct of the SALT II negotiations and foreign policy in the Middle East and Africa. Many have argued that Ford also wanted to exorcise his image as an "accidental president" and to win a term in his own right. Ford also believed the more conservative Ronald Reagan would be unable to defeat Carter and would hand the incumbent a second term. Ford was encouraged by his former secretary of state, Henry Kissinger, as well as governors Jim Rhodes of Ohio and Bill Clements of Texas to enter the race. On March 15, 1980, Ford announced that he would forgo a run for the Republican nomination, vowing to support the eventual nominee.

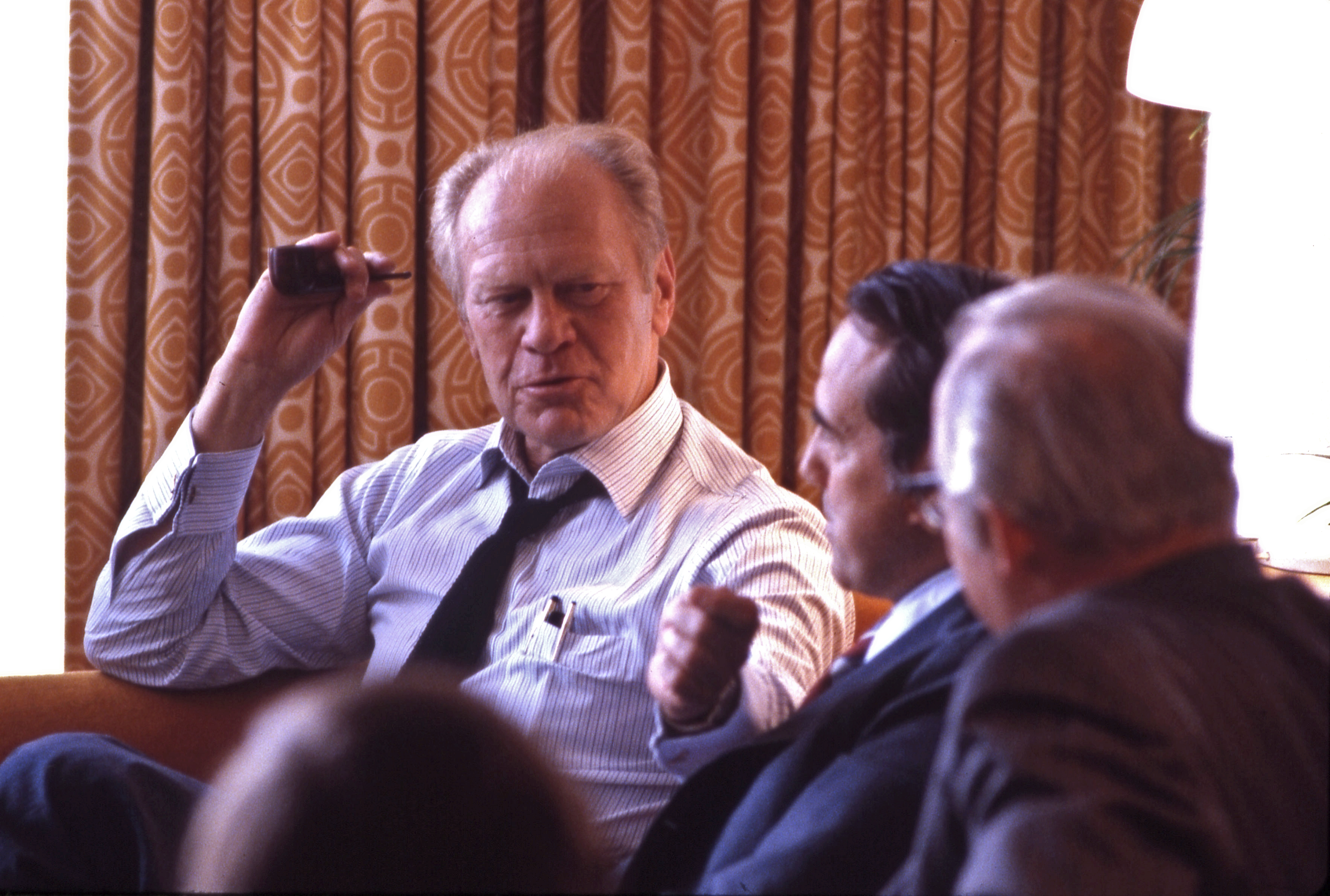
On July 16, 1980 (day 3 of the 1980 Republican National Convention), Ford consulting with Bob Dole, Howard Baker and Bill Brock before ultimately making a decision to decline the offer to serve as Ronald Reagan's running mate.

After securing the Republican nomination in 1980, Ronald Reagan considered his former rival Ford as a potential vice-presidential running mate, but negotiations between the Reagan and Ford camps at the Republican National Convention were unsuccessful. Ford conditioned his acceptance on Reagan's agreement to an unprecedented "co-presidency", giving Ford the power to control key executive branch appointments (such as Kissinger as Secretary of State and Alan Greenspan as Treasury Secretary). After rejecting these terms, Reagan offered the vice-presidential nomination instead to George H. W. Bush. Ford did appear in a campaign commercial for the Reagan-Bush ticket, in which he declared that the country would be "better served by a Reagan presidency rather than a continuation of the weak and politically expedient policies of Jimmy Carter". On October 8, 1980, Ford said former President Nixon's involvement in the general election potentially could negatively impact the Reagan campaign: "I think it would have been much more helpful if Mr. Nixon had stayed in the background during this campaign. It would have been much more beneficial to Ronald Reagan."

On October 3, 1980, Ford cast blame on Carter for the latter's charges of ineffectiveness on the part of the Federal Reserve Board due to his appointing of most of its members: "President Carter, when the going gets tough, will do anything to save his own political skin. This latest action by the president is cowardly."

Following the attempted assassination of Ronald Reagan, Ford told reporters while appearing at a fundraiser for Thomas Kean that criminals who use firearms should get the death penalty in the event someone is injured with the weapon.

In September 1981, Ford advised Reagan against succumbing to Wall Street demands and follow his own agenda for the economic policies of the U.S. during an appearance on Good Morning America: "He shouldn't let the gurus of Wall Street decide what the economic future of this country is going to be. They are wrong in my opinion." During a news conference on October 20, 1981, Ford stated that stopping the Reagan administration's Saudi arms package could have a large negative impact to American relations in the Middle East.

On March 24, 1982, Ford offered an endorsement of Reagan's economic policies while also stating the possibility of Reagan being met with a stalemate by Congress if not willing to compromise while in Washington.

Ford founded the annual AEI World Forum in 1982, and joined the American Enterprise Institute as a distinguished fellow. He was also awarded an honorary doctorate at Central Connecticut State University on March 23, 1988.

During an August 1982 fundraising reception, Ford stated his opposition to a constitutional amendment requiring the U.S. to have a balanced budget, citing a need to elect "members of the House and Senate who will immediately when Congress convenes act more responsibly in fiscal matters." Ford was a participant in the 1982 midterm elections, traveling to Tennessee in October of that year to help Republican candidates.

In January 1984, a letter signed by Ford and Carter and urging world leaders to extend their failed effort to end world hunger was released and sent to Secretary-General of the United Nations Javier Pérez de Cuéllar.

In 1987, Ford testified before the Senate Judiciary Committee in favor of District of Columbia Circuit Court judge and former Solicitor General Robert Bork after Bork was nominated by President Reagan to be an Associate Justice of the United States Supreme Court. Bork's nomination was rejected by a vote of 58–42.

In 1987, Ford's Humor and the Presidency, a book of humorous political anecdotes, was published.

By 1988, Ford was a member of several corporate boards including Commercial Credit, Nova Pharmaceutical, the Pullman Company, Tesoro Petroleum, and Tiger International, Inc. Ford also became an honorary director of Citigroup, a position he held until his death.

In October 1990, Ford appeared in Gettysburg, Pennsylvania with Bob Hope to commemorate the centennial anniversary of the birth of former president Dwight D. Eisenhower, where the two unveiled a plaque with the signatures of each living former president.

In April 1991, Ford joined former presidents Richard Nixon, Ronald Reagan, and Jimmy Carter, in supporting the Brady Bill. Three years later, he wrote to the U.S. House of Representatives, along with Carter and Reagan, in support of the assault weapons ban.

At the 1992 Republican National Convention, Ford compared the election cycle to his 1976 loss to Carter and urged attention be paid to electing a Republican Congress: "If it's change you want on Nov. 3, my friends, the place to start is not at the White House but in the United States' Capitol. Congress, as every school child knows, has the power of the purse. For nearly 40 years, Democratic majorities have held to the time-tested New Deal formula, tax and tax, spend and spend, elect and elect." (The Republicans would later win both Houses of Congress at the 1994 mid-term elections.)

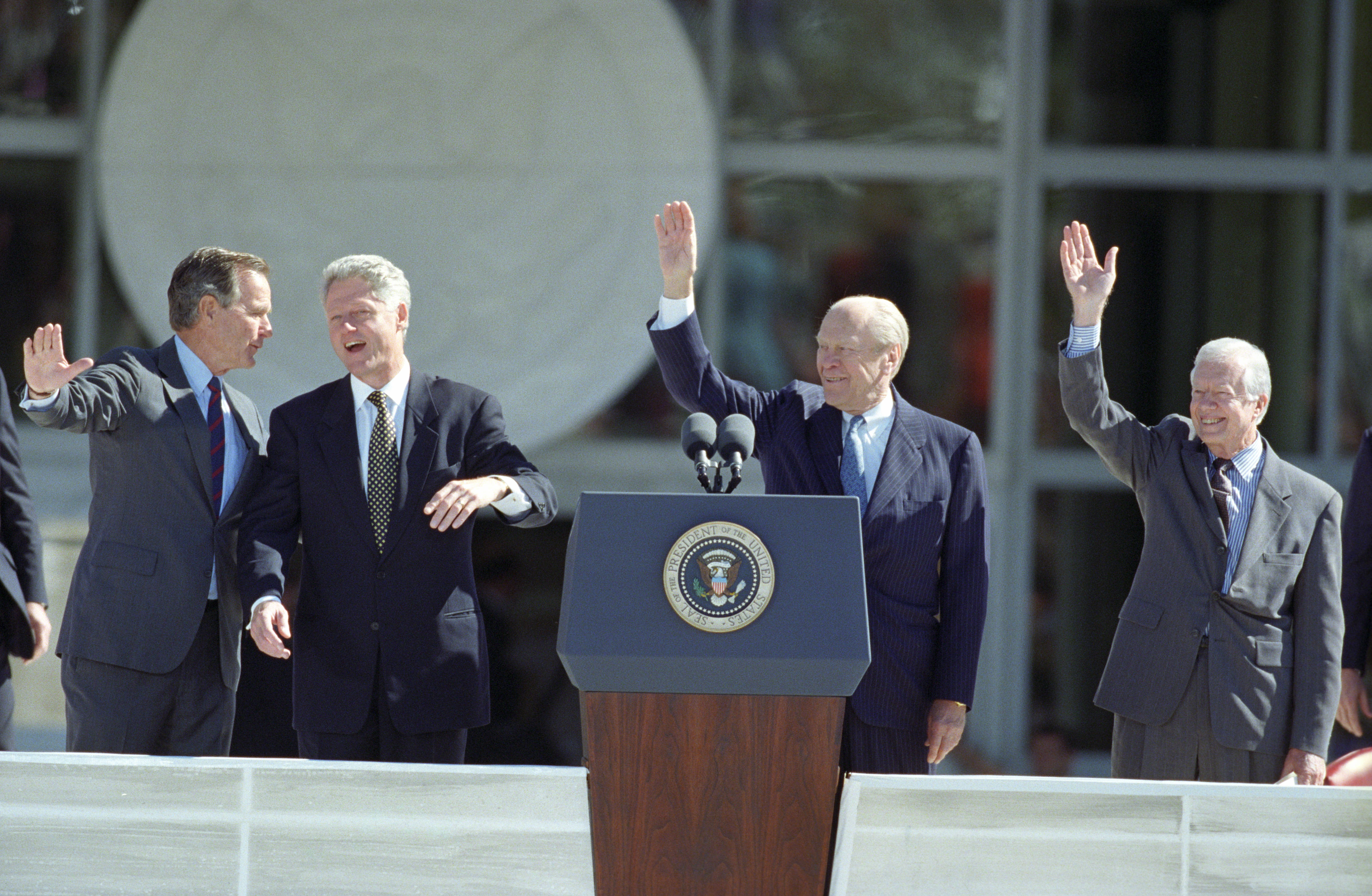
Ford joins President Bill Clinton and former presidents George H. W. Bush and Jimmy Carter onstage at the dedication of the George H.W. Bush Presidential Library and Museum at Texas A&M University on November 6, 1997

In April 1997, Ford joined President Bill Clinton, former president Bush, and Nancy Reagan in signing the "Summit Declaration of Commitment" in advocating for participation by private citizens in solving domestic issues within the United States.

On January 20, 1998, during an interview at his Palm Springs home, Ford said the Republican Party's nominee in the 2000 presidential election would lose if the party turned ultra-conservative in their ideals: "If we get way over on the hard right of the political spectrum, we will not elect a Republican President. I worry about the party going down this ultra-conservative line. We ought to learn from the Democrats: when they were running ultra-liberal candidates, they didn't win."

In the prelude to the impeachment of President Clinton, Ford conferred with former president Carter and the two agreed to not speak publicly on the controversy, a pact broken by Carter when answering a question from a student at Emory University.

In October 2001, Ford broke with conservative members of the Republican Party by stating that gay and lesbian couples "ought to be treated equally. Period." He became the highest-ranking Republican to embrace full equality for gays and lesbians, stating his belief that there should be a federal amendment outlawing anti-gay job discrimination and expressing his hope that the Republican Party would reach out to gay and lesbian voters. He also was a member of the Republican Unity Coalition, which The New York Times described as "a group of prominent Republicans, including former President Gerald R. Ford, dedicated to making sexual orientation a non-issue in the Republican Party".

On November 22, 2004, New York Republican governor George Pataki named Ford and the other living former presidents (Carter, George H. W. Bush and Bill Clinton) as honorary members of the board rebuilding the World Trade Center.

In a pre-recorded embargoed interview with Bob Woodward of The Washington Post in July 2004, Ford stated that he disagreed "very strongly" with the Bush administration's choice of Iraq's alleged weapons of mass destruction as justification for its decision to invade Iraq, calling it a "big mistake" unrelated to the national security of the United States and indicating that he would not have gone to war had he been president. The details of the interview were not released until after Ford's death, as he requested.

=== Health issues ===
On April 4, 1990, Ford was admitted to Eisenhower Medical Center for surgery to replace his left knee, orthopedic surgeon Robert Murphy saying, "Ford's entire left knee was replaced with an artificial joint, including portions of the adjacent femur, or thigh bone, and tibia, or leg bone."

Ford suffered two minor strokes at the 2000 Republican National Convention, but made a quick recovery after being admitted to Hahnemann University Hospital. In January 2006, he spent 11 days at the Eisenhower Medical Center near his residence at Rancho Mirage, California, for treatment of pneumonia. On April 23, 2006, President George W. Bush visited Ford at his home in Rancho Mirage for a little over an hour. This was Ford's last public appearance and produced the last known public photos, video footage, and voice recording.

While vacationing in Vail, Colorado, Ford was hospitalized for two days in July 2006 for shortness of breath. On August 15 he was admitted to St. Mary's Hospital of the Mayo Clinic in Rochester, Minnesota, for testing and evaluation. On August 21, it was reported that he had been fitted with a pacemaker. On August 25, he underwent an angioplasty procedure at the Mayo Clinic. On August 28, Ford was released from the hospital and returned with his wife Betty to their California home. On October 13, he was scheduled to attend the dedication of a building of his namesake, the Gerald R. Ford School of Public Policy at the University of Michigan, but due to poor health and on the advice of his doctors he did not attend. The previous day, Ford had entered the Eisenhower Medical Center for undisclosed tests; he was released on October 16. By November 2006, he was confined to a bed in his study.

== Death and funeral ==
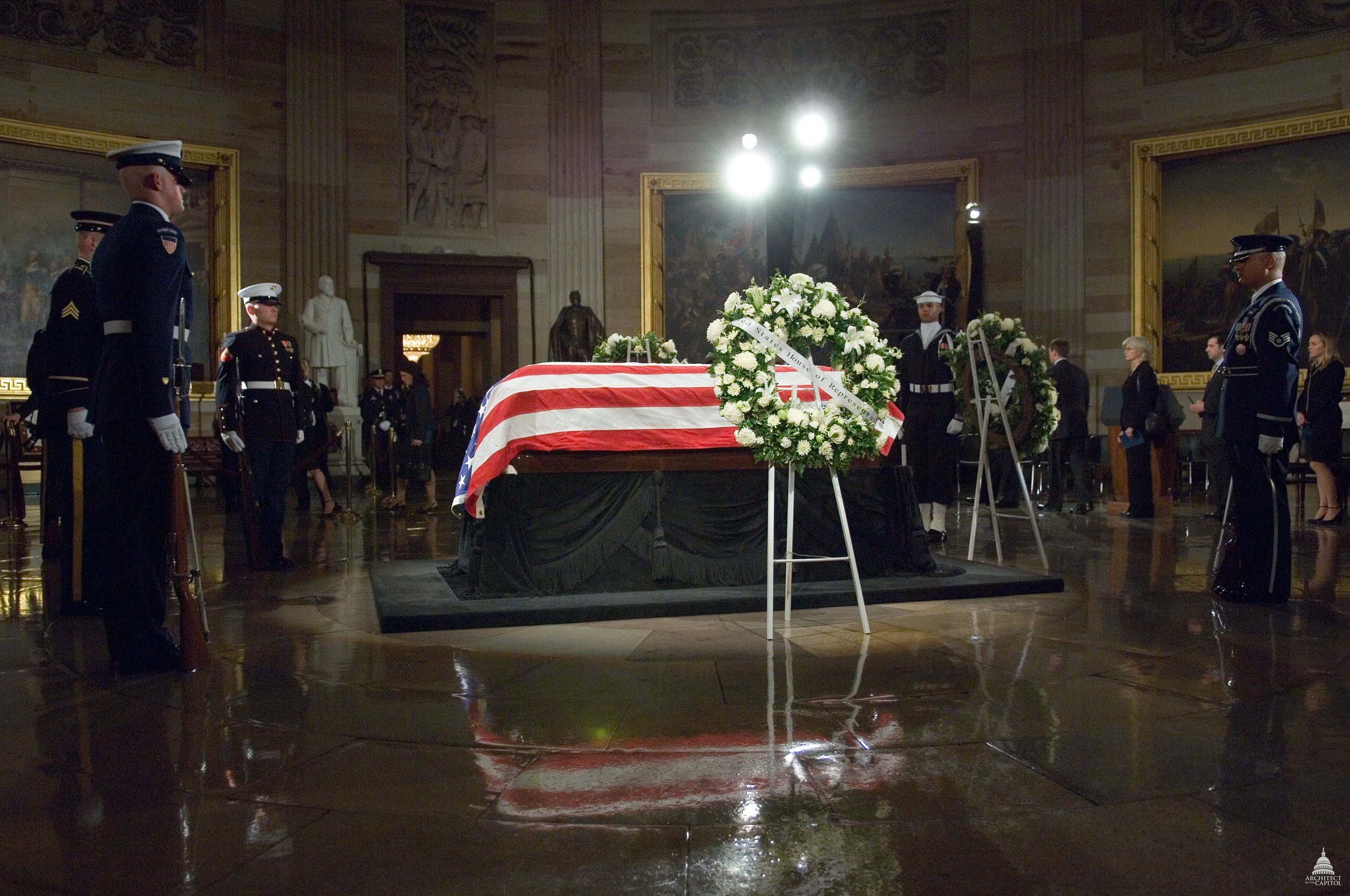
Ford lying in state in the U.S. Capitol rotunda

Ford died on December 26, 2006, at his home in Rancho Mirage, California, of arteriosclerotic cerebrovascular disease and diffuse arteriosclerosis. He had end-stage coronary artery disease and severe aortic stenosis and insufficiency, caused by calcific alteration of one of his heart valves. At the time of his death, Ford was the longest-lived U.S. president, having lived 93 years and 165 days (45 days longer than Ronald Reagan, whose record he surpassed). He died on the 34th anniversary of President Harry S. Truman's death; he was the last surviving member of the Warren Commission.

On December 30, 2006, Ford became the 11th U.S. president to lie in state in the Rotunda of the U.S. Capitol. A state funeral and memorial services were held at the Washington National Cathedral in Washington, D.C., on Tuesday, January 2, 2007. After the service, Ford was interred at the Gerald R. Ford Presidential Museum in Grand Rapids, Michigan.

Ford's family asked for Scouts to participate in his funeral. A few selected Scouts served as ushers inside the National Cathedral. About 400 Eagle Scouts were part of the funeral procession, where they formed an honor guard as the casket went by in front of the museum.

One of the songs selected by Ford during the procession was the University of Michigan fight song, as it was a favorite of his that he preferred to be played during his presidency. After his death in December 2006, the University of Michigan Marching Band played the school's fight song for him one final time, for his last ride from the Gerald R. Ford Airport in Grand Rapids, Michigan.

The State of Michigan commissioned and submitted a statue of Ford to the National Statuary Hall Collection, replacing Zachariah Chandler. It was unveiled on May 3, 2011, in the Capitol Rotunda.

== Personal life ==
=== Family ===
Speaking of his stepfather and his mother, Ford said, "My stepfather was a magnificent person and my mother equally wonderful. So I couldn't have written a better prescription for a superb family upbringing."

Ford had three younger half-siblings from the second marriage of his biological father, Leslie King Sr.; Marjorie King (1921–1993); Leslie Henry King (1923–1976); and Patricia Jane King (1925–1980). They never saw one another as children, and he did not know them at all until 1960. Ford was not aware of his biological father until he was 17, when his parents told him about the circumstances of his birth. That year, his biological father, whom Ford described as a "carefree, well-to-do man who didn't really give a damn about the hopes and dreams of his firstborn son," approached Ford while he was waiting tables in a Grand Rapids restaurant. The two "maintained a sporadic contact" until Leslie King Sr.'s death in 1941.

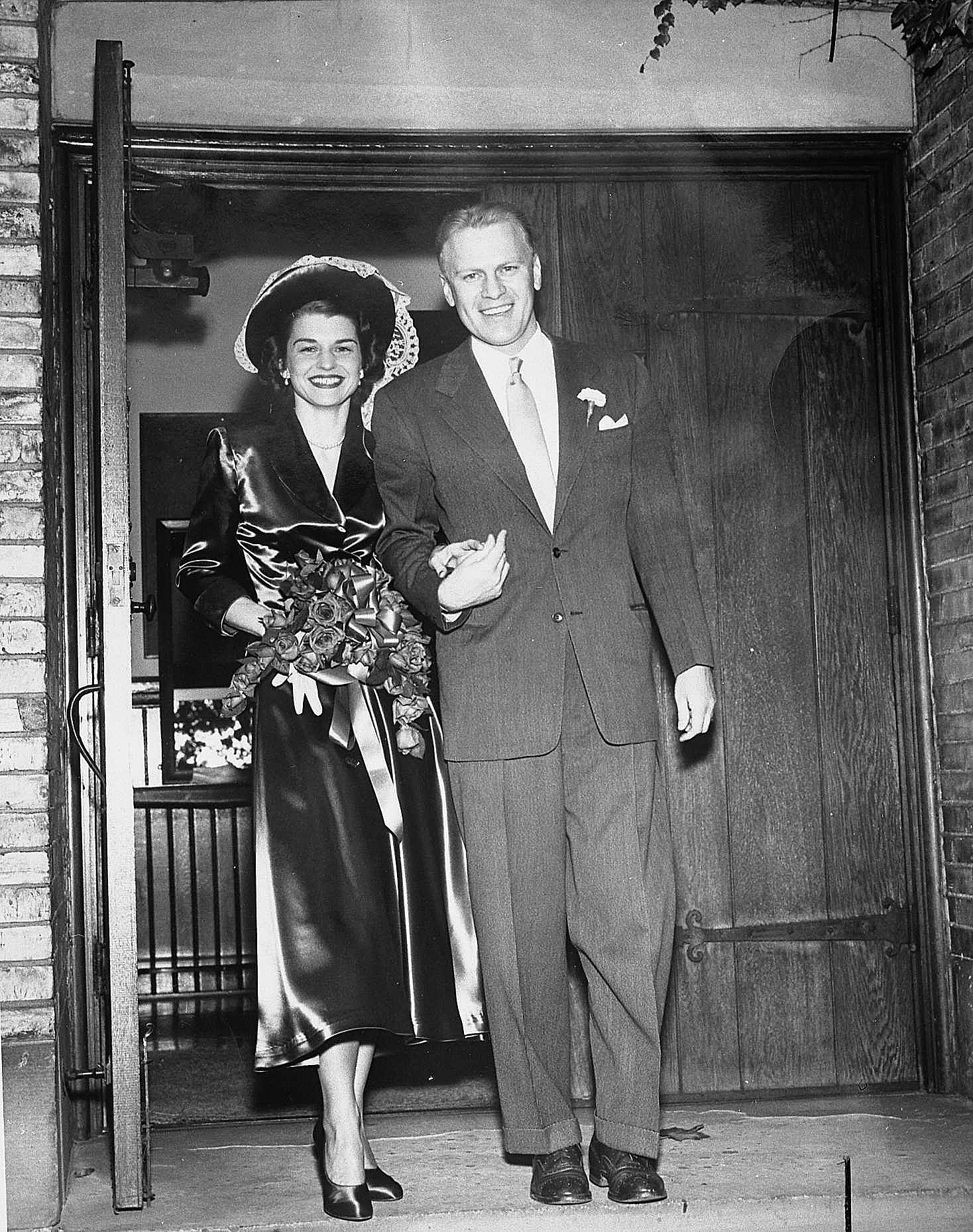
The Fords on their wedding day, October 15, 1948

On October 15, 1948, Ford married Elizabeth Bloomer (1918–2011) at Grace Episcopal Church in Grand Rapids.

Bloomer, who was originally from Grand Rapids herself, had been living in New York City for several years, where she had been working as a John Robert Powers fashion model, and as a dancer in the auxiliary troupe of the Martha Graham Dance Company. At the time of their engagement, Ford was campaigning for what would be the first of his 13 terms as a member of the United States House of Representatives. They delayed their wedding until shortly before the election because, as The New York Times reported in a 1974 profile of Betty Ford, "Jerry Ford was running for Congress and wasn't sure how voters might feel about his marrying a divorced exdancer."

The couple had four children: Michael Gerald, born in 1950; John Gardner (known as Jack), born in 1952; Steven Meigs, born in 1956; and Susan Elizabeth, born in 1957.

=== Civic and fraternal organizations ===
Ford was a member of several civic and fraternal organizations, including the Junior Chamber of Commerce (Jaycees), American Legion, AMVETS, Benevolent and Protective Order of Elks, Sons of the Revolution, Veterans of Foreign Wars, and was an alumnus of Delta Kappa Epsilon at Michigan.

==== Freemasonry ====
Ford was initiated into Freemasonry on September 30, 1949. He later said in 1975, "When I took my obligation as a master mason—incidentally, with my three younger brothers—I recalled the value my own father attached to that order. But I had no idea that I would ever be added to the company of the Father of our Country and 12 other members of the order who also served as Presidents of the United States." Ford was made a 33° Scottish Rite Mason on September 26, 1962. In April 1975, Ford was elected by a unanimous vote Honorary Grand Master of the International Supreme Council, Order of DeMolay, a position in which he served until January 1977. Ford received the degrees of York Rite Masonry (Chapter and Council degrees) in a special ceremony in the Oval Office on January 11, 1977, during his term as President of the United States.

Ford was also a member of the Shriners and the Royal Order of Jesters; both being affiliated bodies of Freemasonry.

== Public image ==
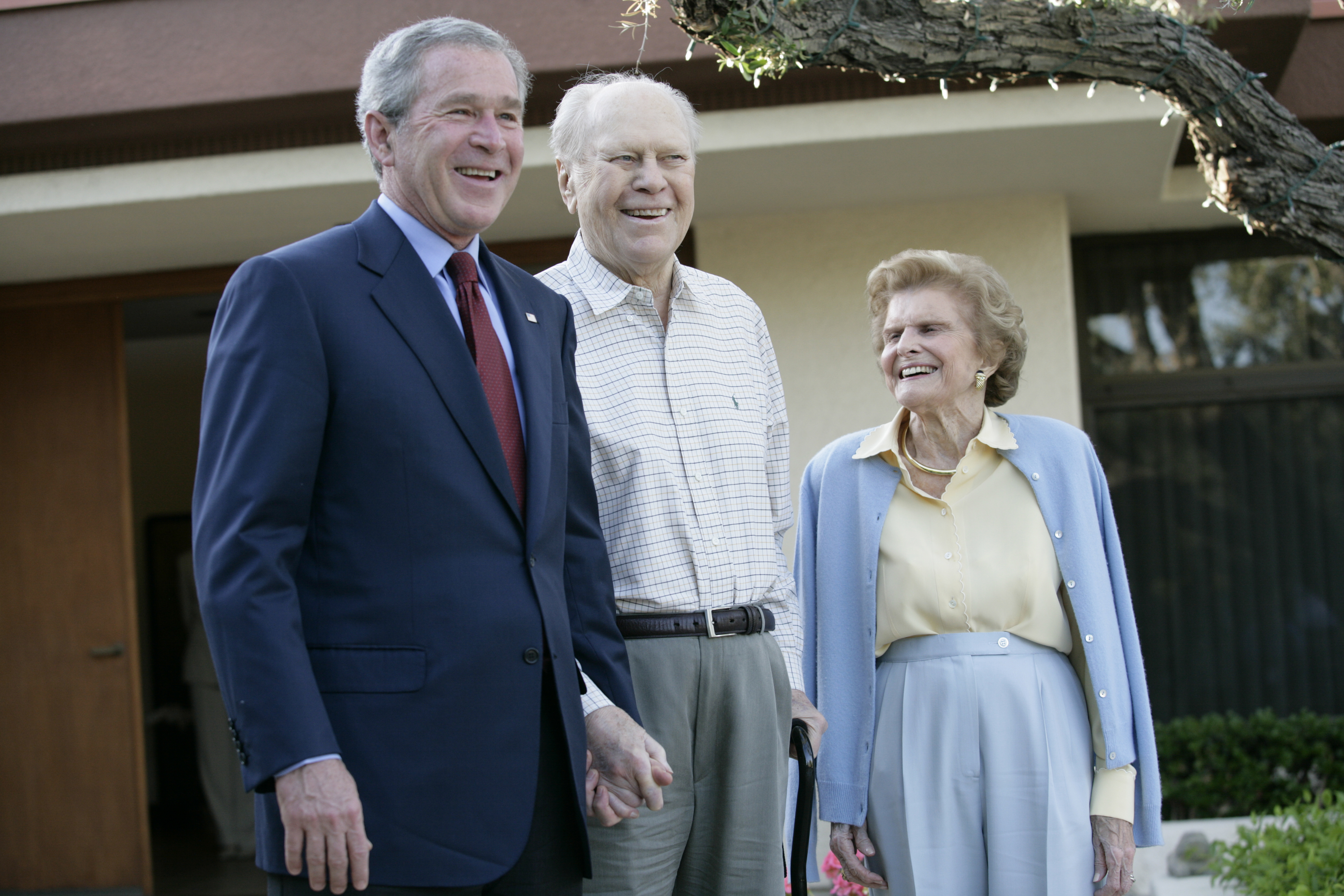
President George W. Bush with Ford and his wife Betty on April 23, 2006

Ford is the only person to hold the presidential office without being elected as either president or vice president. The choice of Ford to fill the vacant vice-presidency was based on Ford's reputation for openness and honesty. "In all the years I sat in the House, I never knew Mr. Ford to make a dishonest statement nor a statement part-true and part-false. He never attempted to shade a statement, and I never heard him utter an unkind word", said Martha Griffiths.

According to the Gallup Organization, Ford took office with the fourth-highest approval rating for a president following their inauguration, but the trust the American public had in him was rapidly and severely tarnished by the pardon of Nixon and his ratings fell an unprecedented 21 points. By January 1975, his disapproval rating had surpassed his approval rating.

In spite of his athletic record and remarkable career accomplishments, Ford acquired a reputation as a clumsy, likable, and simple-minded everyman. Henry Kissinger described him as "as close to a normal human being as we'll ever get in that office". Other pieces of the everyman image were attributed to his inevitable comparison with Nixon, his Midwestern stodginess, and his self-deprecation.

An incident in 1975, when Ford tripped while exiting Air Force One in Austria, was famously and repeatedly parodied by Chevy Chase on Saturday Night Live, cementing Ford's image as a klutz. Additionally, an incident in April 1976, when Ford bit into a still shuck-wrapped tamale, a culinary faux pas, made national news and contributed to the image of Ford as a chronic bumbler. The incident has become a cautionary tale about the hazards of eating on the campaign trail.

Ford has been portrayed in two television productions which included a central focus on his wife: the Emmy-winning 1987 ABC biographical television movie The Betty Ford Story, and the 2022 Showtime television series The First Lady.

== Honors ==
- Estonia:
  - First Class of the Order of the Cross of Terra Mariana (January 7, 1997)
- Ford received the Distinguished Eagle Scout Award in May 1970, as well as the Silver Buffalo Award, from the Boy Scouts of America.
- In 1974, he also received the highest distinction of the Scout Association of Japan, the Golden Pheasant Award. In 1985, he received the 1985 Old Tom Morris Award from the Golf Course Superintendents Association of America, GCSAA's highest honor. In 1992, the U.S. Navy Memorial Foundation awarded Ford its Lone Sailor Award for his naval service and his subsequent government service. In 1999, Ford was honored with a Golden Palm Star on the Palm Springs Walk of Stars. Also in 1999, Ford was awarded the Presidential Medal of Freedom by Bill Clinton. In 2001, he was presented with the John F. Kennedy Profiles in Courage Award for his decision to pardon Richard Nixon to stop the agony America was experiencing over Watergate.

The following are named after Ford:

- The Ford House Office Building in the U.S. Capitol Complex, formerly House Annex 2.
- Gerald R. Ford Freeway (Nebraska)
- Gerald R. Ford Freeway (Michigan)
- Gerald Ford Memorial Highway, I-70 in Eagle County, Colorado
- Gerald R. Ford International Airport in Grand Rapids, Michigan
- Gerald R. Ford Library in Ann Arbor, Michigan
- Gerald R. Ford Museum in Grand Rapids, Michigan
- Gerald R. Ford School of Public Policy, University of Michigan
- Gerald R. Ford Institute of Public Policy, Albion College
- USS Gerald R. Ford (CVN-78)
- Gerald R. Ford Middle School, Grand Rapids, Michigan
- President Gerald R. Ford Park in Alexandria, Virginia, located in the neighborhood where Ford lived while serving as a Representative and Vice President
- President Ford Field Service Council, Boy Scouts of America The council where he was awarded the rank of Eagle Scout. Serves 25 counties in Western and Northern Michigan with its headquarters located in Grand Rapids, Michigan.

== See also ==
- List of American sportsperson-politicians
- List of Freemasons
- List of members of the American Legion
- List of presidents of the United States
- List of presidents of the United States by previous experience
- List of vice presidents of the United States
- Presidents of the United States on U.S. postage stamps

== Bibliography ==
- Brinkley, Douglas (2007). Gerald R. Ford. New York: Times Books. ISBN 978-0-8050-6909-9. short biography
- Cannon, James. Gerald R. Ford: An Honorable Life (Ann Arbor: University of Michigan Press, 2013) 482 pp. official biography by a member of the Ford administration
  - Cannon, James (1993). Time and Chance: Gerald R. Ford's Appointment with History. Ann Arbor: University of Michigan Press. ISBN 978-0-472-08482-1. older full-scale biography
- Congressional Quarterly. President Ford: the man and his record (1974) online
- Firestone, Bernard J.; Ugrinsky, Alexej, eds. (1992). Gerald R. Ford and the Politics of Post-Watergate America. Westport, Conn.: Greenwood Press. ISBN 978-0-313-28009-2.
- John Robert Greene. The Limits of Power: The Nixon and Ford Administrations. ISBN 978-0-253-32637-9. Indiana University Press, 1992.
- John Robert Greene. The Presidency of Gerald R. Ford. ISBN 978-0-7006-0639-9. University Press of Kansas, 1995. the major scholarly study
- Hersey, John Richard. The President: A Minute-By-Minute Account of a Week in the Life of Gerald Ford. New York: Alfred A. Knopf. 1975.
- Hult, Karen M. and Walcott, Charles E. Empowering the White House: Governance under Nixon, Ford, and Carter. University Press of Kansas, 2004.
- Jespersen, T. Christopher. "Kissinger, Ford, and Congress: the Very Bitter End in Vietnam". Pacific Historical Review 2002 71#3: 439–473. Online Archived August 1, 2020, at the Wayback Machine
- Jespersen, T. Christopher. "The Bitter End and the Lost Chance in Vietnam: Congress, the Ford Administration, and the Battle over Vietnam, 1975–76". Diplomatic History 2000 24#2: 265–293. Online Archived January 26, 2020, at the Wayback Machine
- Kaufman, Scott (2017). Ambition, Pragmatism, and Party: A Political Biography of Gerald R. Ford. Lawrence, Kansas: University Press of Kansas. ISBN 978-0-7006-2500-0. latest full-scale biography
- Parmet, Herbert S. "Gerald R. Ford" in Henry F Graff ed., The Presidents: A Reference History (3rd ed. 2002); short scholarly overview
- Randolph, Sallie G. Gerald R. Ford, president (1987) online; for secondary schools
- Schoenebaum, Eleanora. Political Profiles: The Nixon/Ford years (1979) online, short biographies of over 500 political and national leaders.
- Smith, Richard Norton. An Ordinary Man: The Surprising Life and Historic Presidency of Gerald R. Ford (Harper, 2023)
- Williams, Daniel K. The Election of the Evangelical: Jimmy Carter, Gerald Ford, and the Presidential Contest of 1976 (University Press of Kansas, 2020) online review Archived August 20, 2021, at the Wayback Machine

=== Primary sources ===
- Ford, Gerald (1994). Presidential Perspectives from the National Archives. Washington, District of Columbia: National Archives and Records Administration. ISBN 978-1-880875-04-9.
- Ford, Gerald (1987). Humor and the Presidency. New York: Arbor House. ISBN 978-0-87795-918-2.
- Ford, Gerald (1979). A Time to Heal: The Autobiography of Gerald R. Ford. New York, New York: Harper & Row. ISBN 978-0-06-011297-4.
- "Gerald Ford Presidential Autograph Letters". SMF. Shapell Manuscript Foundation. Archived from the original on October 29, 2018.
- Ford, Gerald (1973). Selected Speeches. Arlington, Va.: R. W. Beatty. ISBN 978-0-87948-029-5.
- Ford, Gerald (1965). Portrait of the assassin (Lee Harvey Oswald). New York, New York: Simon & Schuster. ISBN 978-1-121-97551-4.
- Ford, Betty (1978). The Times of My Life. New York: Harper & Row. ISBN 978-0-06-011298-1.
- Thompson, Kenneth, ed. (1980). The Ford Presidency: Twenty-Two Intimate Perspectives of Gerald Ford. Lanham: University Press of America. ISBN 978-0-8191-6960-0.

U.S. House of Representatives
Preceded by Bartel J. Jonkman	Member of the U.S. House of Representatives from Michigan's 5th congressional district 1949–1973	Succeeded by Richard Vander Veen
Preceded by Charles A. Halleck	House Minority Leader; 1965–1973	Succeeded by John Jacob Rhodes
Party political offices
Preceded by Charles B. Hoeven	Chair of the House Republican Conference; 1963–1965	Succeeded by Melvin Laird
Preceded by Charles A. Halleck	House Republican Leader; 1965–1973	Succeeded by John Jacob Rhodes
First	Response to the State of the Union address 1966, 1967, 1968; Served alongside: Everett Dirksen (1966, 1967), Howard Baker, George H. W. Bush, Peter Dominick, Robert Griffin, Thomas Kuchel, Mel Laird, Bob Mathias, George Murphy, Dick Poff, Chuck Percy, Al Quie, Charlotte Reid, Hugh Scott, Bill Steiger, John Tower (1968)	Vacant Title next held by Donald Fraser, Scoop Jackson, Mike Mansfield, John McCormack, Patsy Mink, Ed Muskie, Bill Proxmire
Preceded by Richard Nixon	Republican nominee for President of the United States; 1976	Succeeded by Ronald Reagan
Political offices
Preceded by Spiro Agnew	Vice President of the United States; 1973–1974	Succeeded by Nelson Rockefeller
Preceded by Richard Nixon	President of the United States; 1974–1977	Succeeded by Jimmy Carter
Diplomatic posts
Preceded by Valéry Giscard d'Estaing	Chair of the Group of Seven; 1976	Succeeded by James Callaghan
