= Democratic Party (United States) =

Political party

- Abbreviation: Dem., D
- Chairperson: Ken Martin
- Governing body: Democratic National Committee
- Senate Minority Leader: Chuck Schumer
- House Minority Leader: Hakeem Jeffries
- Founders: Andrew Jackson; Martin Van Buren
- Founded: January 8, 1828; 198 years ago
- Preceded by: Democratic-Republican Party
- Headquarters: 430 South Capitol St. SE, Washington, D.C., U.S.
- Student wing: High School Democrats of America; College Democrats of America
- Youth wing: Young Democrats of America
- Women's wing: National Federation of Democratic Women
- LGBTQ wing: National Stonewall Democrats
- Overseas wing: Democrats Abroad
- Registered voters (July 2026): 44.4 million (35.0%) (Note: Only includes voters registered as party affiliates in the District of Columbia and the 32 states which allow voter registration with a specific party. Voters can also register as "independent", which has risen over time. In the United States, voter registration determines eligibility to vote in internal party elections such as primaries, rather than dues-paying membership as in the rest of the world. Voter registration states include Alaska, Arizona, Arkansas, California, Colorado, Connecticut, Delaware, District of Columbia, Florida, Idaho, Iowa, Kansas, Kentucky, Louisiana, Maine, Maryland, Massachusetts, Missouri, Nebraska, Nevada, New Hampshire, New Jersey, New Mexico, New York, North Carolina, Oklahoma, Oregon, Pennsylvania, South Dakota, Utah, West Virginia and Wyoming. The remaining states lean heavily Republican, so the total percentage of the population that's Democrat or Republican is much closer than these values depict.)
- Ideology: Liberalism (Note: Liberalism is the dominant ideology of the Democratic Party.); Factions: Economic populism (Note: The economic populist faction, which saw strong electoral success in the 2026 midterms, overlaps with progressivism on economics but prioritizes class politics over social progressivism.); Progressivism (US) (Note: The progressive faction of the Democratic Party has slowly grown since the 2000s, particularly since the Bernie Sanders 2016 presidential campaign.)
- Political position: Center to center-left
- Caucuses: Blue Dog Coalition; New Democrat Coalition; Congressional Progressive Caucus
- Colors: Blue
- Senate: 45 / 100 (Note: 45 senators are members of the party; however, two independent senators, Angus King and Bernie Sanders, caucus with the Democrats.)
- House of Representatives: 214 / 435
- State governors: 24 / 50
- State upper chambers: 841 / 1,973
- State lower chambers: 2,399 / 5,413
- Territorial governors: 2 / 5
- Territorial upper chambers: 21 / 97
- Territorial lower chambers: 9 / 91

Election symbol

Website
- democrats.org

The Democratic Party is a liberal political party in the United States, sitting on the center to center-left of the political spectrum. Founded in 1828, it is the world's oldest active political party. Its main rival is the Republican Party; since the 1850s, both have dominated American politics.

The Democratic Party initially supported Jacksonian democracy, agrarianism, and geographical expansionism, while opposing a national bank and high tariffs. Democrats won six of the eight presidential elections from 1828 to 1856, losing twice to the Whigs. In 1860, the party split into Northern and Southern factions over slavery. The party remained dominated by agrarian interests, contrasting with Republican support for the big business of the Gilded Age. A Democratic candidate won the presidency only twice (Note: Grover Cleveland in 1884 and 1892) between 1860 and 1908, although Democratic candidates won the popular vote two more times in that period. (Note: Samuel Tilden in 1876 and Grover Cleveland in 1888) During the Progressive Era, some factions of the party supported progressive reforms, with Woodrow Wilson being elected president in 1912 and 1916.

In 1932, Franklin D. Roosevelt was elected president after campaigning on a strong response to the Great Depression. His New Deal programs created a broad Democratic coalition that united white Southerners, Northern workers, labor unions, African Americans, Catholic and Jewish communities, progressives, and liberals. From the late 1930s, a conservative minority in the party's Southern wing joined with Republicans as a reaction to progressive domestic reforms. After the civil rights movement and Great Society era of progressive legislation under Lyndon B. Johnson, who was often able to overcome the conservative coalition in the 1960s, many white Southerners switched to the Republican Party as the Northeastern states became more reliably Democratic. The party's labor union element has weakened since the 1970s amid deindustrialization, and during the 1980s it lost many white working-class voters to the Republicans under Ronald Reagan. The election of Bill Clinton in 1992 marked a shift for the party toward centrism and the Third Way, shifting its economic stance toward market-based policies. Barack Obama oversaw passage of the Affordable Care Act in 2010, which passed along party lines.

On economic issues, the party favors healthcare reform, paid sick leave, paid family leave and supporting unions. On social issues, it advocates for abortion rights, gun control, LGBTQ rights, action on climate change, the legalization of marijuana, and a pathway to citizenship for undocumented immigrants. Since 2016, the party has seen a significant growth in support for progressivism. In foreign policy, the party supports liberal internationalism and aid to Ukraine, as well as tough stances against Russia.

== History ==
Democratic Party officials often trace its origins to the Democratic-Republican Party, founded by Thomas Jefferson, James Madison, and other influential opponents of the conservative Federalists in 1792. That party died out before the modern Democratic Party was organized; the Jeffersonian party also inspired the Whigs and modern Republicans. Historians argue that the modern Democratic Party was first organized in the late 1820s with the election of war hero Andrew Jackson of Tennessee, making it the world's oldest active political party. It was predominately built by Martin Van Buren who assembled a wide cadre of politicians in every state behind Jackson.

Since the nomination of William Jennings Bryan in 1896, the party has generally positioned itself to the left of the Republican Party on economic issues, though Progressive Republicans persisted until the 1930s. Democrats have been more liberal on civil rights since 1948, though conservative factions within the Democratic Party that opposed them persisted in the South until the 1960s. On foreign policy, both parties have changed positions several times.

=== Background ===
The Democratic Party evolved from the Democratic-Republican Party organized by Thomas Jefferson and James Madison in opposition to the Federalist Party. The

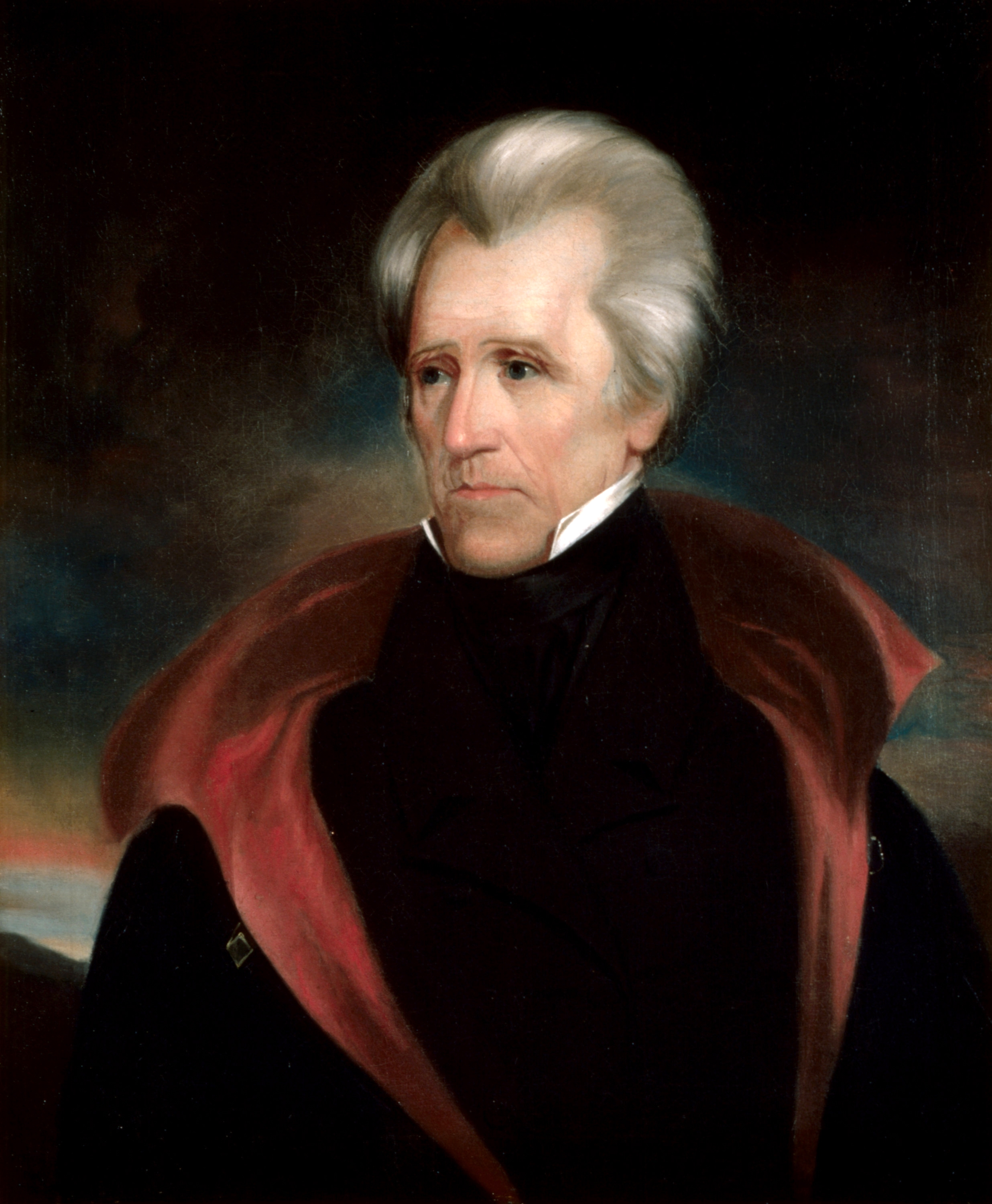
Andrew Jackson was the seventh president (1829–1837) and the first Democratic president.

Democratic-Republican Party favored republicanism, a weak federal government, states' rights, agrarian interests (especially Southern planters), and strict adherence to the Constitution. The party opposed a national bank and Great Britain. After the War of 1812, the Federalists virtually disappeared and the only national political party left was the Democratic-Republicans, which was prone to splinter along regional lines. The era of one-party rule in the United States, known as the Era of Good Feelings, lasted from 1816 until 1828, when Andrew Jackson became president. Jackson and Martin Van Buren worked with allies in each state to form a new Democratic Party on a national basis. In the 1830s, the Whig Party coalesced into the main rival to the Democrats.

When exactly the Democratic Party formed is still debated among historians, with many putting forth the 1828 date of the creation of a federal structure for the various Jacksonian movements as the foundation date, however, it could also be argued that the foundation of these Jacksonian groups could be the foundation date. In that case, the Democratic Party would be formed on December 23, 1823, when the Greensburg Committee read the Greensburg Resolution outside the Westmoreland County Courthouse in Greensburg, Pennsylvania. The committee consisted of five of Greensburg's most prominent political figures, the brothers Jacob M. Wise (state senator), John H. Wise (state representative and brigadier general), and Frederick A. Wise (owner and editor of the Westmoreland Republican), alongside David Marchand (state representative), and James Clarke (state representative). The Greensburg Resolution was the first published call for Jackson to run for president with the committee being the first overtly "Jacksonian" organization, dubbed the 'origin' of the Jackson movement that turned into the Democratic Party.

The event that transformed the Jacksonians from just another faction of the Democratic-Republican party into a divergent political force would be the so-called "corrupt bargain" of 1824, where, despite his winning the most popular and electoral votes, the House of Representatives did not confirm Jackson as the newly elected president, instead Henry Clay, who was both a candidate and the speaker of the house, whipped his supporters in congress to vote for the runner-up, John Quincy Adams, in exchange for Adams's naming Clay the Secretary of State. Jackson and his followers began to coalesce more seriously into a structured party for the next election in 1828, and the party's birth is most often marked as Jackson's campaign launch on January 8 of that year, or sometimes as four years later at the inaugural 1832 Democratic National Convention.

Before 1860, the Democratic Party supported expansive presidential power, the interests of slave states, agrarianism, and expansionism, while opposing a national bank and high tariffs.

=== 19th century ===
==== Jacksonian Era ====
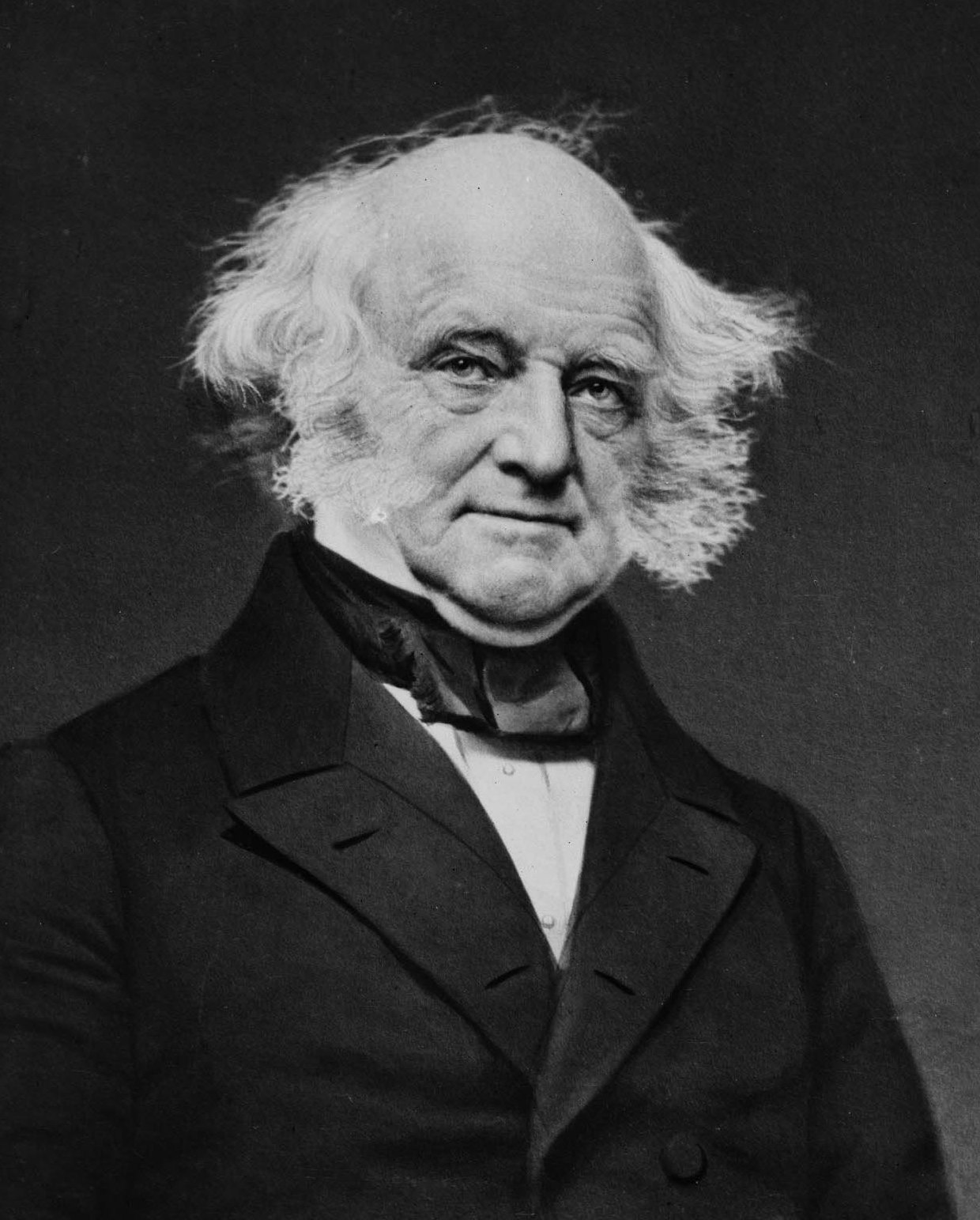
Martin Van Buren was the eighth president (1837–1841).

The Democratic-Republican Party split over the choice of a successor to President James Monroe. The faction that supported many of the old Jeffersonian principles, led by Andrew Jackson and Martin Van Buren, became the modern Democratic Party. Historian Mary Beth Norton explains the transformation in 1828:

Jacksonians believed the people's will had finally prevailed. Through a lavishly financed coalition of state parties, political leaders, and newspaper editors, a popular movement had elected the president. The Democrats became the nation's first well-organized national party ... and tight party organization became the hallmark of nineteenth-century American politics.

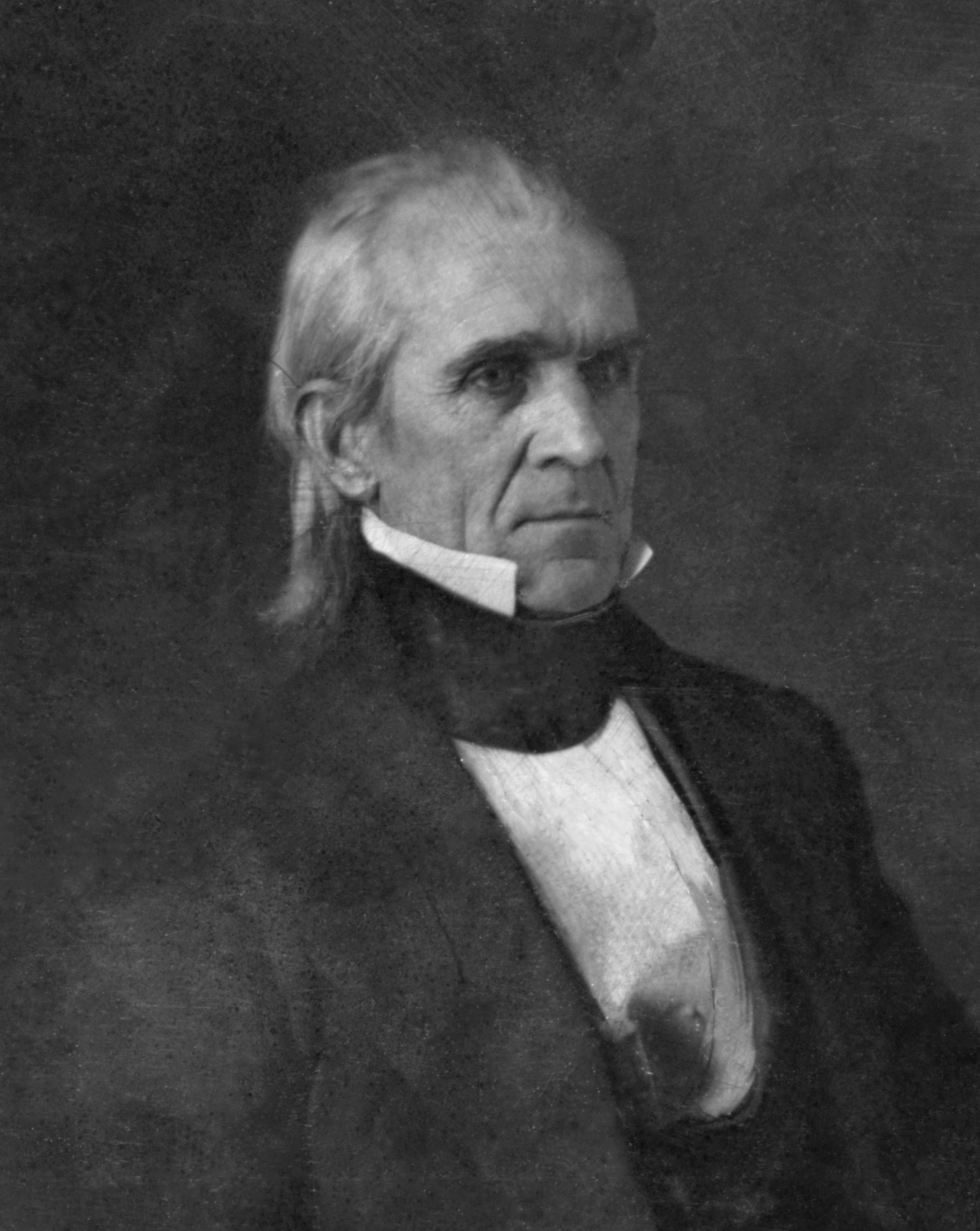
James K. Polk was the 11th president (1845–1849). He significantly extended the territory of the United States.

Behind the platforms issued by state and national parties stood a widely shared political outlook that characterized the Democrats:

The Democrats represented a wide range of views but shared a fundamental commitment to the Jeffersonian concept of an agrarian society. They viewed the central government as the enemy of individual liberty. The 1824 "corrupt bargain" had strengthened their suspicion of Washington politics. ... Jacksonians feared the concentration of economic and political power. They believed that government intervention in the economy benefited special-interest groups and created corporate monopolies that favored the rich. They sought to restore the independence of the individual—the artisan and the ordinary farmer—by ending federal support of banks and corporations and restricting the use of paper currency, which they distrusted. Their definition of the proper role of government tended to be negative, and Jackson's political power was largely expressed in negative acts. He exercised the veto more than all previous presidents combined. ... Nor did Jackson share reformers' humanitarian concerns. He had no sympathy for American Indians, initiating the removal of the Cherokees along the Trail of Tears.

Opposing factions led by Henry Clay helped form the Whig Party. The Democratic Party had a small yet decisive advantage over the Whigs until the 1850s when the Whigs fell apart over the issue of slavery. In 1854, angry with the Kansas–Nebraska Act, anti-slavery Democrats left the party and joined Northern Whigs to form the Republican Party. Martin van Buren also helped found the Free Soil Party to oppose the spread of slavery, running as its candidate in the 1848 presidential election, before returning to the Democratic Party and staying loyal to the Union.

==== American Civil War ====
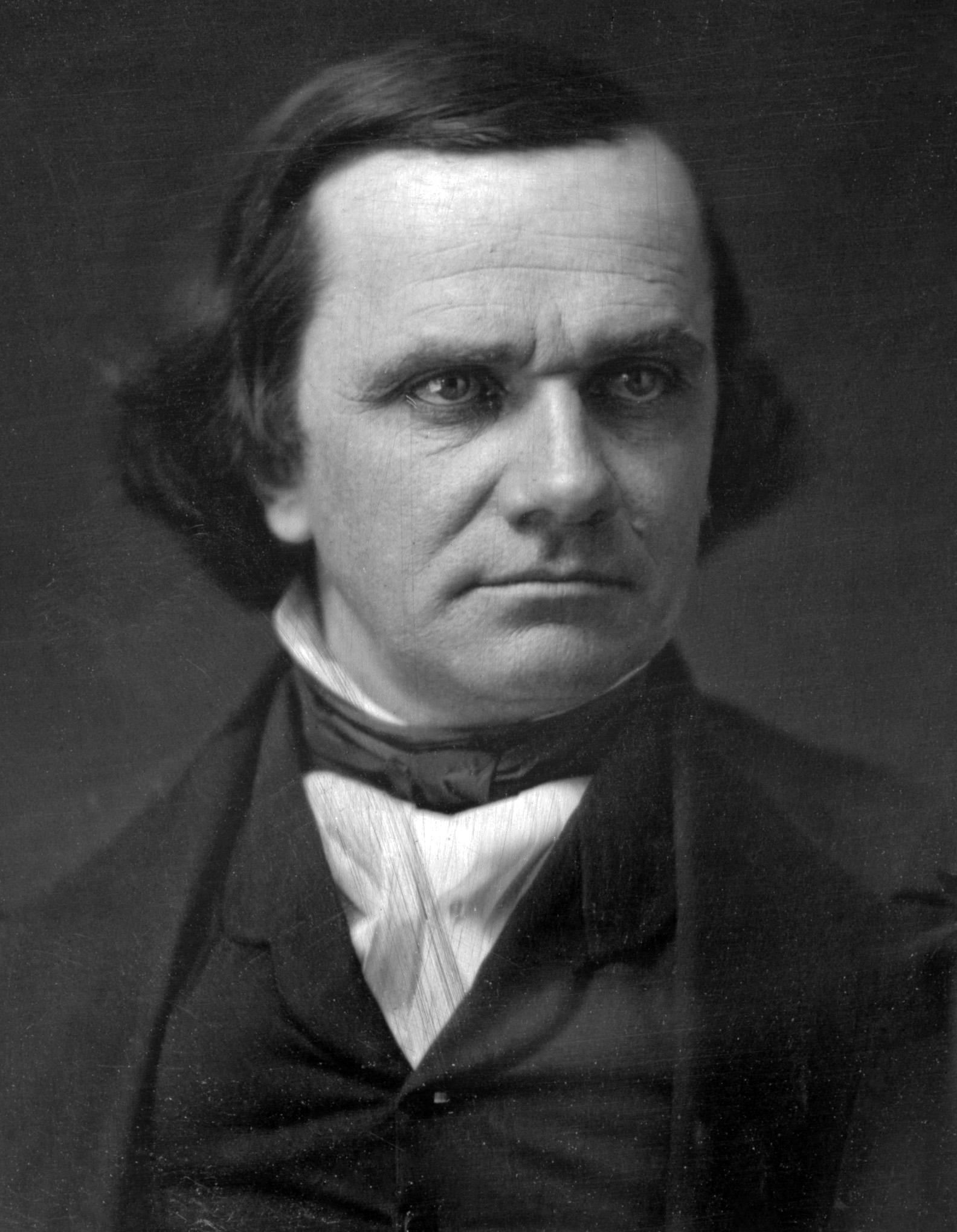
Stephen A. Douglas was a United States senator for Illinois.

The Democrats split over slavery, with Northern and Southern tickets in the election of 1860, in which the Republican Party gained ascendancy. The radical pro-slavery Fire-Eaters led walkouts at the two conventions when the delegates would not adopt a resolution supporting the extension of slavery into territories even if the voters of those territories did not want it. These Southern Democrats nominated the pro-slavery incumbent vice president, John C. Breckinridge of Kentucky, for president and General Joseph Lane, of Oregon, for vice president. The Northern Democrats nominated Senator Stephen A. Douglas of Illinois for president and former Georgia Governor Herschel V. Johnson for vice president. This fracturing of the Democrats led to a Republican victory and Abraham Lincoln was elected the 16th president of the United States.

As the American Civil War broke out, Northern Democrats were divided into War Democrats and Peace Democrats. The Confederate States of America deliberately avoided organized political parties. Most War Democrats rallied to Republican president Abraham Lincoln and the Republicans' National Union Party in the election of 1864, which featured Andrew Johnson on the Union ticket to attract fellow Democrats. Johnson replaced Lincoln in 1865, but he stayed independent of both parties.

==== Reconstruction and Redemption ====
The Democrats benefited from white Southerners' resentment of Reconstruction after the war and consequent hostility to the Republican Party. After Redeemers ended Reconstruction in the 1870s, and following the often extremely violent disenfranchisement of African Americans led by such white supremacist Democratic politicians as Benjamin Tillman of South Carolina in the 1880s and 1890s, the South, voting Democratic, became known as the "Solid South". Although Republicans won all but two presidential elections, the Democrats remained competitive. The party was dominated by pro-business Bourbon Democrats led by Samuel J. Tilden and Grover Cleveland, who represented mercantile, banking, and railroad interests; opposed imperialism and overseas expansion; fought for the gold standard; opposed bimetallism; and crusaded against corruption, high taxes and tariffs. Cleveland was elected to non-consecutive presidential terms in 1884 and 1892.

=== 20th century ===
==== Progressive era ====
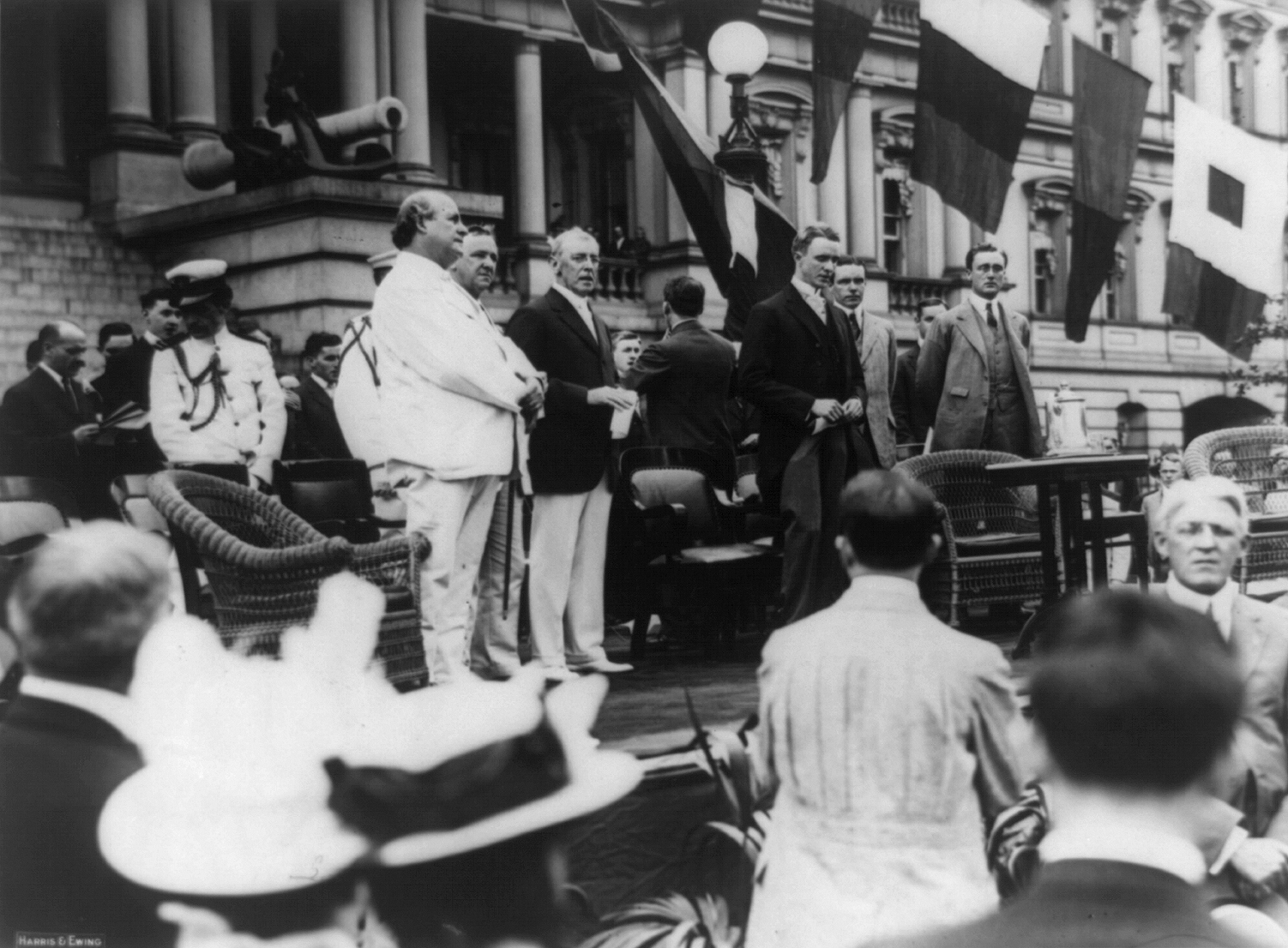
Leaders of the Democratic Party during the first half of the 20th century in 1913: William Jennings Bryan, Josephus Daniels, Woodrow Wilson, Breckinridge Long, William Phillips, and Franklin D. Roosevelt.

Agrarian Democrats demanding free silver, drawing on Populist ideas, overthrew the Bourbon Democrats in 1896 and nominated William Jennings Bryan for the presidency (a nomination repeated by Democrats in 1900 and 1908). Bryan waged a vigorous campaign attacking Eastern moneyed interests, but he lost to Republican William McKinley.

The Democrats took control of the House in 1910, and Woodrow Wilson won election as president in 1912 (when the Republicans split) and 1916. Wilson effectively led Congress to put to rest the issues of tariffs, money, and antitrust, which had dominated politics for 40 years, with new progressive laws. He failed to secure Senate passage of the Versailles Treaty (ending the war with Germany and joining the League of Nations). The weakened party was deeply divided by issues such as the KKK and prohibition in the 1920s. However, it did organize new ethnic voters in Northern cities.

After World War I ended and continuing through the Great Depression, the Democratic and Republican Parties both largely believed in American exceptionalism over European monarchies and state socialism that existed elsewhere in the world.

==== 1930s–1960s and the rise of the New Deal coalition ====
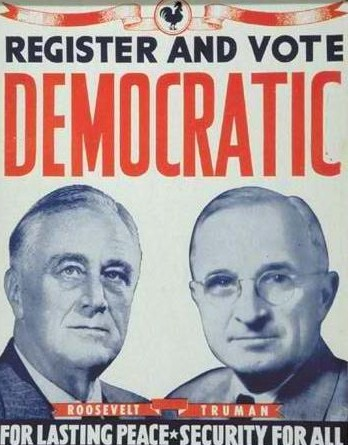
Franklin D. Roosevelt and Harry S. Truman, the 32nd and 33rd presidents (1933–1945; 1945–1953), featured on a campaign poster for the 1944 presidential election; note the rooster logo of the Democratic Party (see Names and Symbols below).

The Great Depression in 1929 that began under Republican president Herbert Hoover and the Republican Congress set the stage for a more liberal government as the Democrats controlled the House of Representatives nearly uninterrupted from 1930 until 1994, the Senate for 44 of 48 years from 1930, and won most presidential elections until 1968. Franklin D. Roosevelt, elected to the presidency in 1932, came forth with federal government programs called the New Deal. New Deal liberalism meant the regulation of business (especially finance and banking) and the promotion of labor unions as well as federal spending to aid the unemployed, help distressed farmers, and undertake large-scale public works projects. It marked the start of the American welfare state. The opponents, who stressed opposition to unions, support for business and low taxes, started calling themselves "conservatives".

Until the 1980s, the Democratic Party was a coalition of two parties divided by the Mason–Dixon line: liberal Democrats in the North and culturally conservative voters in the South, who, though benefiting from many of the New Deal public-works projects, opposed increasing civil rights initiatives advocated by Northeastern liberals. The polarization grew stronger after Roosevelt died. Southern Democrats formed a key part of the bipartisan conservative coalition in an alliance with most of the Midwestern Republicans. The economically activist philosophy of Franklin D. Roosevelt, which has strongly influenced American liberalism, shaped much of the party's economic agenda after 1932. From the 1930s to the mid-1960s, the liberal New Deal coalition usually controlled the presidency while the conservative coalition usually controlled Congress.

==== 1960s–1980s and the collapse of the New Deal coalition ====
Issues facing parties and the United States after World War II included the Cold War and the civil rights movement. Republicans attracted conservatives and, after the 1960s, white Southerners from the Democratic coalition with their use of the Southern strategy and resistance to New Deal and Great Society liberalism. Until the 1950s, African Americans had traditionally supported the Republican Party because of its anti-slavery civil rights policies. Following the passage of the Civil Rights Act of 1964 and Voting Rights Act of 1965, the Southern states became more reliably Republican in presidential politics, while Northeastern states became more reliably Democratic. Studies show that Southern whites, who were a core constituency in the Democratic Party, shifted to the Republican Party due to racial backlash and social conservatism.

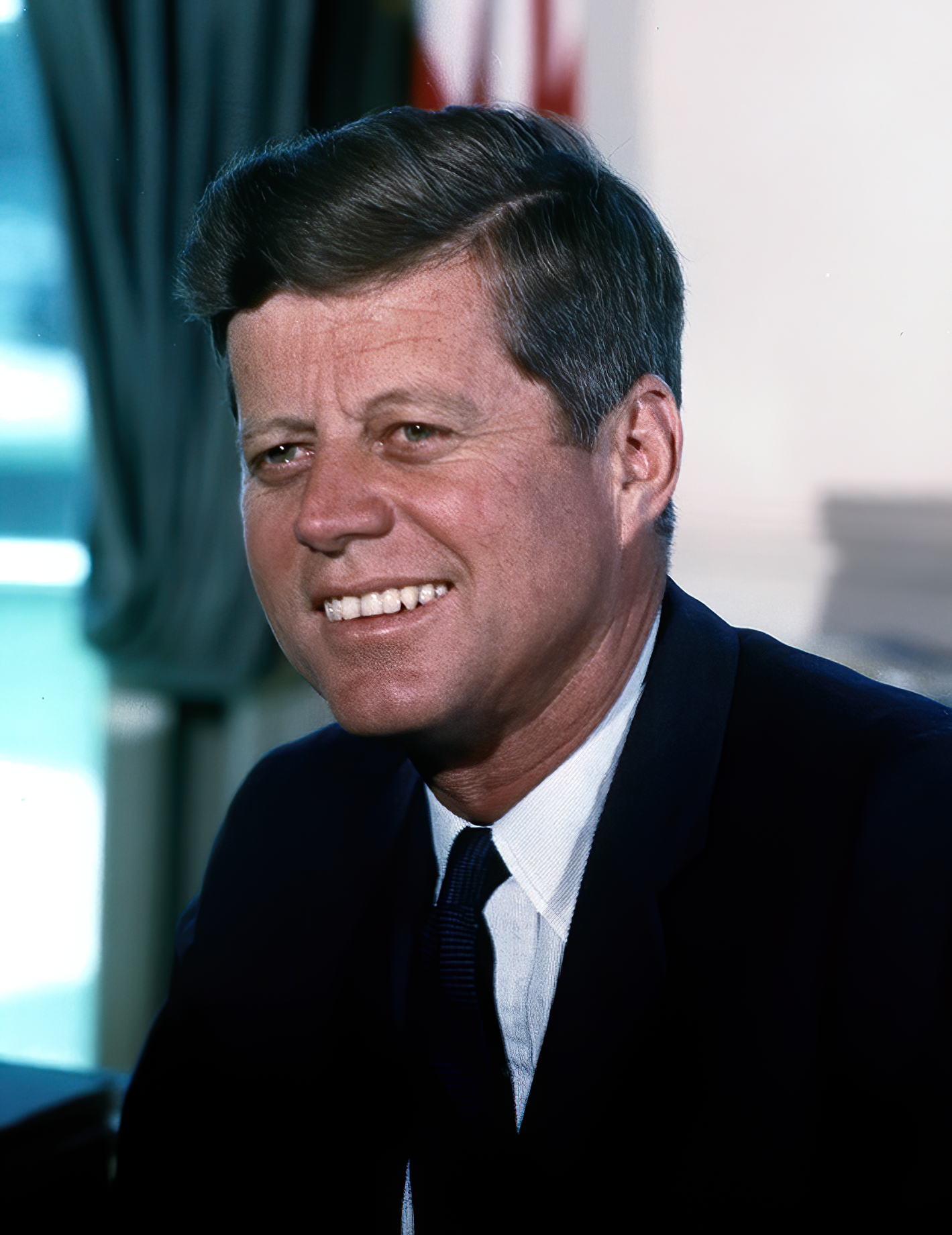
John F. Kennedy, the 35th president (1961–1963)

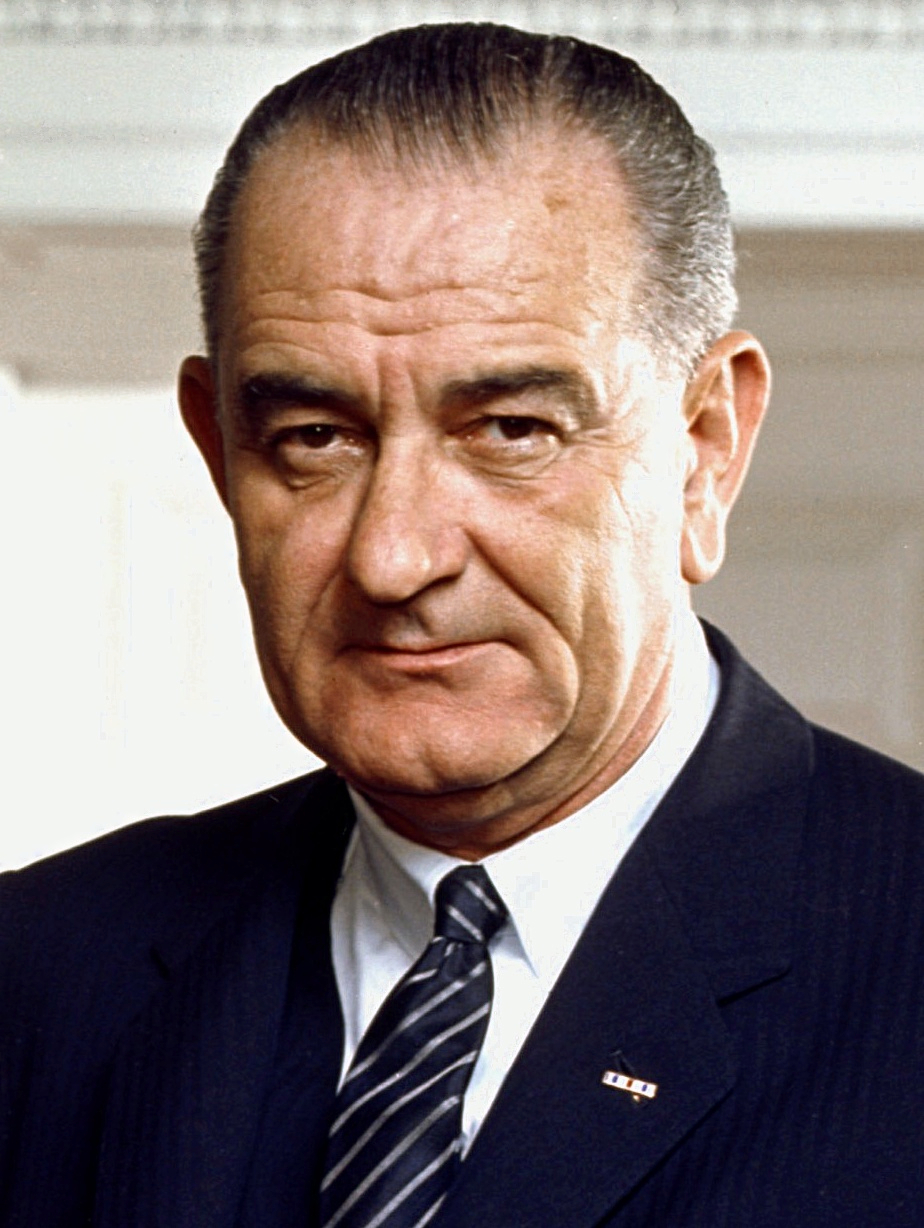
Lyndon B. Johnson, the 36th president (1963–1969)

The election of President John F. Kennedy from Massachusetts in 1960 partially reflected this shift. In the campaign, Kennedy attracted a new generation of younger voters. In his agenda dubbed the New Frontier, Kennedy introduced a host of social programs and public works projects, along with enhanced support of the space program, proposing a crewed spacecraft trip to the moon by the end of the decade. He pushed for civil rights initiatives and proposed the Civil Rights Act of 1964, but with his assassination in November 1963, he was not able to see its passage.

Kennedy's successor Lyndon B. Johnson was able to persuade the largely conservative Congress to pass the Civil Rights Act of 1964, and with a more progressive Congress in 1965 passed much of the Great Society, including Medicare and Medicaid, which consisted of an array of social programs designed to help the poor, sick, and elderly. Kennedy and Johnson's advocacy of civil rights further solidified black support for the Democrats but had the effect of alienating Southern whites who would eventually gravitate toward the Republican Party, particularly after the election of Ronald Reagan to the presidency in 1980. Many conservative Southern Democrats defected to the Republican Party, beginning with the passage of the Civil Rights Act of 1964 and the general leftward shift of the party.

The United States' involvement in the Vietnam War in the 1960s was another divisive issue that further fractured the fault lines of the Democrats' coalition. After the Gulf of Tonkin Resolution in 1964, President Johnson committed a large contingency of combat troops to Vietnam, but the escalation failed to drive the Viet Cong from South Vietnam, resulting in an increasing quagmire, which by 1968 had become the subject of widespread anti-war protests in the United States and elsewhere. With increasing casualties and nightly news reports bringing home troubling images from Vietnam, the costly military engagement became increasingly unpopular, alienating many of the kinds of young voters that the Democrats had attracted in the early 1960s. The protests that year along with assassinations of Martin Luther King Jr. and Democratic presidential candidate Senator Robert F. Kennedy (younger brother of John F. Kennedy) climaxed in turbulence at the hotly-contested Democratic National Convention that summer in Chicago (which among the ensuing turmoil inside and outside of the convention hall nominated Vice President Hubert Humphrey) in a series of events that proved to mark a significant turning point in the decline of the Democratic Party's broad coalition.

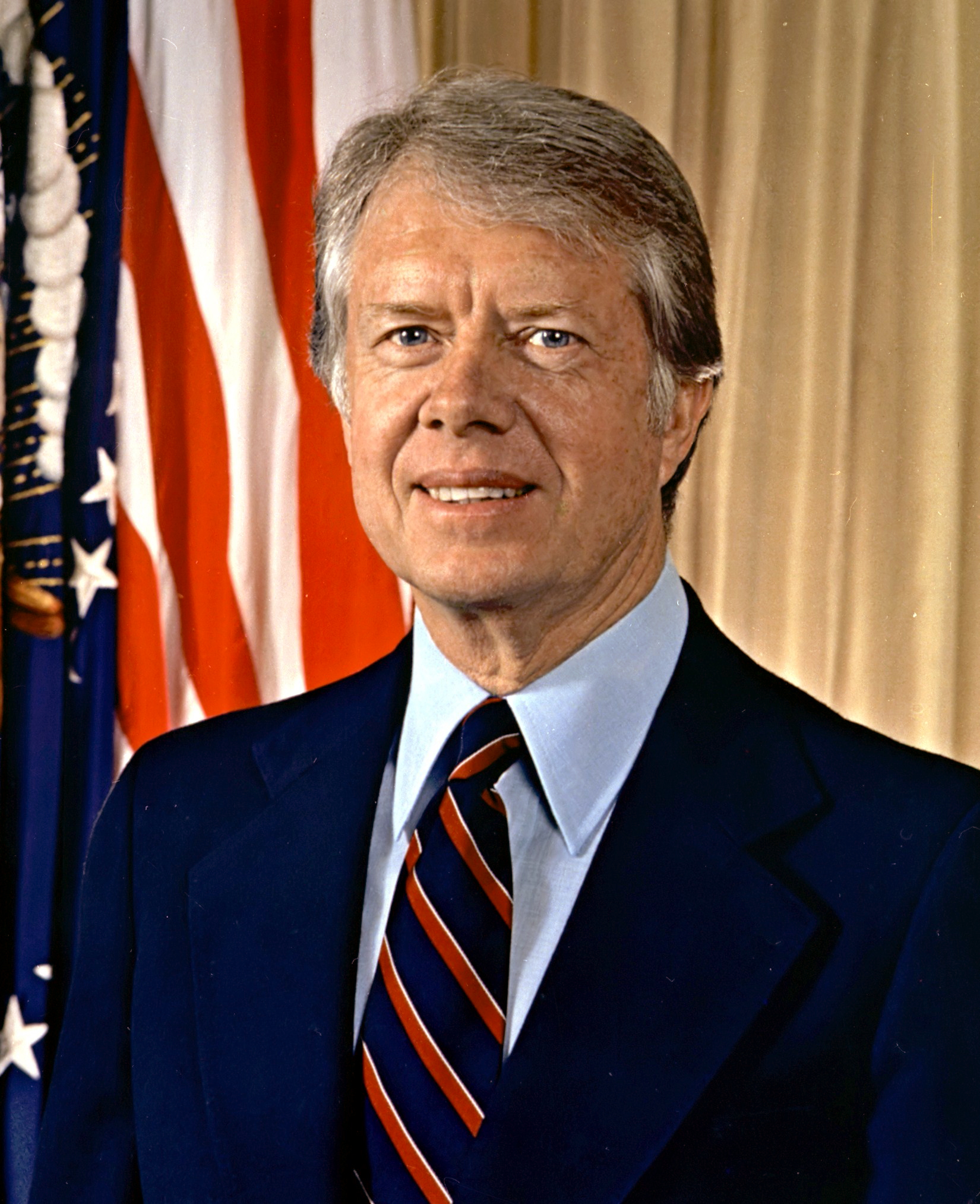
Jimmy Carter, the 39th president (1977–1981)

Republican presidential nominee Richard Nixon was able to capitalize on the confusion of the Democrats that year and won the 1968 election to become the 37th president. He won re-election in a landslide in 1972 against Democratic nominee George McGovern, who like Robert F. Kennedy, reached out to the younger anti-war and counterculture voters, but unlike Kennedy, was not able to appeal to the party's more traditional white working-class constituencies. During Nixon's second term, his presidency was rocked by the Watergate scandal, which forced him to resign in 1974. He was succeeded by vice president Gerald Ford, who served a brief tenure.

Watergate offered the Democrats an opportunity to recoup, and their nominee Jimmy Carter won the 1976 presidential election. With the initial support of evangelical Christian voters in the South, Carter was temporarily able to reunite the disparate factions within the party, but inflation and the Iran Hostage Crisis of 1979–1980 took their toll, resulting in a landslide victory for Republican presidential nominee Ronald Reagan in 1980, which shifted the political landscape in favor of the Republicans for years to come. The influx of conservative Democrats into the Republican Party is often cited as a reason for the Republican Party's shift further to the right during the late 20th century as well as the shift of its base from the Northeast and Midwest to the South.

==== 1990s and Third Way centrism ====
Bill Clinton, the 42nd president (1993–2001)

With the ascendancy of the Republicans under Ronald Reagan, the Democrats searched for ways to respond yet were unable to succeed by running traditional candidates, such as former vice president and Democratic presidential nominee Walter Mondale and Massachusetts governor Michael Dukakis, who lost to Reagan and George H. W. Bush in the 1984 and 1988 presidential elections, respectively. Many Democrats attached their hopes to the future star of Gary Hart, who had challenged Mondale in the 1984 primaries running on a theme of "New Ideas"; and in the subsequent 1988 primaries became the de facto front-runner and virtual "shoo-in" for the Democratic presidential nomination before a sex scandal ended his campaign. The party nevertheless began to seek out a younger generation of leaders, who like Hart had been inspired by the pragmatic idealism of John F. Kennedy.

Arkansas governor Bill Clinton was one such figure, who was elected president in 1992 as the Democratic nominee. The Democratic Leadership Council was a campaign organization connected to Clinton that advocated a realignment and triangulation under the re-branded "New Democrat" label. The party adopted a synthesis of neoliberal economic policies with cultural liberalism, with the voter base after Reagan having shifted considerably to the right. In an effort to appeal both to liberals and to fiscal conservatives, Democrats began to advocate for a balanced budget and market economy tempered by government intervention (mixed economy), along with a continued emphasis on social justice and affirmative action. The economic policy adopted by the Democratic Party, including the former Clinton administration, has been referred to as "Third Way".

The Democrats lost control of Congress in the 1994 elections to the Republicans. However, in 1996, Clinton was re-elected; he was the first Democratic president since Franklin D. Roosevelt to win a second full term. In December 1998, Republicans in the House of Representatives impeached Clinton for his role in the Clinton–Lewinsky scandal, but was acquitted by the Senate in February 1999. Clinton's vice president Al Gore ran to succeed him as president, and won the popular vote, but after a controversial election dispute over a Florida recount settled by the U.S. Supreme Court (which ruled 5–4 in favor of Bush), he lost the 2000 election to Republican opponent George W. Bush in the Electoral College.

=== 21st century ===
Barack Obama, the 44th president (2009–2017)

In the wake of the September 11 attacks and the growing concern over global warming, some of the party's key issues in the early 21st century have included combating terrorism while preserving human rights, expanding access to health care, labor rights, and environmental protection.

In the 2006 elections, Democrats regained majority control of both the House and the Senate, and in 2008, Barack Obama won the Democratic Party's nomination and was elected as the first African-American president. Under the Obama presidency, the party moved forward with reforms including an economic stimulus package, the Dodd–Frank financial reform act, and, in its biggest impact, reshaped U.S. healthcare with the Affordable Care Act.

==== 2000s–2010s and the Obama era ====
In the 2010 midterm elections, the Democratic Party lost control of the House as well as its majorities in several state legislatures and governorships. The 2010 elections also marked the end of the Democratic Party's electoral dominance in the Southern United States.

In the 2012 elections, President Obama was re-elected, but the party remained in the minority in the House of Representatives and lost control of the Senate in the 2014 midterm elections. After the 2016 election of Donald Trump, who lost the popular vote to Democratic nominee Hillary Clinton, the Democratic Party transitioned into the role of an opposition party and held neither the presidency nor Congress for two years. However, the party won back the House in the 2018 midterm elections under the leadership of Nancy Pelosi.

Democrats were extremely critical of President Trump, particularly his policies on immigration, healthcare, as well as his response to the COVID-19 pandemic. In December 2019, Democrats in the House of Representatives impeached Trump, although he was acquitted in the Republican-controlled Senate.

==== 2020s and opposition to Trumpism ====
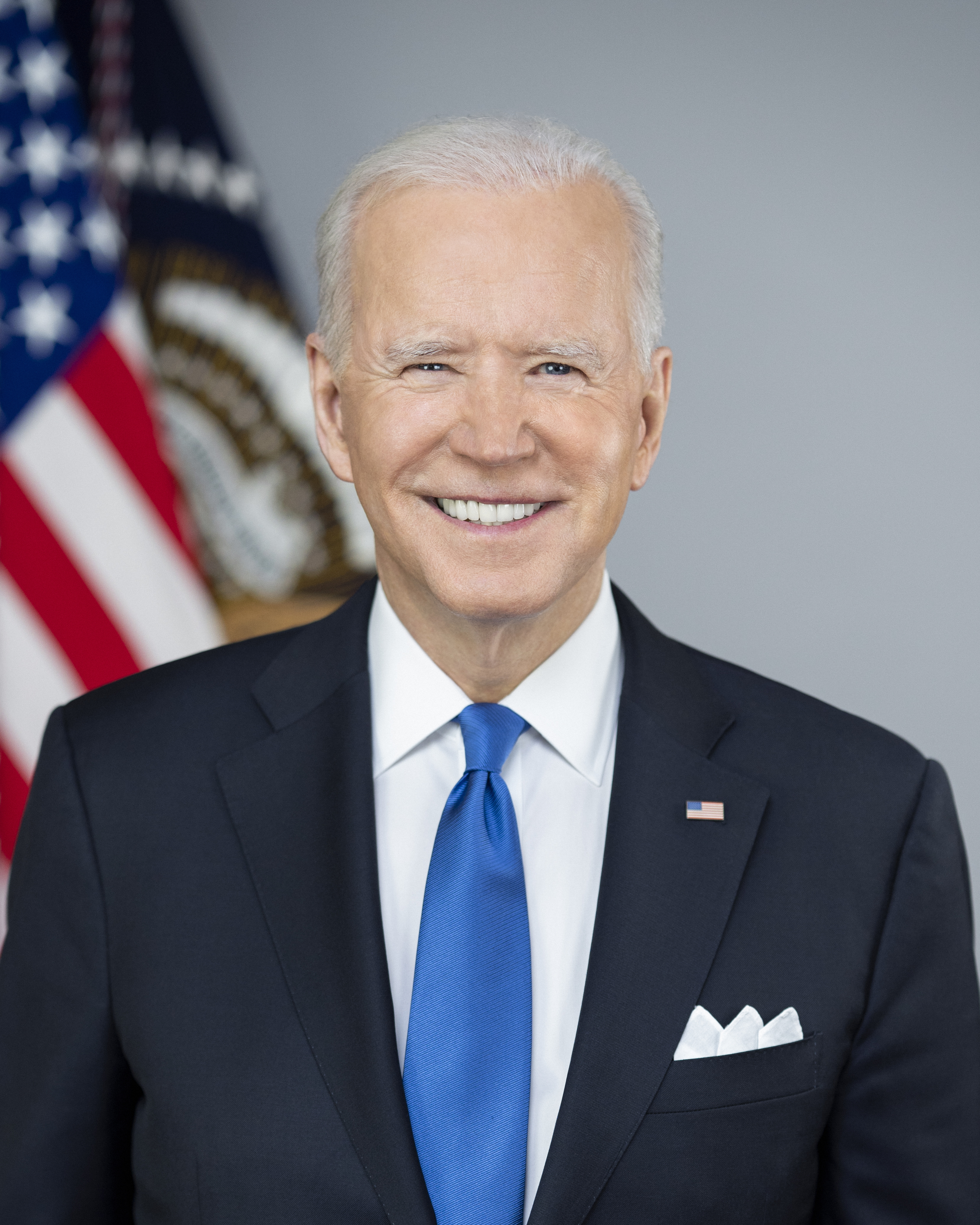
Joe Biden, the 46th president (2021–2025)

In November 2020, Democratic candidate Joe Biden defeated Trump to win the 2020 presidential election. Biden's running mate, Kamala Harris, was the first female and person of African and South Asian descent to become vice president in history. He began his term with extremely narrow Democratic majorities in the U.S. House and Senate. During the Biden presidency, the party was characterized as adopting an increasingly progressive economic agenda. In 2022, Biden appointed Ketanji Brown Jackson, the first black woman on the Supreme Court. However, she was replacing liberal justice Stephen Breyer, thus she did not alter the court's 6–3 split between conservatives (the majority) and liberals. After Dobbs v. Jackson (decided June 24, 2022), which led to abortion bans in much of the country, the Democratic Party rallied behind abortion rights.

In the 2022 midterm elections, Democrats dramatically outperformed historical trends and a widely anticipated red wave did not materialize. The party only narrowly lost its majority in the U.S. House and expanded its majority in the U.S. Senate, along with several gains at the state level.

In July 2024, after a series of age and health concerns, Biden withdrew from the presidential election, becoming the first incumbent president since Lyndon B. Johnson in 1968 to withdraw from running for reelection, the first since the 19th century to withdraw after serving only one term, (Note: All three incumbents in the 20th century to withdraw or not seek reelection—Calvin Coolidge, Harry S. Truman, and Lyndon B. Johnson—had succeeded to the presidency when their predecessor died, then won a second term in their own right. Three presidents in the 1800s made and kept pledges to serve only one term, most recently Rutherford B. Hayes.) and the only one to ever withdraw after already winning the primaries.

Vice President Kamala Harris—who became Biden's replacement on the ballot after his withdrawal from the race—became the first black woman to be nominated by a major party, but she was defeated in the 2024 election by Donald Trump. Harris lost the electoral college 312–226 (including all seven of the anticipated swing states) as well as the popular vote, becoming the first Democratic candidate to do so since John Kerry in 2004, amid what was a global anti-incumbent backlash.

==== Current status ====
As of 2026, Democrats hold 24 state governorships, 17 state legislatures, 16 state government trifectas, and the mayorships in the majority of the country's major cities. Three of the nine current U.S. Supreme Court justices were appointed by Democratic presidents. By registered members, the Democratic Party is the largest party in the U.S. and the third largest in the world. All totaled, 16 Democrats have served as president of the United States.

== Name and symbols ==
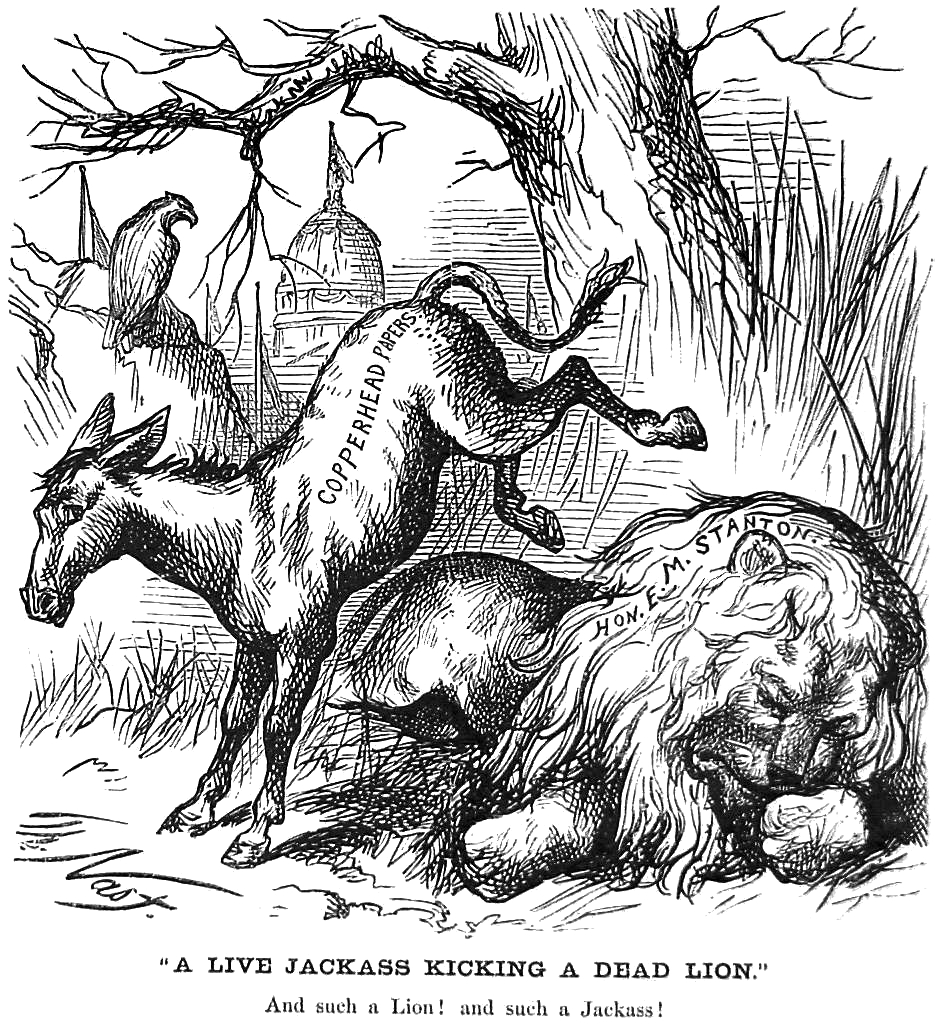
"A Live Jackass Kicking a Dead Lion" by Thomas Nast, Harper's Weekly, January 19, 1870.

The donkey party logo remains a well-known symbol for the Democratic Party despite not being the official logo of the party.

In use since 2010, the letter "D" enclosed in a circle has been one of the Democratic Party's main symbols.

The Democratic-Republican Party splintered in 1824 into the short-lived National Republican Party and the Jacksonian movement which in 1828 became the Democratic Party. During the Jacksonian era, the term "The Democracy" was in use by the party, but the name "Democratic Party" was eventually settled upon and became the official name in 1844. Members of the party are called "Democrats" or "Dems".

The most common mascot symbol for the party has been the donkey, or jackass. Andrew Jackson's enemies twisted his name to "jackass" as a term of ridicule regarding a stupid and stubborn animal. However, the Democrats liked the common-man implications and picked it up too, therefore the image persisted and evolved. Its most lasting impression came from the cartoons of Thomas Nast from 1870 in Harper's Weekly. Cartoonists followed Nast and used the donkey to represent the Democrats and the elephant to represent the Republicans.

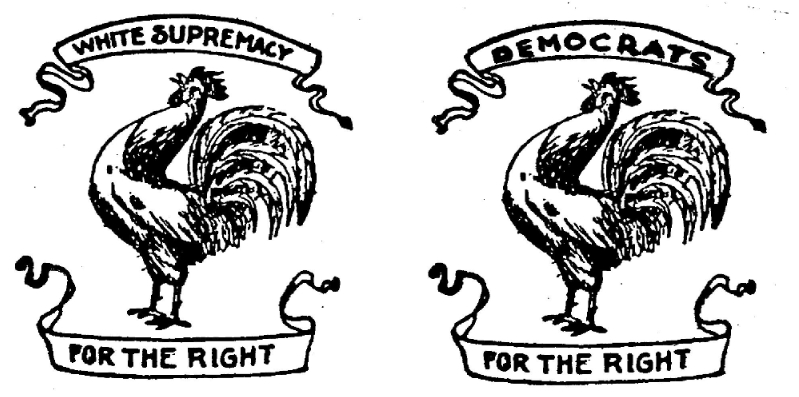
In many states, the logo of the Democratic Party was a rooster, for instance, in Alabama: Logo of the Alabama Democratic Party, 1904–1966 (left) and 1966–1996 (right).

In the early 20th century, the traditional symbol of the Democratic Party in Indiana, Kentucky, Oklahoma, and Ohio was the rooster, as opposed to the Republican eagle. The rooster was also adopted as an official symbol of the national Democratic Party. In 1904, the Alabama Democratic Party chose, as the logo to put on its ballots, a rooster with the motto "White supremacy – For the right." The words "White supremacy" were replaced with "Democrats" in 1966. In 1996, the Alabama Democratic Party dropped the rooster, citing racist and white supremacist connotations linked with the symbol. The rooster symbol still appears on Oklahoma, Kentucky, Indiana, and West Virginia ballots. In New York, the Democratic ballot symbol is a five-pointed star.

Although both major political parties (and many minor ones) use the traditional American colors of red, white, and blue in their marketing and representations, since the election night 2000 blue has become the identifying color for the Democratic Party while red has become the identifying color for the Republican Party. That night, for the first time all major broadcast television networks used the same color scheme for the electoral map: blue states for Al Gore (Democratic nominee) and red states for George W. Bush (Republican nominee). Since then, the color blue has been widely used by the media to represent the party. This is contrary to common practice outside of the United States where blue is the traditional color of the right and red the color of the left.

In 2010, the party introduced a new logo, with a blue capital "D" enclosed in a blue circle. It remained the party's primary brand mark, with minor changes to the shade of blue, for 15 years. In 2025, a new logo was introduced, which incorporates a white donkey facing to the right instead of the left, with three blue stars in the center instead of four, on a blue background.

Jefferson-Jackson Day is the annual fundraising event (dinner) held by Democratic Party organizations across the United States. It is named after presidents Thomas Jefferson and Andrew Jackson, whom the party regards as its distinguished early leaders.

The song "Happy Days Are Here Again" is the unofficial song of the Democratic Party. It was used prominently when Franklin D. Roosevelt was nominated for president at the 1932 Democratic National Convention and remains a sentimental favorite for Democrats. For example, Paul Shaffer played the theme on the Late Show with David Letterman after the Democrats won Congress in 2006. "Don't Stop" by Fleetwood Mac was adopted by Bill Clinton's presidential campaign in 1992 and has endured as a popular Democratic song. The emotionally similar song "Beautiful Day" by the band U2 has also become a favorite theme song for Democratic candidates. John Kerry used the song during his 2004 presidential campaign and several Democratic congressional candidates used it as a celebratory tune in 2006.

As a traditional anthem for its presidential nominating convention, Aaron Copland's "Fanfare for the Common Man" was performed at the beginning of the 1976 Democratic National Convention.

== Structure ==
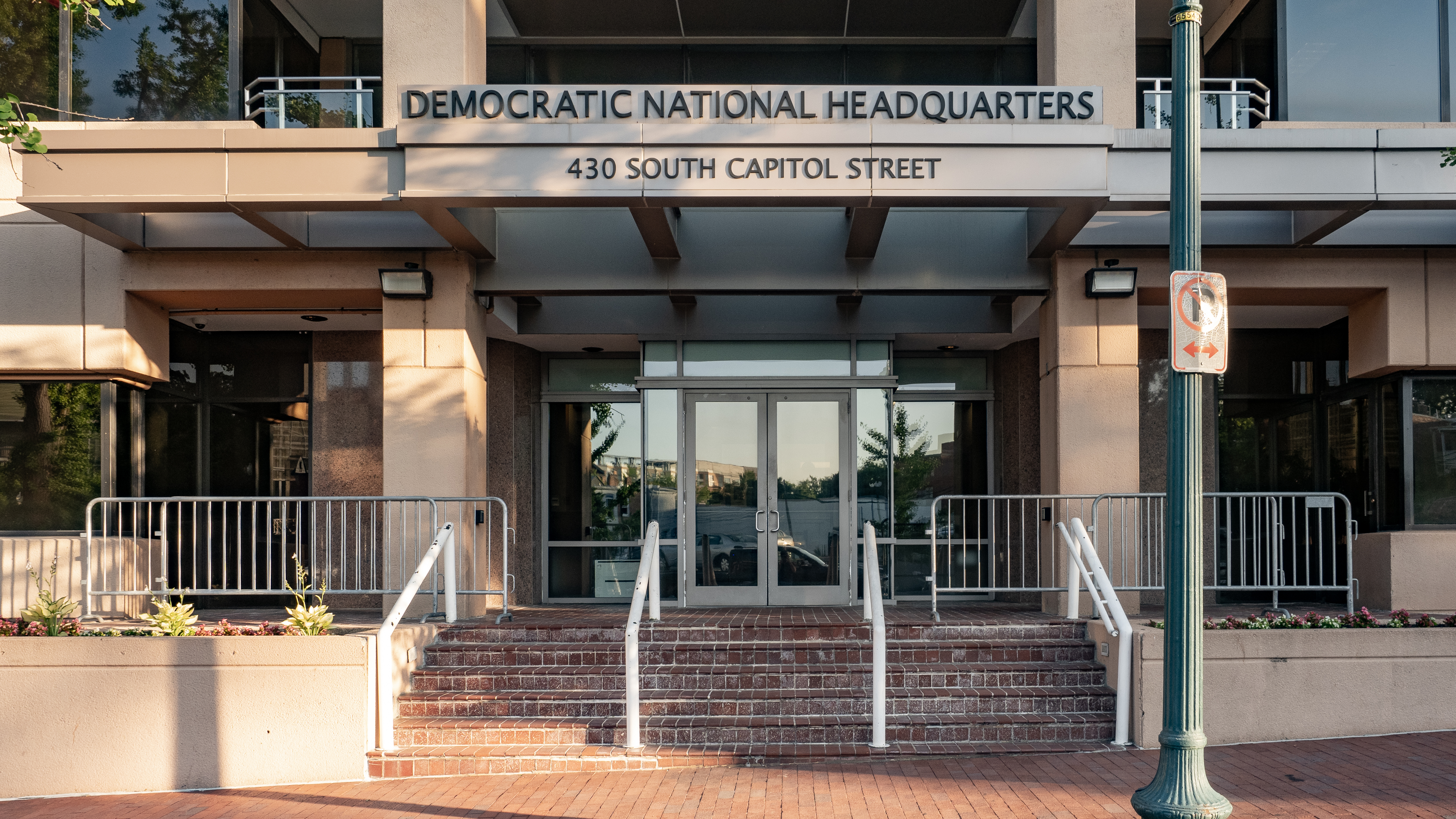
Democratic National Headquarters (2024)

=== National committee ===
The Democratic National Committee (DNC) is responsible for promoting Democratic campaign activities. While the DNC is responsible for overseeing the process of writing the Democratic Platform, the DNC is more focused on campaign and organizational strategy than public policy. In presidential elections, it supervises the Democratic National Convention. The national convention is subject to the charter of the party and the ultimate authority within the Democratic Party when it is in session, with the DNC running the party's organization at other times. Since February 1, 2025, the DNC has been chaired by Ken Martin.

=== State parties ===
Each state also has a state committee, made up of elected committee members as well as ex officio committee members (usually elected officials and representatives of major constituencies), which in turn elects a chair. County, town, city, and ward committees are generally composed of individuals elected at the local level, or in some cases, a hybrid model where some members are elected and others are appointed from within the committee. State and local committees often coordinate campaign activities within their jurisdiction, oversee local conventions, and in some cases primaries or caucuses, and may have a role in nominating candidates for elected office under state law. Rarely do they have much direct funding, but in 2005 DNC Chairman Dean began a program (called the "50 State Strategy") of using DNC national funds to assist all state parties and pay for full-time professional staffers.

In addition, state-level party committees operate in the territories of American Samoa, Guam, and Virgin Islands, the commonwealths of Northern Mariana Islands and Puerto Rico, and the District of Columbia, with all but Puerto Rico being active in nominating candidates for both presidential and territorial contests, while Puerto Rico's Democratic Party is organized only to nominate presidential candidates. The Democrats Abroad committee is organized by American voters who reside outside of U.S. territory to nominate presidential candidates. All such party committees are accorded recognition as state parties and are allowed to elect both members to the National Committee as well as delegates to the National Convention.

=== Major party committees and groups ===
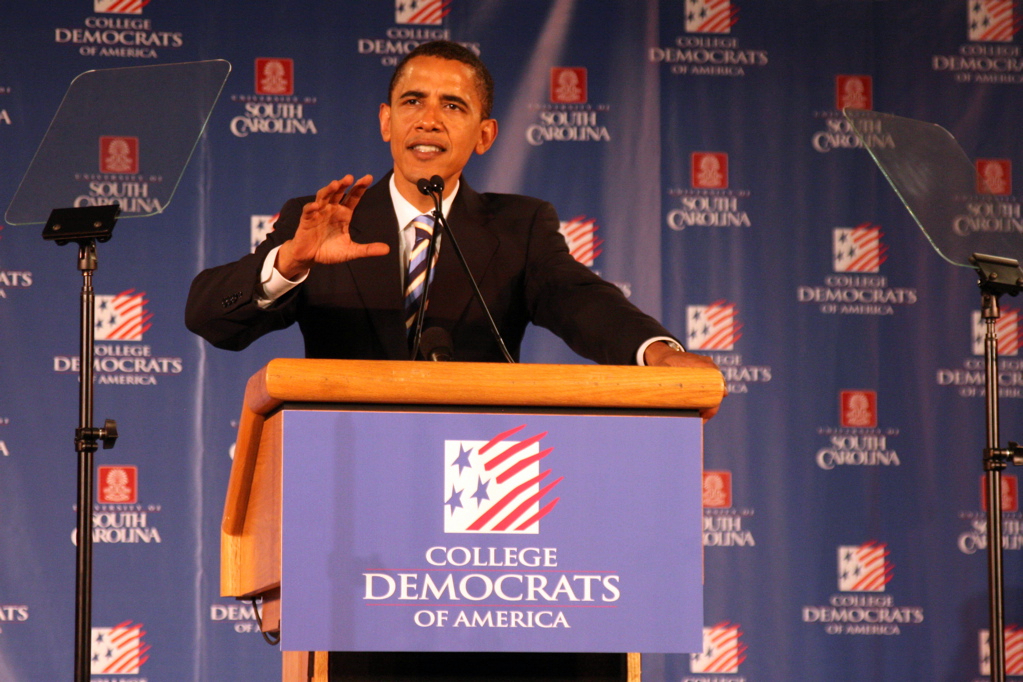
Then-Senator Obama speaking to College Democrats of America in 2007.

The Democratic Congressional Campaign Committee (DCCC) assists party candidates in House races and is chaired by Representative Suzan DelBene of Washington. Similarly, the Democratic Senatorial Campaign Committee (DSCC), chaired by Senator Gary Peters of Michigan, raises funds for Senate races. The Democratic Legislative Campaign Committee (DLCC), chaired by Majority Leader of the New York State Senate Andrea Stewart-Cousins, is a smaller organization that focuses on state legislative races. The Democratic Governors Association (DGA) is an organization supporting the candidacies of Democratic gubernatorial nominees and incumbents. Likewise, the mayors of the largest cities and urban centers convene as the National Conference of Democratic Mayors.

The DNC sponsors the College Democrats of America (CDA), a student-outreach organization with the goal of training and engaging a new generation of Democratic activists. Democrats Abroad is the organization for Americans living outside the United States. They work to advance the party's goals and encourage Americans living abroad to support the Democrats. The Young Democrats of America (YDA) and the High School Democrats of America (HSDA) are young adult and youth-led organizations respectively that attempt to draw in and mobilize young people for Democratic candidates but operate outside of the DNC.

== Political positions ==
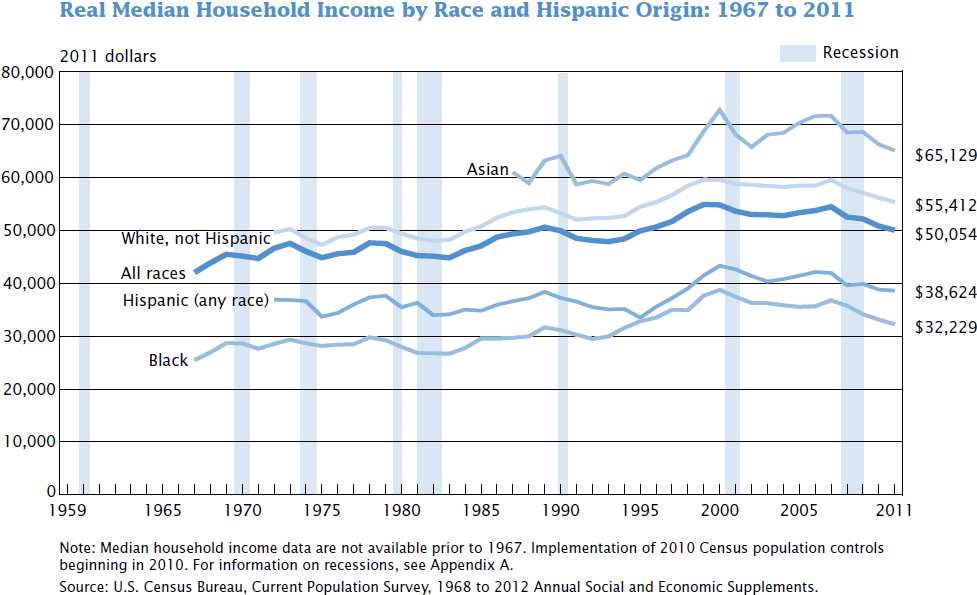
This graph shows the real median U.S. household income by race: 1967 to 2011, in 2011 dollars.

The Democratic Party is widely described in American sources as either a centrist or a center-left political party. In international comparisons, some have observed that the party's platform is most similar to center and center-left parties such as the Social Democratic Party of Germany, Renaissance in France, or the Liberal Democrats and the Labour Party in the United Kingdom. The party also contains distinct left-wing subgroups (such as the "Squad") alongside more moderate coalitions within its broad electoral coalition. Political scientists Robert C. Sinclair and R. Jeffrey Melton described the Democratic Party as "slightly to the right of the largest Canadian party, the center-left Liberal Party".

The 21st-century Democratic Party is unique and differs from other parties of similar profile in its ideological orientation, in part due to its heterogenous demographic composition. In particular, the Democratic Party's ideology derives from being supported by both racial minorities, particularly African Americans, as well as white voters with high educational attainment. Ideologically, the Democratic Party is more diverse than the Republican Party, according to data collected by Gallup.

Its voting demographics are heavily educationally and racially polarized, but not income polarized. The Democratic Party is weakest among white voters without college degrees and white evangelicals in the 21st century. Higher educational attainment is strongly correlated with higher income and wealth, and also strongly correlated with increased ideological support for the Democratic Party's positions among white voters.

This derives in part from unique regional characteristics of the United States, particularly the Southern United States. Racial polarization is extremely high in the Southern United States, with black Southerners almost entirely voting for the Democratic Party, and white Southerners almost entirely voting for the Republican Party. Also, white Southerners with college degrees are strongly Republican, unlike in most of the rest of the country. African Americans continue to have the lowest incomes of any racial group in the United States.

The Democratic Party's contemporary liberalism has its origins in the Puritans of New England, with their emphasis on education and science dating back to the colonial era and the Scientific Revolution. This liberalism is older than the classical liberalism or social democracy of the 19th century.

The Democratic Party's social positions derive in part from those of the New Left, that is cultural liberalism. These include feminism, LGBTQ rights, drug policy reforms, and environmentalism. The party's platform favors a generous welfare state and a greater measure of social and economic equality. On social issues, it advocates for the continued legality of abortion, the legalization of marijuana, a pathway to citizenship for undocumented immigrants, and LGBTQ rights.

=== Economic issues ===
The social safety net and strong labor unions have been at the heart of Democratic economic policy since the New Deal in the 1930s. The Democratic Party's economic policy positions, as measured by votes in Congress, tend to align with those of the middle class. The party has generally opposed tariffs and favored free trade throughout its history. However, according to the Republican-aligned American Action Forum, the party has moved in favor of protectionist policies since the 2020s.

Democrats support a progressive tax system, higher minimum wages, equal opportunity employment, Social Security, universal health care, public education, and subsidized housing. They also support infrastructure development and clean energy investments to achieve economic development and job creation.

Throughout the 1970s and 1990s, the party has at times supported "Third Way" centrist economic reforms that cut the size of government and reduced market regulations, as seen through the policies of presidents Jimmy Carter and Bill Clinton. The party has generally rejected both laissez-faire economics and market socialism, instead favoring Keynesian economics within a regulated capitalist market-based system. It broadly opposes right-to-work legislation and supports pro-union laws such as the Protecting the Right to Organize Act, and favors increasing the minimum wage to at least $15 per hour.

However, the party is not social democratic and does not base its policies on organized labor. Since the 2020s, it has also been distancing itself from predistributive economic policies such as job guarantees, minimum wage increases, and pro-union legislation.

==== Fiscal policy ====
Democrats support a more progressive tax structure to provide more services and reduce economic inequality by making sure that the wealthiest Americans pay more in taxes. Democrats and Republicans traditionally take differing stances on eradicating poverty. Brady said "Our poverty level is the direct consequence of our weak social policies, which are a direct consequence of weak political actors". They oppose the cutting of social services, such as Social Security, Medicare, and Medicaid, believing it to be harmful to efficiency and social justice. Democrats believe the benefits of social services in monetary and non-monetary terms are a more productive labor force and cultured population and believe that the benefits of this are greater than any benefits that could be derived from lower taxes, especially on top earners, or cuts to social services. Furthermore, Democrats see social services as essential toward providing positive freedom, freedom derived from economic opportunity. The Democratic-led House of Representatives reinstated the PAYGO (pay-as-you-go) budget rule at the start of the 110th Congress.

==== Minimum wage ====
The Democratic Party favors raising the minimum wage. The Fair Minimum Wage Act of 2007 was an early component of the Democrats' agenda during the 110th Congress. In 2006, the Democrats supported six state-ballot initiatives to increase the minimum wage and all six initiatives passed.

In 2017, Senate Democrats introduced the Raise the Wage Act which would raise the minimum wage to $15 an hour by 2024. In 2021, Democratic president Joe Biden proposed increasing the minimum wage to $15 by 2025. In many states with Democratic legislative and gubernatorial control, the state minimum wage has been increased to a rate above the federal minimum wage, usually to $15 per hour or higher.

==== Health care ====
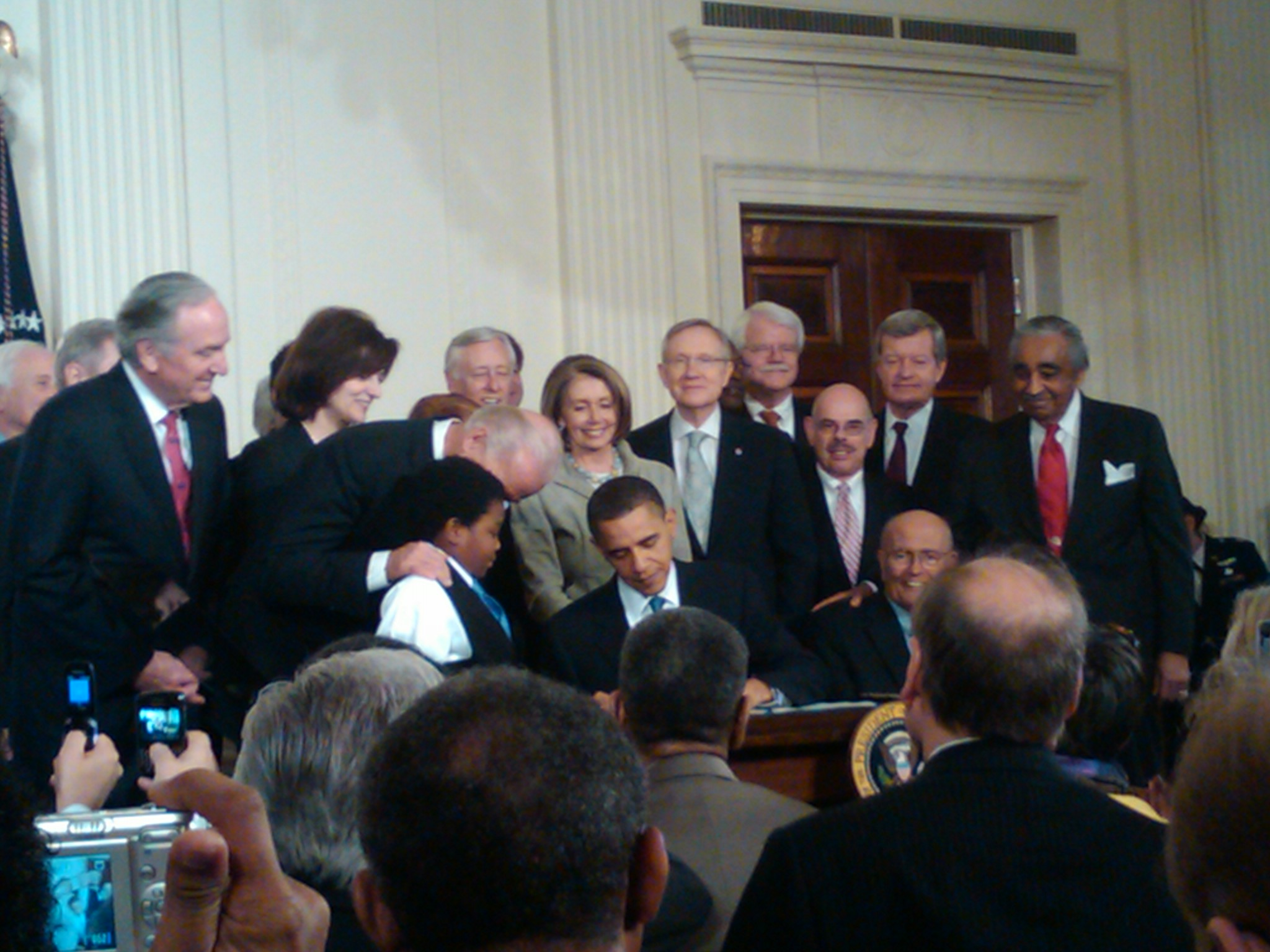
President Obama signing the Affordable Care Act into law in 2010.

Democrats call for "affordable and quality health care" and favor moving toward universal health care in a variety of forms to address rising healthcare costs. Progressive Democratic politicians favor a single-payer program or Medicare for All, while liberals prefer creating a public health insurance option.

The Affordable Care Act, signed into law by President Barack Obama on March 23, 2010, has been one of the most significant pushes for universal health care. As of December 2019, more than 20 million Americans have gained health insurance under the Affordable Care Act.

==== Education ====
Democrats favor improving public education by raising school standards and reforming the Head Start program. They also support universal preschool, expanding access to primary education, including through charter schools, and are generally opposed to school voucher programs. They call for addressing student loan debt and reforms to reduce college tuition. Other proposals have included tuition-free public universities and reform of standardized testing. Democrats have the long-term aim of having publicly funded college education with low tuition fees (like in much of Europe and Canada), which would be available to every eligible American student. Alternatively, they encourage expanding access to post-secondary education by increasing state funding for student financial aid such as Pell Grants and college tuition tax deductions.

==== Environment ====
Democrats and Republicans have diverged on the seriousness of the threat posed by climate change, with Democrats' assessment rising significantly in the mid-2010s.

The sharp divide over the existence of and responsibility for global warming and climate change falls largely along political lines. Overall, 60% of those surveyed said oil and gas companies were "completely or mostly responsible" for climate change.

Opinion about human causation of climate change increased substantially with education among Democrats, but not among Republicans. Conversely, opinions favoring becoming carbon neutral declined substantially with age among Republicans, but not among Democrats.

A broad range of policies to reduce greenhouse gas emissions has been proposed. Democrats' support for such policies consistently exceeds that of Republicans.

Acceptance of wind and solar facilities in one's community is stronger among Democrats (blue), while acceptance of nuclear power plants is stronger among Republicans (red).

Democrats believe that the government should protect the environment and have a history of environmentalism. In more recent years, this stance has emphasized renewable energy generation as the basis for an improved economy, greater national security, and general environmental benefits. The Democratic Party is substantially more likely than the Republican Party to support environmental regulation and policies that are supportive of renewable energy.

The Democratic Party also favors expansion of conservation lands and encourages open space and rail travel to relieve highway and airport congestion and improve air quality and the economy as it "believe[s] that communities, environmental interests, and the government should work together to protect resources while ensuring the vitality of local economies. Once Americans were led to believe they had to make a choice between the economy and the environment. They now know this is a false choice."

The foremost environmental concern of the Democratic Party is climate change. Democrats, most notably former vice president Al Gore, have pressed for stern regulation of greenhouse gases. On October 15, 2007, Gore won the Nobel Peace Prize for his efforts to build greater knowledge about man-made climate change and lay the foundations for the measures needed to counteract it.

==== Renewable energy and fossil fuels ====
Democrats have supported increased domestic renewable energy development, including wind and solar power farms, in an effort to reduce carbon pollution. The party's platform calls for an "all of the above" energy policy including clean energy, natural gas, and domestic oil, with the desire of becoming energy independent. The party has supported higher taxes on oil companies and increased regulations on coal power plants, favoring a policy of reducing long-term reliance on fossil fuels. Additionally, the party supports stricter fuel emissions standards to prevent air pollution.

During his presidency, Joe Biden enacted the Inflation Reduction Act of 2022, which is the largest allocation of funds for addressing climate change in the history of the United States.

==== Trade ====
Like the Republican Party, the Democratic Party has taken widely varying views on international trade throughout its history. The Democratic Party has usually been more supportive of free trade than the Republican Party.

The Democrats dominated the Second Party System and set low tariffs designed to pay for the government but not protect industry. Their opponents, the Whigs, wanted high protective tariffs but usually were outvoted in Congress. Tariffs soon became a major political issue as the Whigs (1832–1852) and (after 1854) the Republicans wanted to protect their mostly Northern industries and constituents by voting for higher tariffs and the Southern Democrats, which had very little industry but imported many goods voted for lower tariffs. After the Second Party System ended in 1854, the Democrats lost control and the new Republican Party had its opportunity to raise rates.

During the Third Party System, Democratic president Grover Cleveland made low tariffs the centerpiece of Democratic Party policies, arguing that high tariffs were an unnecessary and unfair tax on consumers. The South and West generally supported low tariffs, while the industrial North supported high tariffs. During the Fourth Party System, Democratic president Woodrow Wilson made a drastic lowering of tariff rates a major priority for his presidency. The 1913 Underwood Tariff cut rates, and the new revenues generated by the federal income tax made tariffs much less important in terms of economic impact and political rhetoric.

During the Fifth Party System, the Reciprocal Tariff Act of 1934 was enacted during FDR's administration, marking a sharp departure from the era of protectionism in the United States. American duties on foreign products declined from an average of 46% in 1934 to 12% by 1962. After World War II, the U.S. promoted the General Agreement on Tariffs and Trade (GATT) established in 1947 during the Truman administration, to minimize tariffs liberalize trade among all capitalist countries.

In the 1990s, the Clinton administration and several prominent Democrats pushed through several agreements such as the North American Free Trade Agreement (NAFTA). Barack Obama signed several free trade agreements during his presidency while Joe Biden did not sign any free trade agreements during his presidency and increased some tariffs on China.

During Republican Donald Trump's two terms as president, the Democratic Party has been more in favor of free trade than the Republican Party. The Democratic Party remains supportive of the USMCA free trade agreement with Mexico and Canada.

=== Social issues ===
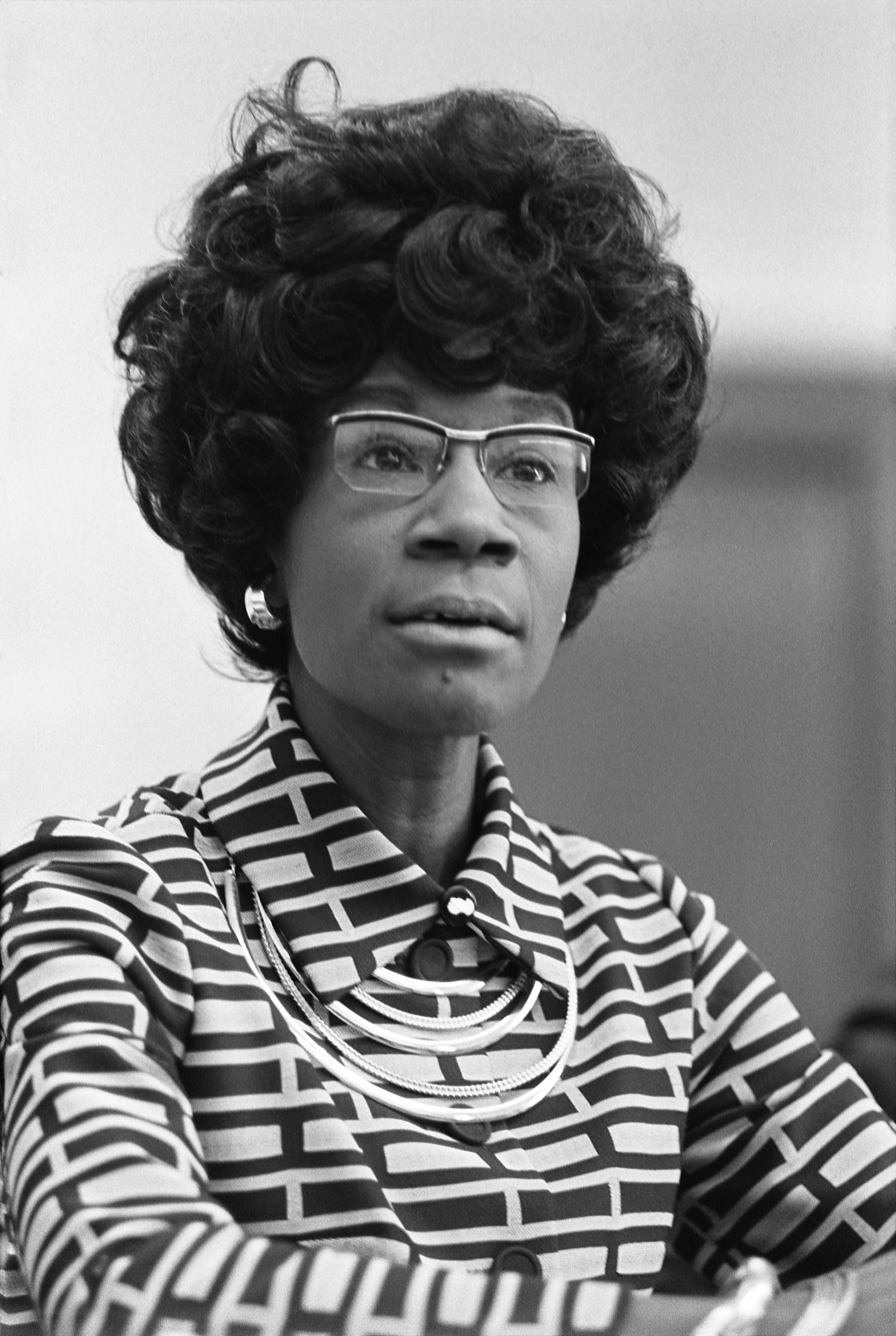
Shirley Chisholm was the first black candidate for a major-party nomination for President of the United States.

The modern Democratic Party emphasizes social equality and equal opportunity. Democrats support voting rights and minority rights, including LGBT rights. Democratic president Lyndon B. Johnson signed the Civil Rights Act of 1964, which outlawed racial segregation. Carmines and Stimson wrote "the Democratic Party appropriated racial liberalism and assumed federal responsibility for ending racial discrimination."

Ideological social elements in the party include cultural liberalism, civil libertarianism, and feminism. Some Democratic social policies are immigration reform, electoral reform, and women's reproductive rights.

==== Equal opportunity ====
The Democratic Party is a staunch supporter of equal opportunity for all Americans regardless of sex, age, race, ethnicity, sexual orientation, gender identity, religion, creed, or national origin. The Democratic Party has broad appeal across most socioeconomic and ethnic demographics, as seen in recent exit polls. Democrats also strongly support the Americans with Disabilities Act to prohibit discrimination against people based on physical or mental disability. As such, the Democrats pushed as well the ADA Amendments Act of 2008, a disability rights expansion that became law.

Most Democrats support affirmative action to further equal opportunity. However, in 2020 57% voters in California voted to keep their state constitution's ban on affirmative action, despite Biden winning 63% of the vote in California in the same election.

==== Voting rights ====
The party is very supportive of improving "voting rights" as well as election accuracy and accessibility. They support extensions of voting time, including making election day a holiday. They support reforming the electoral system to eliminate gerrymandering, abolishing the electoral college, as well as passing comprehensive campaign finance reform.

==== Abortion and reproductive rights ====
The Democratic position on abortion has changed significantly over time. During the late 1960s and early 1970s, Republicans generally favored legalized abortion more than Democrats, although significant heterogeneity could be found within both parties. During this time, opposition to abortion tended to be concentrated within the political left in the United States. Liberal Protestants and Catholics (many of whom were Democratic voters) opposed abortion, while most conservative Protestants supported legal access to abortion services.

In its national platforms from 1992 to 2004, the Democratic Party has called for abortion to be "safe, legal and rare"—namely, keeping it legal by rejecting laws that allow governmental interference in abortion decisions and reducing the number of abortions by promoting both knowledge of reproduction and contraception and incentives for adoption. When Congress voted on the Partial-Birth Abortion Ban Act in 2003, congressional Democrats were split, with a minority (including former Senate majority leader Harry Reid) supporting the ban and the majority of Democrats opposing the legislation.

According to the 2020 Democratic Party platform, "Democrats believe every woman should be able to access high-quality reproductive health care services, including safe and legal abortion."

After Roe v. Wade (1973) was overturned in Dobbs v. Jackson Women's Health Organization (2022), Democratic-controlled states and ballot initiatives were able to ensure access to abortion. The number of abortions in the United States increased after Dobbs, due to the right to travel between states.

==== Immigration ====
Apprehensions at the southwest border since 2001.

Like the Republican Party, the Democratic Party has taken widely varying views on immigration throughout its history. Since the 1990s, the Democratic Party has been more supportive overall of immigration than the Republican Party. Many Democratic politicians have called for systematic reform of the immigration system such that residents that have come into the United States illegally have a pathway to legal citizenship. President Obama remarked in November 2013 that he felt it was "long past time to fix our broken immigration system," particularly to allow "incredibly bright young people" who came over as students to become full citizens. In 2013, Democrats in the Senate passed S. 744, which would reform immigration policy to allow citizenship for illegal immigrants in the United States. The law failed to pass in the House and was never re-introduced after the 113th Congress.

Opposition to illegal immigration has increased in the 2020s amidst a massive increase in the amount of illegal border crossings, with a majority of Democrats supporting increasing border security.

==== LGBTQ rights ====
The Democratic position on LGBTQ rights has changed significantly over time. Before the 2000s, like the Republicans, the Democratic Party often took positions hostile to LGBTQ rights. As of the 2020s, both voters and elected representatives within the Democratic Party are overwhelmingly supportive of LGBT rights.

Support for same-sex marriage has steadily increased among the general public, including voters in both major parties, since the start of the 21st century. An April 2009 ABC News/Washington Post public opinion poll put support among Democrats at 62%. A 2006 Pew Research Center poll of Democrats found that 55% supported gays adopting children with 40% opposed while 70% support gays in the military, with only 23% opposed. Gallup polling from May 2009 stated that 82% of Democrats support open enlistment. A 2023 Gallup public opinion poll found 84% of Democrats support same-sex marriage, compared to 71% support by the general public and 49% support by Republicans.

The 2004 Democratic National Platform stated that marriage should be defined at the state level and it repudiated the Federal Marriage Amendment. John Kerry, the Democratic presidential nominee in 2004, did not support same-sex marriage in his campaign. While not stating support of same-sex marriage, the 2008 platform called for repeal of the Defense of Marriage Act, which banned federal recognition of same-sex marriage and removed the need for interstate recognition, supported antidiscrimination laws and the extension of hate crime laws to LGBTQ people and opposed "don't ask, don't tell". The 2012 platform included support for same-sex marriage and for the repeal of DOMA.

On May 9, 2012, Barack Obama became the first sitting president to say he supports same-sex marriage. Previously, he had opposed restrictions on same-sex marriage such as the Defense of Marriage Act, which he promised to repeal, California's Prop 8, and a constitutional amendment to ban same-sex marriage (which he opposed, saying that "decisions about marriage should be left to the states as they always have been"), but also stated that he personally believed marriage to be between a man and a woman and that he favored civil unions that would "give same-sex couples equal legal rights and privileges as married couples". Earlier, when running for the Illinois Senate in 1996 he said, "I favor legalizing same-sex marriages, and would fight efforts to prohibit such marriages". Former presidents Bill Clinton and Jimmy Carter along with former Democratic presidential nominees Al Gore and Michael Dukakis support same-sex marriage. President Joe Biden has supported same-sex marriage since 2012, when he became the highest-ranking government official to support it. In 2022, Biden signed the Respect for Marriage Act; the law repealed the Defense of Marriage Act, which Biden had voted for during his Senate tenure.

==== Status of Puerto Rico and D.C. ====
The 2016 Democratic Party platform promised debt restructuring for the Puerto Rican government, Puerto Rican participation in presidential elections, and a system of government self-determined by Puerto Ricans insofar as it complies with national laws. The platform also proposes statehood for the District of Columbia.

=== Legal issues ===
==== Gun control ====
U.S. opinion on gun control issues is deeply divided along political lines, as shown in this 2021 survey.

With a stated goal of reducing crime and homicide, the Democratic Party has introduced various gun control measures, most notably the Gun Control Act of 1968, the Brady Bill of 1993 and the Violent Crime Control and Law Enforcement Act (1994). In its national platform for 2008, the only statement explicitly favoring gun control was a plan calling for renewal of the 1994 Assault Weapons Ban. In 2022, Democratic president Joe Biden signed the Bipartisan Safer Communities Act, which, among other things, expanded background checks and provided incentives for states to pass red flag laws.

The Democratic Party does not oppose gun ownership. According to a 2023 Pew Research Center poll, 20% of Democrats owned firearms, compared to 32% of the general public and 45% of Republicans.

==== Death penalty ====
The Democratic position on capital punishment has shifted multiple times over the decades. In 1968, Attorney General Ramsey Clark, representing the Johnson Administration, asked Congress to abolish the federal death penalty. In 1972, the Democratic Party platform called for the abolition of capital punishment. In 1988, Democratic presidential nominee Michael Dukakis's statement in the 1988 United States presidential debates that he would oppose the death penalty even if his wife were raped and murdered was seen by many viewers as callous and emotionless, and was widely viewed as having contributed to his loss to George H. W. Bush in the general election.

During his presidential campaign, Bill Clinton sought to distance himself from his party's left flank through his strong support for the death penalty, including by personally supervising the execution of Ricky Ray Rector, a lobotomized African-American man convicted of killing a police officer. During Clinton's presidency, Democrats led the expansion of the federal death penalty. These efforts were manifested in the 1994 Violent Crime Control and Law Enforcement Act, which expanded the federal death penalty to around 60 offenses, and the Antiterrorism and Effective Death Penalty Act of 1996, which heavily limited appeals in death penalty cases. The Democratic Party platforms of 1996 and 2000 supported capital punishment outright, while the Democratic Party platforms of 2008 and 2012 warned against arbitrary application and the execution of innocents.

In June 2016, the Democratic Platform Drafting Committee unanimously adopted an amendment to abolish the death penalty. The 2020 Democratic Party platform reiterated the Party's opposition to capital punishment. The 2024 platform is the first since the 2004 platform that does not mention the death penalty, and the first since 2016 not to call for abolition. However, on December 23, 2024, President Biden commuted the sentences of 37 out of 40 federal death row inmates to life in prison without parole.

==== Torture ====
Many Democrats are opposed to the use of torture against individuals apprehended and held prisoner by the United States military, and hold that categorizing such prisoners as unlawful combatants does not release the United States from its obligations under the Geneva Conventions. Democrats contend that torture is inhumane, damages the United States' moral standing in the world, and produces questionable results. Democrats are largely against waterboarding.

Torture became a divisive issue in the party after Barack Obama was elected president.

==== Privacy ====
The Democratic Party believes that individuals should have a right to privacy. For example, many Democrats have opposed the NSA warrantless surveillance of American citizens.

Some Democratic officeholders have championed consumer-protection laws that limit the sharing of consumer data among corporations. Democrats have opposed sodomy laws since the 1972 platform, which stated that "Americans should be free to make their own choice of life-styles and private habits without being subject to discrimination or prosecution", and believe that government should not regulate consensual noncommercial sexual conduct among adults as a matter of personal privacy.

=== Foreign policy issues ===
In foreign policy, the party supports liberal internationalism as well as tough stances against Russia.

The foreign policy of the voters of the two major parties has largely overlapped since the 1990s. A Gallup poll in early 2013 showed broad agreement on the top issues, albeit with some divergence regarding human rights and international cooperation through agencies such as the United Nations.

In June 2014, the Quinnipiac Poll asked Americans which foreign policy they preferred:

A) The United States is doing too much in other countries around the world, and it is time to do less around the world and focus more on our own problems here at home. B) The United States must continue to push forward to promote democracy and freedom in other countries worldwide because these efforts make our own country more secure.

Democrats chose A over B by 65% to 32%; Republicans chose A over B by 56% to 39%; and independents chose A over B by 67% to 29%.

==== China ====
According to a 2026 poll by the Chicago Council on Global Affairs, Democrats generally favor cooperation over conflict with China. 68% of Democrats think the US should "undertake friendly cooperation and engagement with China", while 29% believe the US should "actively work to limit the growth of China’s power". Additionally, only 35% and 26% of Democrats see China’s territorial ambitions and economic competition from China respectively as a critical threat. 37% of Democrats favor sending troops if China invaded Taiwan.

==== Iran ====
The Democratic Party has been critical of Iran's nuclear program and supported economic sanctions against the Iranian government. In 2013, the Democratic-led administration worked to reach a diplomatic agreement with the government of Iran to halt the Iranian nuclear program in exchange for international economic sanction relief. As of 2014, negotiations had been successful and the party called for more cooperation with Iran in the future. In 2015, the Obama administration agreed to the Joint Comprehensive Plan of Action, which provides sanction relief in exchange for international oversight of the Iranian nuclear program. In February 2019, the Democratic National Committee passed a resolution calling on the United States to re-enter the JCPOA, from which President Trump withdrew the United States in 2018.

==== Invasion of Afghanistan ====
Democrats in the House of Representatives and in the Senate near-unanimously voted for the Authorization for Use of Military Force Against Terrorists against "those responsible for the recent attacks launched against the United States" in Afghanistan in 2001, supporting the NATO coalition invasion of the nation. Most elected Democrats continued to support the Afghanistan conflict during George W. Bush's presidency. During the 2008 presidential election, then-candidate Barack Obama called for a "surge" of troops into Afghanistan. After winning the presidency, Obama followed through, sending additional troops to Afghanistan. Troop levels were 94,000 in December 2011 and kept falling, with a target of 68,000 by fall 2012.

Support for the war among the American people diminished over time. Many Democrats changed their opinion over the course of the war, coming to oppose the continuation of the conflict. In July 2008, Gallup found that 41% of Democrats called the invasion a "mistake" while a 55% majority disagreed. A CNN survey in August 2009 stated that a majority of Democrats opposed the war. CNN polling director Keating Holland said: "Nearly two thirds of Republicans support the war in Afghanistan. Three quarters of Democrats oppose the war".

During the 2020 presidential election, then-candidate Joe Biden promised to "end the forever wars in Afghanistan and the Middle East." Biden went on to win the election, and, in April 2021, he announced that he would withdraw all U.S. troops from Afghanistan by September 11 of that year. The last troops left in August, bringing America's 20-year-long military campaign in the country to a close. According to a 2023 AP-NORC poll, a majority of Democrats believed that the War in Afghanistan was not worth it.

==== Israel ====
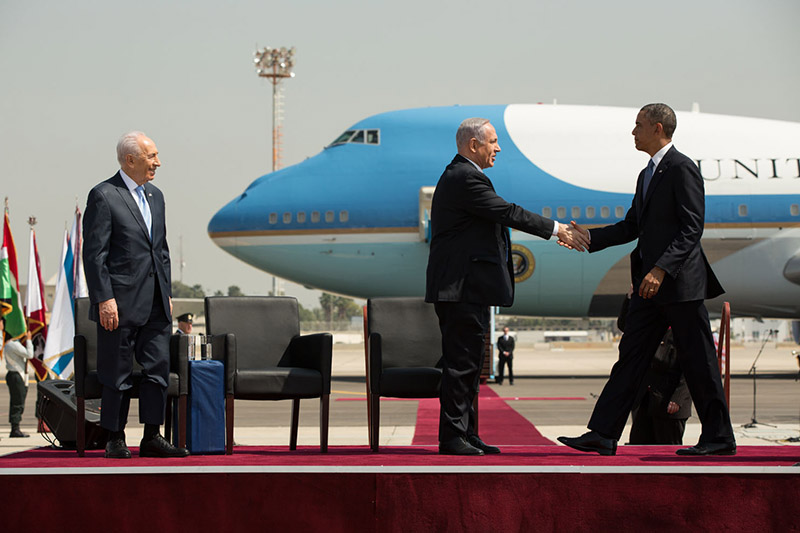
Israeli prime minister Benjamin Netanyahu meeting with President Obama in 2013.

Democrats have historically been stronger supporters of Israel than Republicans. During the 1940s, the party advocated for the cause of an independent Jewish state over the objections of many conservatives in the Old Right, who strongly opposed it. In 1948, Democratic President Harry Truman became the first world leader to recognize an independent state of Israel.

The 2020 Democratic Party platform acknowledges a "commitment to Israel's security, its qualitative military edge, its right to defend itself, and the 2016 Memorandum of Understanding is ironclad" and that "we oppose any effort to unfairly single out and delegitimize Israel, including at the United Nations or through the Boycott, Divestment, and Sanctions Movement". During the Gaza war, the party requested a large-scale military aid package to Israel. Biden also announced military support for Israel, condemned the actions of Hamas and other Palestinian militants as terrorism, and ordered the U.S. military to build a port to facilitate the arrival of humanitarian aid to Palestinian civilians in Gaza.

However, parts of the Democratic base also became more skeptical of the Israeli government. The number of Democrats (and Americans in general) who oppose sending arms to Israel has grown as Israel's war in Gaza has continued. Experts said support for Israel could have hurt Democrats in several key states, including Michigan and Pennsylvania, in the 2024 presidential election.

Late in 2024, twenty Democratic lawmakers requested support for U.S. legislation that would ban arms trade with countries that hinder humanitarian aid. According to a Pew Research Center poll conducted in March 2025, 69% of Democrats have an unfavorable view of Israel, compared to 53% in 2022, before the Gaza war. By July 2025, about half of the Democratic Senate delegation was opposed to sending arms to Israel. Within the context of sympathies in the Middle East situation, a Gallup poll conducted in February 2026 showed that 65% of Democrats expressed sympathy for Palestinians, compared to 17% for Israelis.

==== Europe, Russia, and Ukraine ====
The 2022 Russian invasion of Ukraine was politically and economically opposed by the Biden Administration, who promptly began an increased arming of Ukraine. In October 2023, the Biden administration requested an additional $61.4 billion in aid for Ukraine for the year ahead, but delays in the passage of further aid by the Republican-controlled House of Representatives inhibited progress, with the additional $61 billion in aid to Ukraine added in April 2024.

== Factions ==
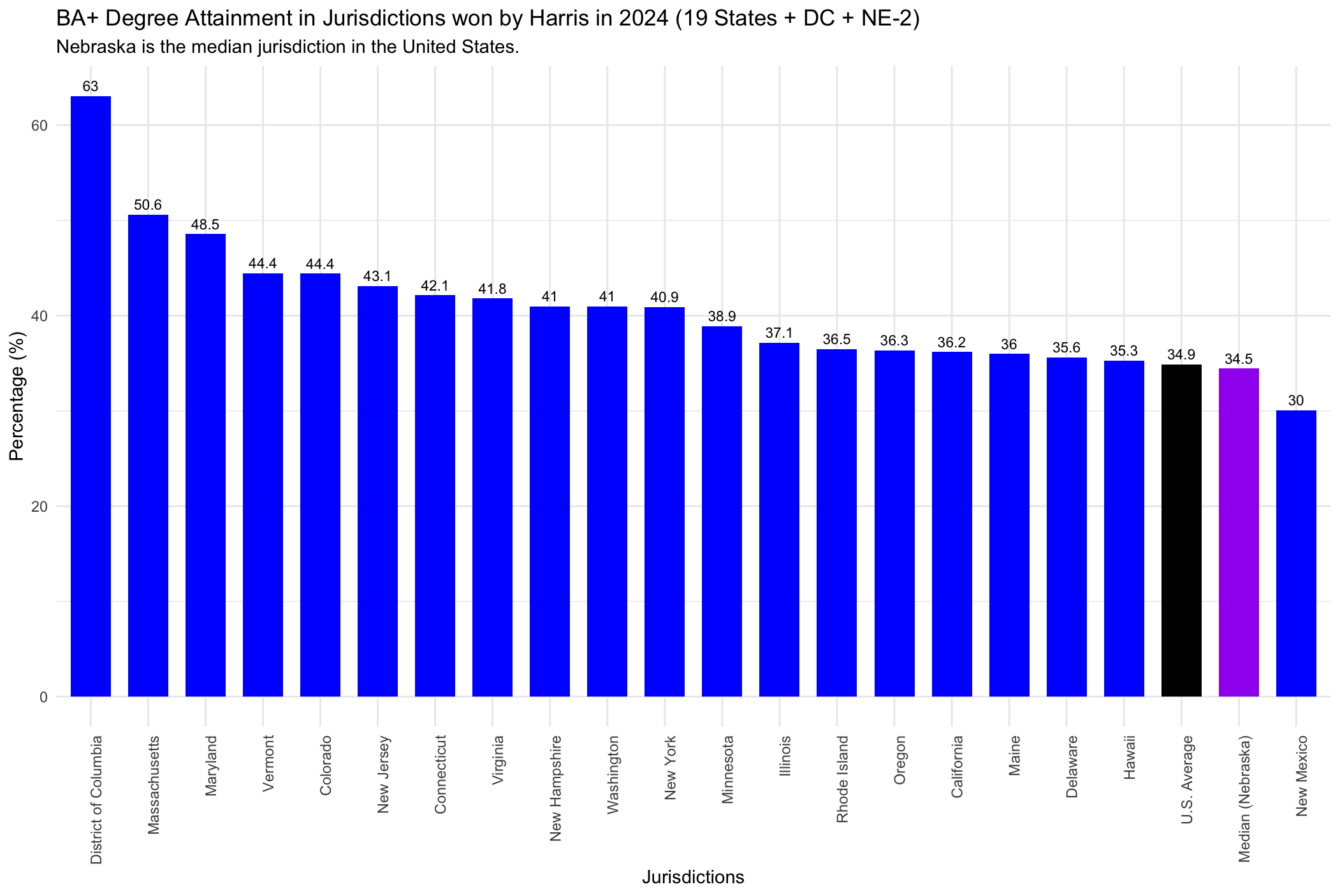
Bar plot of the percentage of the population with a BA or higher in the electoral jurisdictions won by Kamala Harris in the 2024 United States presidential election.

Upon foundation, the Democratic Party supported agrarianism and the Jacksonian democracy movement of President Andrew Jackson, representing farmers and rural interests and traditional Jeffersonian democrats. Since the 1890s, especially in Northern states, the party began to favor more liberal positions (the term "liberal" in this sense describes modern liberalism, rather than classical liberalism or economic liberalism). Historically, the party has represented farmers, laborers, and religious and ethnic minorities as it has opposed unregulated business and finance and favored progressive income taxes.

In the 1930s, the party began advocating social programs targeted at the poor. Before the New Deal, the party had a fiscally conservative, pro-business wing, typified by Grover Cleveland and Al Smith. The party was dominant in the Southern United States until President Lyndon B. Johnson signed the Civil Rights Act of 1964. In foreign policy, internationalism (including interventionism) was a dominant theme from 1913 to the mid-1960s. The major influences for liberalism were labor unions (which peaked in the 1936–1952 era) and African Americans. Environmentalism has been a major component since the 1970s.

Even after the New Deal, until the 2010s, the party still had a fiscally conservative faction, such as John Nance Garner and Howard W. Smith. The party's Southern conservative wing began shrinking after President Lyndon B. Johnson supported the Civil Rights Act of 1964, and largely died out in the 2010s, as the Republican Party built up its Southern base. The party still receives support from African Americans and urban areas in the Southern United States.

The 21st-century Democratic Party is predominantly a coalition of centrists, liberals, and progressives, with significant overlap between the three groups. In 2019, the Pew Research Center found that among Democratic and Democratic-leaning registered voters, 47% identify as liberal or very liberal, 38% identify as moderate, and 14% identify as conservative or very conservative. Political scientists characterize the Democratic Party as less ideologically cohesive than the Republican Party due to the broader diversity of coalitions that compose the Democratic Party.

The party has lost significant ground with voters without college degrees in the 21st century, in line with trends across the developed world. The realignment unfolded gradually, first with white voters in the South and Midwest, and later with voters as a whole without college degrees, except for African Americans.

Democrats have consistently won voters with graduate degrees since the 1990s, including a majority of white voters with graduate degrees. Since the 2010s, the party's main demographic gains have been among white voters with college degrees, which until 2016 had been a Republican-leaning group. The party still receives extremely strong support from African Americans, but has lost ground among other racial minorities, including Hispanics, Native Americans, and Asian Americans.

=== Liberals ===
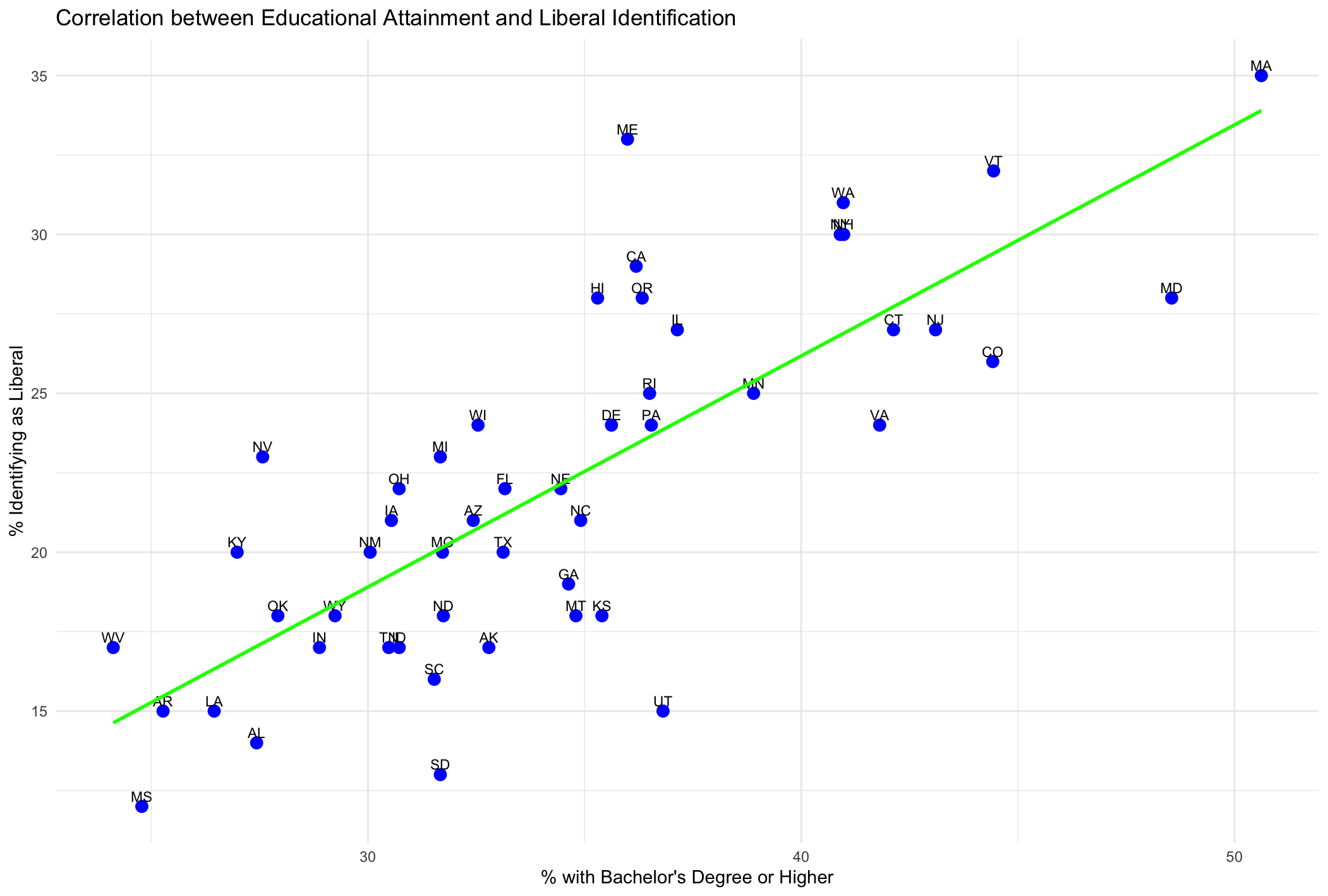
Top: Percent of self-identified liberals by state in 2018, according to a Gallup poll. Bottom: Linear regression of educational attainment vs. liberalism by state, based on the same Gallup data.

Modern liberals are a large portion of the Democratic base. According to 2018 exit polls, liberals constituted 27% of the electorate, and 91% of American liberals favored the candidate of the Democratic Party. White-collar college-educated professionals were mostly Republican until the 1950s, but they had become a vital component of the Democratic Party by the early 2000s.

According to a 2026 Gallup poll, 35% of American voters identify as "conservative" or "very conservative", 33% as "moderate", and 28% as "liberal" or "very liberal". For Democrats, 8% identified as conservative, 32% as moderate, and 59% as liberal.

A large majority of liberals favor moving toward universal health care. A majority also favor diplomacy over military action; stem cell research, same-sex marriage, stricter gun control, environmental protection laws, as well as the preservation of abortion rights. Immigration and cultural diversity are deemed positive as liberals favor cultural pluralism, a system in which immigrants retain their native culture in addition to adopting their new culture. Most liberals oppose increased military spending and the mixing of church and state. As of 2020, the three most significant labor groupings in the Democratic coalition were the AFL–CIO and Change to Win labor federations as well as the National Education Association, a large, unaffiliated teachers' union. Important issues for labor unions include supporting unionized manufacturing jobs, raising the minimum wage, and promoting broad social programs such as Social Security and Medicare.

This ideological group is strongly correlated with high educational attainment. According to the Pew Research Center, 49% were college graduates, the highest figure of any typographical group. It was also the fastest-growing typological group since the late 1990s to the present. Liberals include most of the academia and large portions of the professional class.

=== Moderates ===
Moderate Democrats, or New Democrats, are an ideologically centrist faction within the Democratic Party that emerged after the victory of Republican George H. W. Bush in the 1988 presidential election. Running as a New Democrat, Bill Clinton won the 1992 and 1996 presidential elections. They are an economically liberal and "Third Way" faction that dominated the party for around 20 years, until the beginning of Obama's presidency. They are represented by organizations such as the New Democrat Network and the New Democrat Coalition.

The Blue Dog Coalition, the most right-leaning part of the party, was formed during the 104th Congress to give members from the Democratic Party representing conservative-leaning districts a unified voice after the Democrats' loss of Congress in the 1994 Republican Revolution. However, in the late 2010s and early 2020s, the coalition's focus shifted towards ideological centrism. One of the most influential centrist groups was the Democratic Leadership Council (DLC), a nonprofit organization that advocated centrist positions for the party. The DLC disbanded in 2011.

Some Democratic elected officials have self-declared as being centrists, including former president Bill Clinton, former vice president Al Gore, Senator Mark Warner, Kansas governor Laura Kelly, former senator Jim Webb, and President Joe Biden. The New Democrat Network supports socially liberal and fiscally moderate Democratic politicians and is associated with the congressional New Democrat Coalition in the House. Annie Kuster is the chair of the coalition, and former senator and president Barack Obama was self-described as a New Democrat. In the 21st century, some former Republican moderates have switched to the Democratic Party. Several anti-Trump conservatives likewise ended up becoming Democrats.

=== Progressives ===
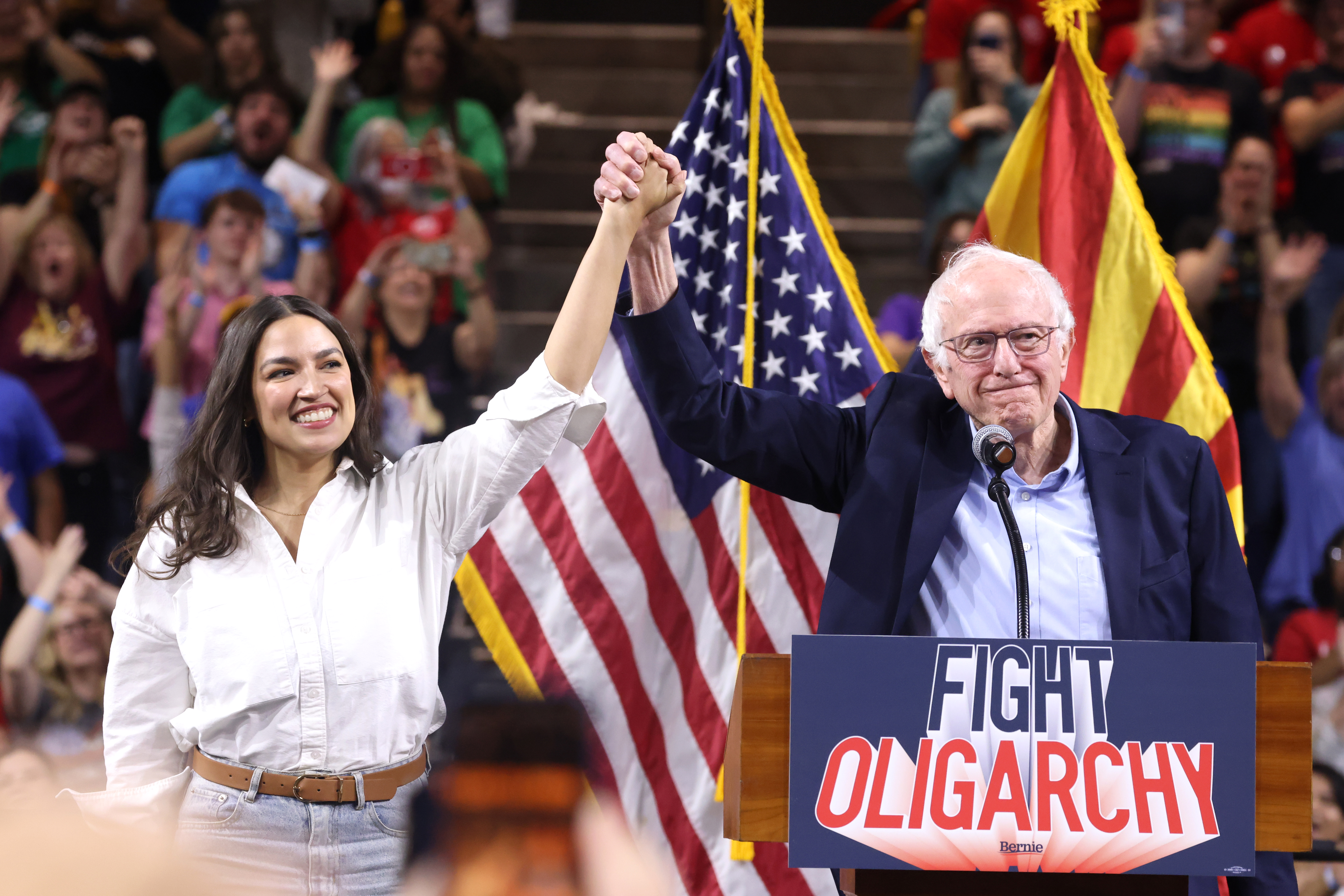
Bernie Sanders and Alexandria Ocasio-Cortez during the Fighting Oligarchy tour.

Progressives are the most left-leaning faction in the party and support strong business regulations, social programs, and workers' rights. In 2014, progressive Senator Elizabeth Warren set out "Eleven Commandments of Progressivism": tougher regulation on corporations; affordable education; scientific investment and environmentalism; net neutrality; increased wages; equal pay for women; collective bargaining rights; defending social programs; same-sex marriage; immigration reform; and unabridged access to reproductive healthcare. The Congressional Progressive Caucus (CPC) is a caucus of progressive Democrats chaired by Greg Casar of Texas. Its members have included representatives Dennis Kucinich of Ohio, John Conyers of Michigan, Jim McDermott of Washington, Barbara Lee of California, and Senator Paul Wellstone of Minnesota. Senators Tammy Baldwin of Wisconsin, Mazie Hirono of Hawaii, and Ed Markey of Massachusetts were members of the caucus when in the House of Representatives. As of 2024, the CPC is the second-largest ideological caucus in the House Democratic Caucus by voting members, behind the New Democrat Coalition. Senator Bernie Sanders has often been viewed as a leader of the progressive movement; he ran presidential campaigns in 2016 and 2020. Other members of the progressive faction include the Squad, a left-wing group. A small number of progressives self-identify as democratic socialists, although supporters and some academic experts describe their beliefs as being closer to European social democracy.

== Democratic presidents ==
As of 2025, there have been a total of 16 Democratic presidents and 17 Democratic presidencies.

| # | Name (lifespan) | Portrait | State | Presidency start date | Presidency end date | Time in office |
|---|---|---|---|---|---|---|
| 7 | Andrew Jackson (1767–1845) | | Tennessee | March 4, 1829 | March 4, 1837 | 8 years, 0 days |
| 8 | Martin Van Buren (1782–1862) | | New York | March 4, 1837 | March 4, 1841 | 4 years, 0 days |
| 11 | James K. Polk (1795–1849) | | Tennessee | March 4, 1845 | March 4, 1849 | 4 years, 0 days |
| 14 | Franklin Pierce (1804–1869) | | New Hampshire | March 4, 1853 | March 4, 1857 | 4 years, 0 days |
| 15 | James Buchanan (1791–1868) | | Pennsylvania | March 4, 1857 | March 4, 1861 | 4 years, 0 days |
| 17 | Andrew Johnson (1808–1875) | | Tennessee | April 15, 1865 (Note: Elected as Vice President with the National Union Party ticket in the 1864 presidential election. Ascended to the presidency after the assassination of President Abraham Lincoln in 1865. Rejoined the Democratic Party in 1868.) | March 4, 1869 | 3 years, 323 days |
| 22 | Grover Cleveland (1837–1908) | | New York | March 4, 1885 | March 4, 1889 | 8 years, 0 days |
| 24 | Grover Cleveland (1837–1908) | | New York | March 4, 1893 | March 4, 1897 | 8 years, 0 days |
| 28 | Woodrow Wilson (1856–1924) | | New Jersey | March 4, 1913 | March 4, 1921 | 8 years, 0 days |
| 32 | Franklin D. Roosevelt (1882–1945) | | New York | March 4, 1933 | April 12, 1945 (Note: Died in office) | 12 years, 39 days |
| 33 | Harry S. Truman (1884–1972) | | Missouri | April 12, 1945 | January 20, 1953 | 7 years, 283 days |
| 35 | John F. Kennedy (1917–1963) | | Massachusetts | January 20, 1961 | November 22, 1963 | 2 years, 306 days |
| 36 | Lyndon B. Johnson (1908–1973) | | Texas | November 22, 1963 | January 20, 1969 | 5 years, 59 days |
| 39 | Jimmy Carter (1924–2024) | | Georgia | January 20, 1977 | January 20, 1981 | 4 years, 0 days |
| 42 | Bill Clinton (born 1946) | | Arkansas | January 20, 1993 | January 20, 2001 | 8 years, 0 days |
| 44 | Barack Obama (born 1961) | | Illinois | January 20, 2009 | January 20, 2017 | 8 years, 0 days |
| 46 | Joe Biden (born 1942) | | Delaware | January 20, 2021 | January 20, 2025 | 4 years, 0 days |

== Election results ==
=== In congressional elections: 1828–present ===
United States congressional elections
| House election year | No. of overall House seats won | +/– | Presidency | No. of overall Senate seats won | +/– (Note: Comparing seats held immediately preceding and following the general election) | Senate election year |
|---|---|---|---|---|---|---|
| 1828 | 136 / 213 | ▲136 | Andrew Jackson | 26 / 48 | ▲26 | 1828 |
| 1830 | 126 / 213 | ▼10 | Andrew Jackson | 26 / 48 | 0 | 1830 |
| 1832 | 143 / 240 | ▲17 | Andrew Jackson | 21 / 48 | ▼5 | 1832 |
| 1834 | 143 / 242 | 0 | Andrew Jackson | 22 / 48 | ▲1 | 1834 |
| 1836 | 128 / 242 | ▼15 | Martin Van Buren | 34 / 52 | ▲12 | 1836 |
| 1838 | 126 / 242 | ▼2 | Martin Van Buren | 28 / 52 | ▼6 | 1838 |
| 1840 | 98 / 242 | ▼28 | William Henry Harrison | 22 / 52 | ▼6 | 1840 |
| 1842 | 147 / 223 | ▲49 | John Tyler (Note: Tyler was ejected from the Whig Party, in September 1841.) | 23 / 52 | ▲1 | 1842 |
| 1844 | 142 / 228 | ▼5 | James K. Polk | 27 / 54 | ▲4 | 1844 |
| 1846 | 108 / 228 | ▼34 | James K. Polk | 35 / 58 | ▲8 | 1846 |
| 1848 | 113 / 233 | ▲5 | Zachary Taylor | 33 / 60 | ▼2 | 1848 |
| 1850 | 127 / 233 | ▲14 | Millard Fillmore | 33 / 62 | 0 | 1850 |
| 1852 | 157 / 234 | ▲30 | Franklin Pierce | 35 / 62 | ▲2 | 1852 |
| 1854 | 82 / 234 | ▼75 | Franklin Pierce | 33 / 62 | ▼2 | 1854 |
| 1856 | 132 / 237 | ▲50 | James Buchanan | 34 / 62 | ▲1 | 1856 |
| 1858 | 83 / 238 | ▼49 | James Buchanan | 38 / 66 | ▲4 | 1858 |
| 1860 | 43 / 180 | ▼40 | Abraham Lincoln | 31 / 68 | ▼7 | 1860 |
| 1862 | 73 / 183 | ▲30 | Abraham Lincoln | 10 / 70 | ▼21 | 1862 |
| 1864 | 35 / 192 | ▼38 | Abraham Lincoln | 9 / 72 | ▼1 | 1864 |
| 1866 | 45 / 193 | ▲10 | Andrew Johnson | 10 / 72 | ▲1 | 1866 |
| 1868 | 67 / 243 | ▲22 | Ulysses S. Grant | 9 / 74 | ▼1 | 1868 |
| 1870 | 94 / 243 | ▲27 | Ulysses S. Grant | 14 / 74 | ▲5 | 1870 |
| 1872 | 84 / 292 | ▼10 | Ulysses S. Grant | 19 / 74 | ▲5 | 1872 |
| 1874 | 180 / 292 | ▲96 | Ulysses S. Grant | 28 / 74 | ▲9 | 1874 |
| 1876 | 155 / 293 | ▼25 | Rutherford B. Hayes | 35 / 76 | ▲7 | 1876 |
| 1878 | 141 / 293 | ▼14 | Rutherford B. Hayes | 42 / 76 | ▲7 | 1878 |
| 1880 | 128 / 293 | ▼13 | James A. Garfield | 37 / 76 | ▼5 | 1880 |
| 1882 | 196 / 325 | ▲68 | Chester A. Arthur | 36 / 76 | ▼1 | 1882 |
| 1884 | 182 / 325 | ▼14 | Grover Cleveland | 34 / 76 | ▼2 | 1884 |
| 1886 | 167 / 325 | ▼15 | Grover Cleveland | 36 / 76 | ▲2 | 1886 |
| 1888 | 152 / 332 | ▼15 | Benjamin Harrison | 37 / 76 | ▲1 | 1888 |
| 1890 | 238 / 332 | ▲86 | Benjamin Harrison | 39 / 88 | ▲2 | 1890 |
| 1892 | 218 / 356 | ▼20 | Grover Cleveland | 43 / 88 | ▲4 | 1892 |
| 1894 | 93 / 356 | ▼125 | Grover Cleveland | 40 / 88 | ▼3 | 1894 |
| 1896 | 124 / 357 | ▲31 | William McKinley | 32 / 90 | ▼8 | 1896 |
| 1898 | 161 / 357 | ▲37 | William McKinley | 27 / 90 | ▼5 | 1898 |
| 1900 | 151 / 357 | ▼10 | William McKinley | 29 / 90 | ▲2 | 1902 |
| 1902 | 176 / 386 | ▲25 | Theodore Roosevelt | 33 / 90 | ▲4 | 1902 |
| 1904 | 135 / 386 | ▼41 | Theodore Roosevelt | 32 / 90 | ▼1 | 1904 |
| 1906 | 167 / 391 | ▲32 | Theodore Roosevelt | 29 / 90 | ▼3 | 1906 |
| 1908 | 172 / 391 | ▲5 | William Howard Taft | 32 / 92 | ▲3 | 1908 |
| 1910 | 227 / 391 | ▲55 | William Howard Taft | 42 / 92 | ▲10 | 1910 |
| 1912 | 291 / 435 | ▲64 | Woodrow Wilson | 47 / 96 | ▲5 | 1912 |
| 1914 | 230 / 435 | ▼61 | Woodrow Wilson | 56 / 96 | ▲9 | 1914 |
| 1916 | 214 / 435 | ▼16 | Woodrow Wilson | 54 / 96 | ▼2 | 1916 |
| 1918 | 192 / 435 | ▼22 | Woodrow Wilson | 47 / 96 | ▼7 | 1918 |
| 1920 | 131 / 435 | ▼61 | Warren G. Harding | 37 / 96 | ▼10 | 1920 |
| 1922 | 207 / 435 | ▲76 | Warren G. Harding | 42 / 96 | ▲5 | 1922 |
| 1924 | 183 / 435 | ▼24 | Calvin Coolidge | 40 / 96 | ▼2 | 1924 |
| 1926 | 194 / 435 | ▲11 | Calvin Coolidge | 46 / 96 | ▲6 | 1926 |
| 1928 | 164 / 435 | ▼30 | Herbert Hoover | 39 / 96 | ▼7 | 1928 |
| 1930 | 216 / 435 | ▲52 | Herbert Hoover | 47 / 96 | ▲8 | 1930 |
| 1932 | 313 / 435 | ▲97 | Franklin D. Roosevelt | 59 / 96 | ▲12 | 1932 |
| 1934 | 322 / 435 | ▲9 | Franklin D. Roosevelt | 69 / 96 | ▲10 | 1934 |
| 1936 | 334 / 435 | ▲12 | Franklin D. Roosevelt | 75 / 96 | ▲6 | 1936 |
| 1938 | 262 / 435 | ▼72 | Franklin D. Roosevelt | 69 / 96 | ▼6 | 1938 |
| 1940 | 267 / 435 | ▲5 | Franklin D. Roosevelt | 66 / 96 | ▼3 | 1940 |
| 1942 | 222 / 435 | ▼45 | Franklin D. Roosevelt | 57 / 96 | ▼9 | 1942 |
| 1944 | 244 / 435 | ▲22 | Franklin D. Roosevelt | 57 / 96 | 0 | 1944 |
| 1946 | 188 / 435 | ▼56 | Harry S. Truman | 45 / 96 | ▼12 | 1946 |
| 1948 | 263 / 435 | ▲75 | Harry S. Truman | 54 / 96 | ▲9 | 1948 |
| 1950 | 235 / 435 | ▼28 | Harry S. Truman | 49 / 96 | ▼5 | 1950 |
| 1952 | 213 / 435 | ▼22 | Dwight D. Eisenhower | 47 / 96 | ▼2 | 1952 |
| 1954 | 232 / 435 | ▲19 | Dwight D. Eisenhower | 48 / 96 | ▲1 | 1954 |
| 1956 | 234 / 435 | ▲2 | Dwight D. Eisenhower | 49 / 96 | ▲1 | 1956 |
| 1958 | 283 / 436 | ▲49 | Dwight D. Eisenhower | 64 / 98 | ▲15 | 1958 |
| 1960 | 262 / 437 | ▼21 | John F. Kennedy | 64 / 100 | 0 | 1960 |
| 1962 | 259 / 435 | ▼3 | John F. Kennedy | 68 / 100 | ▲4 | 1962 |
| 1964 | 295 / 435 | ▲36 | Lyndon B. Johnson | 68 / 100 | 0 | 1964 |
| 1966 | 248 / 435 | ▼47 | Lyndon B. Johnson | 64 / 100 | ▼4 | 1966 |
| 1968 | 243 / 435 | ▼5 | Richard Nixon | 58 / 100 | ▼6 | 1968 |
| 1970 | 255 / 435 | ▲12 | Richard Nixon | 54 / 100 | ▼4 | 1970 |
| 1972 | 242 / 435 | ▼13 | Richard Nixon | 56 / 100 | ▲2 | 1972 |
| 1974 | 291 / 435 | ▲49 | Gerald Ford | 61 / 100 | ▲5 | 1974 |
| 1976 | 292 / 435 | ▲1 | Jimmy Carter | 61 / 100 | 0 | 1976 |
| 1978 | 277 / 435 | ▼15 | Jimmy Carter | 58 / 100 | ▼3 | 1978 |
| 1980 | 242 / 435 | ▼35 | Ronald Reagan | 46 / 100 | ▼12 | 1980 |
| 1982 | 269 / 435 | ▲27 | Ronald Reagan | 46 / 100 | 0 | 1982 |
| 1984 | 253 / 435 | ▼16 | Ronald Reagan | 47 / 100 | ▲1 | 1984 |
| 1986 | 258 / 435 | ▲5 | Ronald Reagan | 55 / 100 | ▲8 | 1986 |
| 1988 | 260 / 435 | ▲2 | George H. W. Bush | 55 / 100 | 0 | 1988 |
| 1990 | 267 / 435 | ▲7 | George H. W. Bush | 56 / 100 | ▲1 | 1990 |
| 1992 | 258 / 435 | ▼9 | Bill Clinton | 57 / 100 | ▲1 | 1992 |
| 1994 | 204 / 435 | ▼54 | Bill Clinton | 48 / 100 | ▼9 | 1994 |
| 1996 | 207 / 435 | ▲3 | Bill Clinton | 45 / 100 | ▼3 | 1996 |
| 1998 | 211 / 435 | ▲4 | Bill Clinton | 45 / 100 | 0 | 1998 |
| 2000 | 212 / 435 | ▲1 | George W. Bush | 50 / 100 | ▲5 (Note: Republican Vice President Dick Cheney provided a tie-breaking vote, giving Republicans a majority until June 6, 2001, when Jim Jeffords left Republicans to join the Democratic Caucus.) | 2000 |
| 2002 | 205 / 435 | ▼7 | George W. Bush | 48 / 100 | ▼2 | 2002 |
| 2004 | 202 / 435 | ▼3 | George W. Bush | 44 / 100 | ▼4 | 2004 |
| 2006 | 233 / 435 | ▲31 | George W. Bush | 49 / 100 | ▲5 | 2006 |
| 2008 | 257 / 435 | ▲24 | Barack Obama | 57 / 100 | ▲8 | 2008 |
| 2010 | 193 / 435 | ▼64 | Barack Obama | 51 / 100 | ▼6 | 2010 |
| 2012 | 201 / 435 | ▲8 | Barack Obama | 53 / 100 | ▲2 | 2012 |
| 2014 | 188 / 435 | ▼13 | Barack Obama | 44 / 100 | ▼9 | 2014 |
| 2016 | 194 / 435 | ▲6 | Donald Trump | 46 / 100 | ▲2 | 2016 |
| 2018 | 235 / 435 | ▲41 | Donald Trump | 45 / 100 | ▼1 | 2018 |
| 2020 | 222 / 435 | ▼13 | Joe Biden | 48 / 100 | ▲3 | 2020 |
| 2022 | 213 / 435 | ▼9 | Joe Biden | 49 / 100 | ▲1 | 2022 |
| 2024 | 215 / 435 | ▲2 | Donald Trump | 45 / 100 | ▼4 | 2024 |

=== In presidential elections: 1828–present ===
| Election year | Presidential ticket | | Votes | Vote % | Electoral votes | +/– | Result |
| Election year | Presidential nominee | Running mate | Votes | Vote % | Electoral votes | +/– | Result |
|---|---|---|---|---|---|---|---|
| 1828 | Andrew Jackson | John C. Calhoun | 642,553 | 56.0 | 178 / 261 | ▲178 | Won |
| 1832 | Andrew Jackson | Martin Van Buren | 701,780 | 54.2 | 219 / 286 | ▲41 | Won |
| 1836 | Martin Van Buren | Richard Mentor Johnson | 764,176 | 50.8 | 170 / 294 | ▼49 | Won |
| 1840 | Martin Van Buren | None (Note: While there was no official Democratic nominee, the majority of the Democratic electors still cast their electoral votes for incumbent Vice President Richard Mentor Johnson.) | 1,128,854 | 46.8 | 60 / 294 | ▼110 | Lost |
| 1844 | James K. Polk | George M. Dallas | 1,339,494 | 49.5 | 170 / 275 | ▲110 | Won |
| 1848 | Lewis Cass | William O. Butler | 1,223,460 | 42.5 | 127 / 290 | ▼43 | Lost |
| 1852 | Franklin Pierce | William R. King | 1,607,510 | 50.8 | 254 / 296 | ▲127 | Won |
| 1856 | James Buchanan | John C. Breckinridge | 1,836,072 | 45.3 | 174 / 296 | ▼80 | Won |
| 1860 | Stephen A. Douglas | Herschel V. Johnson | 1,380,202 | 29.5 | 12 / 303 | ▼162 | Lost |
| 1864 | George B. McClellan | George H. Pendleton | 1,812,807 | 45.0 | 21 / 233 | ▲9 | Lost |
| 1868 | Horatio Seymour | Francis Preston Blair Jr. | 2,706,829 | 47.3 | 80 / 294 | ▲59 | Lost |
| 1872 | Horace Greeley (Note: Greeley and Brown were cross-endorsed by the Liberal Republican Party.) | Benjamin G. Brown | 2,834,761 | 43.8 | 69 / 352 | ▼11 | Lost |
| 1876 | Samuel J. Tilden | Thomas A. Hendricks | 4,288,546 | 50.9 | 184 / 369 | ▲115 | Lost (Note: Although Tilden won a majority of the popular vote, Republican Rutherford B. Hayes won a majority of votes in the Electoral College.) |
| 1880 | Winfield Scott Hancock | William H. English | 4,444,260 | 48.2 | 155 / 369 | ▼29 | Lost |
| 1884 | Grover Cleveland | Thomas A. Hendricks | 4,914,482 | 48.9 | 219 / 401 | ▲64 | Won |
| 1888 | Grover Cleveland | Allen G. Thurman | 5,534,488 | 48.6 | 168 / 401 | ▼51 | Lost (Note: Although Cleveland won a plurality of the popular vote, Republican Benjamin Harrison won a majority of votes in the Electoral College.) |
| 1892 | Grover Cleveland | Adlai Stevenson I | 5,556,918 | 46.0 | 277 / 444 | ▲109 | Won |
| 1896 | William Jennings Bryan | Arthur Sewall | 6,509,052 | 46.7 | 176 / 447 | ▼101 | Lost |
| 1900 | William Jennings Bryan | Adlai Stevenson I | 6,370,932 | 45.5 | 155 / 447 | ▼21 | Lost |
| 1904 | Alton B. Parker | Henry G. Davis | 5,083,880 | 37.6 | 140 / 476 | ▼15 | Lost |
| 1908 | William Jennings Bryan | John W. Kern | 6,408,984 | 43.0 | 162 / 483 | ▲22 | Lost |
| 1912 | Woodrow Wilson | Thomas R. Marshall | 6,296,284 | 41.8 | 435 / 531 | ▲273 | Won |
| 1916 | Woodrow Wilson | Thomas R. Marshall | 9,126,868 | 49.2 | 277 / 531 | ▼158 | Won |
| 1920 | James M. Cox | Franklin D. Roosevelt | 9,139,661 | 34.2 | 127 / 531 | ▼150 | Lost |
| 1924 | John W. Davis | Charles W. Bryan | 8,386,242 | 28.8 | 136 / 531 | ▲9 | Lost |
| 1928 | Al Smith | Joseph T. Robinson | 15,015,464 | 40.8 | 87 / 531 | ▼49 | Lost |
| 1932 | Franklin D. Roosevelt | John Nance Garner | 22,821,277 | 57.4 | 472 / 531 | ▲385 | Won |
| 1936 | Franklin D. Roosevelt | John Nance Garner | 27,747,636 | 60.8 | 523 / 531 | ▲51 | Won |
| 1940 | Franklin D. Roosevelt | Henry A. Wallace | 27,313,945 | 54.7 | 449 / 531 | ▼74 | Won |
| 1944 | Franklin D. Roosevelt | Harry S. Truman | 25,612,916 | 53.4 | 432 / 531 | ▼17 | Won |
| 1948 | Harry S. Truman | Alben W. Barkley | 24,179,347 | 49.6 | 303 / 531 | ▼129 | Won |
| 1952 | Adlai Stevenson II | John Sparkman | 27,375,090 | 44.3 | 89 / 531 | ▼214 | Lost |
| 1956 | Adlai Stevenson II | Estes Kefauver | 26,028,028 | 42.0 | 73 / 531 | ▼16 | Lost |
| 1960 | John F. Kennedy | Lyndon B. Johnson | 34,220,984 | 49.7 | 303 / 537 | ▲230 | Won |
| 1964 | Lyndon B. Johnson | Hubert Humphrey | 43,127,041 | 61.1 | 486 / 538 | ▲183 | Won |
| 1968 | Hubert Humphrey | Edmund Muskie | 31,271,839 | 42.7 | 191 / 538 | ▼295 | Lost |
| 1972 | George McGovern | Sargent Shriver | 29,173,222 | 37.5 | 17 / 538 | ▼174 | Lost |
| 1976 | Jimmy Carter | Walter Mondale | 40,831,881 | 50.1 | 297 / 538 | ▲280 | Won |
| 1980 | Jimmy Carter | Walter Mondale | 35,480,115 | 41.0 | 49 / 538 | ▼248 | Lost |
| 1984 | Walter Mondale | Geraldine Ferraro | 37,577,352 | 40.6 | 13 / 538 | ▼36 | Lost |
| 1988 | Michael Dukakis | Lloyd Bentsen | 41,809,074 | 45.6 | 111 / 538 | ▲98 | Lost |
| 1992 | Bill Clinton | Al Gore | 44,909,806 | 43.0 | 370 / 538 | ▲259 | Won |
| 1996 | Bill Clinton | Al Gore | 47,401,185 | 49.2 | 379 / 538 | ▲9 | Won |
| 2000 | Al Gore | Joe Lieberman | 50,999,897 | 48.4 | 266 / 538 | ▼113 | Lost (Note: Although Gore won a plurality of the popular vote, Republican George W. Bush won a majority of votes in the Electoral College.) |
| 2004 | John Kerry | John Edwards | 59,028,444 | 48.3 | 251 / 538 | ▼15 | Lost |
| 2008 | Barack Obama | Joe Biden | 69,498,516 | 52.9 | 365 / 538 | ▲114 | Won |
| 2012 | Barack Obama | Joe Biden | 65,915,795 | 51.1 | 332 / 538 | ▼33 | Won |
| 2016 | Hillary Clinton | Tim Kaine | 65,853,514 | 48.2 | 227 / 538 | ▼105 | Lost (Note: Although Clinton won a plurality of the popular vote, Republican Donald Trump won a majority of votes in the Electoral College.) |
| 2020 | Joe Biden | Kamala Harris | 81,283,501 | 51.3 | 306 / 538 | ▲79 | Won |
| 2024 | Kamala Harris | Tim Walz | 75,017,613 | 48.3 | 226 / 538 | ▼80 | Lost |

== See also ==
- Democratic Party (United States) organizations
- List of major liberal parties considered left
- List of state parties of the Democratic Party (United States)
- List of United States Democratic Party presidential candidates
- List of United States Democratic Party presidential tickets
- List of Latino Democrats
- Political parties in the United States
- Political party strength in U.S. states
- Working Families Party
