= Ancestral background of presidents of the United States =

The ancestral background of presidents of the United States has been relatively consistent throughout American history. The most common ancestry of U.S. presidents is English, due to the country's origins as a group of former English colonies. With the exception of Martin Van Buren and possibly Dwight D. Eisenhower, every president has ancestors from the British Isles; Van Buren was of Dutch (New Netherlander) lineage and Eisenhower was of German (Pennsylvania Dutch) and Swiss heritage. John F. Kennedy, Woodrow Wilson, Ronald W. Reagan, and Donald Trump are the only known presidents who did not have ancestors who arrived during the colonial period. Barack Obama, the country's first and so far only African American president, is the only president to have ancestry from outside of Europe; his paternal family is descended from the Luo people of Kenya. He is also believed to be a direct descendant of John Punch, a colonial-era slave born in modern-day Cameroon. There is no evidence that any president has had Indigenous American ancestry.

The most common ethnic groups in the Thirteen Colonies were those from either Great Britain (England, Scotland, and Wales) or Ulster (north Ireland). Those of Irish, Dutch, German, or French backgrounds would see attempts to assimilate them into the dominant English and predominately Protestant culture. A majority of presidents trace their ancestries to the American colonists, in which they are known as Old Stock Americans.

Some nativist political groups within the United States were adamantly opposed to identifying with a foreign nation and would coin those who did as hyphenated Americans. Presidents Theodore Roosevelt and Woodrow Wilson were outspoken opponents of hyphenated Americans, with Wilson once remarking, "Any man who carries a hyphen about with him, carries a dagger that he is ready to plunge into the vitals of this Republic when he gets ready."

== Ancestry table of American Presidents ==
Summary:

- (British) English – 38
- (British) Scottish – 23
- (British) Ulster Scots – 23
- (British) Welsh – 17
- French – 13
- German – 11
- Irish – 8
- Dutch – 6
- Swiss – 3
- Swedish – 2
- (British) Guernsey – 1
- Kenyan (Luo) – 1
- Polish – 1

No.	President and parents	Dutch	English	French	German	Guernsey	Irish	Luo	Polish	Scottish	Swedish	Swiss	Ulster Scots	Welsh	Patrilineal emigrant ancestor	Citations
1	George Washington (1732–1799) Augustine Washington Mary Ball		Yes	Yes											John Washington (great-grandfather); Sulgrave, England → Colony of Virginia (1656)	
2	John Adams (1735–1826) John Adams Sr. Susanna Boylston		Yes											Yes	Henry Adams (2nd great-grandfather); Braintree, England → Braintree, Massachusetts Bay Colony (c. 1633)	
3	Thomas Jefferson (1743–1826) Peter Jefferson Jane Randolph		Yes							Yes				Yes	Samuel Jefferson (2nd great-grandfather) Pettistree, England → Saint Kitts/Antigua (1624)	
4	James Madison (1751–1836) James Madison Sr. Eleanor Rose Conway		Yes											Yes	Isaac Madison (3rd great-grandfather); London, England → Jamestown, Colony of Virginia (1608)	
5	James Monroe (1758–1831) Spence Monroe Elizabeth Jones		Yes	Yes						Yes				Yes	Patrick Andrew Monroe (2nd great-grandfather); Scotland → Colony of Virginia (c. 1650)	
6	John Quincy Adams (1767–1848) John Adams Abigail Smith		Yes											Yes	Henry Adams (3rd great-grandfather); Braintree, England → Braintree, Massachusetts Bay Colony (c. 1633)	
7	Andrew Jackson (1767–1845) Andrew Jackson Sr. Elizabeth Hutchinson		Yes							Yes			Yes		Andrew Jackson Sr. (father); Boneybefore, Ireland → Waxhaws, Carolinas (1765)	
8	Martin Van Buren (1782–1862) Abraham Van Buren Maria Hoes	Yes													Cornelis Maessen van Buren (3rd great-grandfather); Buurmalsen, Netherlands → New Netherland (1631)	
9	William Henry Harrison (1773–1841) Benjamin Harrison V Elizabeth Bassett		Yes										Yes	Yes	Benjamin Harrison (3rd great-grandfather); England → Colony of Virginia (c. 1630)	
10	John Tyler (1790–1862) John Tyler Sr. Mary Marot Armisted		Yes	Yes											Henry Tyler (3rd great-grandfather); Shropshire, England → Colony of Virginia (c. 1652)	
11	James K. Polk (1795–1849) Samuel Polk Jane Knox									Yes			Yes		Robert Bruce Polk (great-grandfather); Lifford, Ireland → Province of Maryland (c. 1680)	
12	Zachary Taylor (1784–1850) Richard Taylor Sarah Dabney Strother		Yes												James Taylor (2nd great-grandfather); England → Colony of Virginia	
13	Millard Fillmore (1800–1874) Nathaniel Fillmore Phoebe Millard		Yes												John Fillmore Sr. (2nd great-grandfather); England →Ipswich, Massachusetts Bay Colony	
14	Franklin Pierce (1804–1869) Benjamin Pierce Anna Kendrick		Yes											Yes	Thomas Pierce (3rd great-grandfather); Norwich, England → Massachusetts Bay Colony (c. 1634)	
15	James Buchanan (1791–1868) James Buchanan Sr. Elizabeth Speer									Yes			Yes		James Buchanan Sr. (father); Ramelton, Ireland → Pennsylvania (1783)	
16	Abraham Lincoln (1809–1865) Thomas Lincoln Nancy Hanks		Yes										Yes	Yes	Samuel Lincoln (4th great-grandfather); Hingham, England → Hingham, Massachusetts Bay Colony (1638)	
17	Andrew Johnson (1808–1875) Jacob Johnson Mary McDonough		Yes							Yes			Yes		Edward Johnston (2nd great-grandfather); Aberdeen, Scotland → New Kent, Colony of Virginia (1664)	
18	Ulysses S. Grant (1822–1885) Jesse Root Grant Hannah Simpson		Yes	Yes						Yes			Yes		Matthew Grant (5th great-grandfather); Exeter, England → Massachusetts Bay Colony (1630)	
19	Rutherford B. Hayes (1822–1893) Rutherford Hayes Jr. Sophia Birchard		Yes							Yes			Yes		George Hayes (3rd great-grandfather); Scotland → Windsor, Connecticut Colony (c. 1680)	
20	James A. Garfield (1831–1881) Abram Garfield Eliza Ballou		Yes	Yes										Yes	Edward Garfield (5th great-grandfather); Hillmorton, England → Massachusetts Bay Colony (1630)	
21	Chester A. Arthur (1829–1886) William Arthur Malvina Stone		Yes							Yes			Yes	Yes	William Arthur (father); Cullybackey, Ireland → Lower Canada (c. 1820) → Vermont (c. 1822)	
22/24	Grover Cleveland (1837–1908) Richard Falley Cleveland Ann Neal		Yes		Yes	Yes	Yes						Yes		Moses Cleveland (5th great-grandfather); Ipswich, England → Massachusetts Bay Colony (1635)	
23	Benjamin Harrison (1833–1901) John Scott Harrison Elizabeth Ramsey Irwin		Yes							Yes			Yes	Yes	Benjamin Harrison (5th great-grandfather); England → Colony of Virginia (c. 1630)	
25	William McKinley (1843–1901) William McKinley Sr. Nancy Campbell Allison		Yes							Yes			Yes		John McKinley (2nd great-grandfather); Dervock, Ireland → Province of Pennsylvania (1742)	
26	Theodore Roosevelt (1858–1919) Theodore Roosevelt Sr. Martha Bulloch	Yes	Yes	Yes	Yes					Yes			Yes	Yes	Claes Maartenszen van Rosenvelt (5th great-grandfather); Netherlands → New Amsterdam, New Netherland (c. 1649)	
27	William Howard Taft (1857–1930) Alphonso Taft Louisa Maria Torrey		Yes										Yes		Robert Taft Sr. (4th great-grandfather); County Louth, Ireland → Braintree, Massachusetts Bay Colony (c. 1675)	
28	Woodrow Wilson (1856–1924) Joseph Ruggles Wilson Janet E. Woodrow									Yes			Yes		James Wilson (grandfather); Ulster, Ireland → Philadelphia, Pennsylvania (c. 1795)	
29	Warren G. Harding (1865–1923) George Tryon Harding Phoebe Elizabeth Dickerson	Yes	Yes							Yes				Yes	Richard Harding (8th great grandfather) Northampton, England → Braintree, Massachusetts Bay Colony (1623)	
30	Calvin Coolidge (1872–1933) John Calvin Coolidge Sr. Victoria Josephine Moor		Yes											Yes	John Coolidge (7th great-grandfather); Cottenham, England → Watertown, Massachusetts Bay Colony (c. 1635)	
31	Herbert Hoover (1874–1964) Jesse Clark Hoover Hulda Randall Minthorn		Yes		Yes							Yes		Yes	Andreas Huber (3rd great-grandfather); Ellerstadt, Holy Roman Empire → Province of Pennsylvania (1738)	
32	Franklin D. Roosevelt (1882–1945) James Roosevelt I Sara Ann Delano	Yes	Yes	Yes						Yes					Claes Maartenszen van Rosenvelt (5th great-grandfather); Netherlands → New Amsterdam, New Netherland (c. 1649)	
33	Harry S. Truman (1884–1972) John Anderson Truman Martha Ellen Young		Yes	Yes	Yes					Yes			Yes		Unknown	
34	Dwight D. Eisenhower (1890–1969) David Jacob Eisenhower Ida Elizabeth Stover				Yes							Yes			Johann Peter Eisenhauer (2nd great-grandfather); Karlsbrunn, Holy Roman Empire → York, Province of Pennsylvania (1741)	
35	John F. Kennedy (1917–1963) Joseph Patrick Kennedy Sr. Rose Elizabeth Fitzgerald						Yes								Patrick Kennedy (great-grandfather); New Ross, Ireland → Boston, Massachusetts (c. 1848)	
36	Lyndon B. Johnson (1908–1973) Samuel Ealy Johnson Jr. Rebekah Baines		Yes	Yes	Yes					Yes			Yes		Unknown	
37	Richard Nixon (1913–1994) Francis Anthony Nixon Hannah Elizabeth Milhous		Yes		Yes								Yes	Yes	James Nixon (4th great-grandfather) Northern Ireland → Brandywine Hundred, Delaware (1731)	
38	Gerald Ford (1913–2006) Leslie Lynch King Sr. Dorothy Ayer Gardner		Yes						Yes	Yes					Philip King; Devonshire, England → Philadelphia, Province of Pennsylvania (1730)	
39	Jimmy Carter (1924–2024) James Earl Carter Sr. Bessie Lillian Gordy		Yes							Yes			Yes		Thomas Carter (8th great-grandfather); Kings Langley, England → Colony of Virginia (c. 1635)	
40	Ronald Reagan (1911–2004) John Edward Reagan Nelle Clyde Wilson		Yes				Yes			Yes					Michael O'Regan (great-grandfather); County Tipperary, Ireland → London, England (1852); London, England → Carroll County, Illinois (1856)	
41	George H. W. Bush (1924–2018) Prescott Sheldon Bush Dorothy Wear Walker	Yes	Yes	Yes	Yes		Yes			Yes	Yes		Yes		John Bush (7th great-grandfather Messing, England → Massachusetts Bay Colony (c. 1640)	
42	Bill Clinton (born 1946) William Jefferson Blythe Jr. Virginia Dell Cassidy		Yes				Yes						Yes		Unknown	
43	George W. Bush (born 1946) George Herbert Walker Bush Barbara Pierce	Yes	Yes	Yes	Yes		Yes			Yes	Yes		Yes		John Bush (8th great-grandfather) Messing, England → Massachusetts Bay Colony (c. 1640)	
44	Barack Obama (born 1961) Barack Hussein Obama Sr. Stanley Ann Dunham		Yes	Yes	Yes		Yes	Yes		Yes		Yes	Yes	Yes	Barack Obama Sr. (father); Nyang'oma Kogelo, Kenya Colony → Honolulu, Hawaii (1959)	
45/47	Donald Trump (born 1946) Frederick Christ Trump Sr. Mary Anne MacLeod				Yes					Yes					Frederick Trump (grandfather); Kallstadt, Germany → New York City, New York (1885)	
46	Joe Biden (born 1942) Joseph Robinette Biden Sr. Catherine Eugenia Finnegan		Yes	Yes			Yes								William Biden (3rd great-grandfather); Westbourne, England → Baltimore, Maryland (c. 1820)	

== See also ==
- Ancestral background of vice presidents of the United States
- African heritage of presidents of the United States
- Most royal candidate theory
- Lists of Americans (lists of people from the United States by various criteria, including ethnic or national origin)
