= Ancestral background of vice presidents of the United States =

This is a list of ancestral origins of the people who have served as Vice President of the United States. Similarly to the Presidency of the United States, most holders of the office of the Vice Presidency have come from prominent or wealthy families of predominantly Northern European and Protestant backgrounds. In the American political system Vice Presidential candidates have historically been chosen either by a political party, or by a presidential nominee. Because of this, their ethnic and geographic background can play heavily into their selection, either in an effort to double down on a key electoral base, or to potentially expand the appeal of a presidential ticket to a wider demographic group.

== Ancestry table ==
Summary:

- (British) English (England) : 41
- (British) Scottish (Scotland) : 19
- (British) Ulster Scots: 16
- (British) Welsh (Wales) : 13
- French (France) : 9
- German (Germany) : 8
- Irish (Republic of Ireland) : 6
- Dutch (Netherlands) : 8
- Norwegian (Norway) : 2
- Danish (Denmark) : 1
- Greek (Greece) : 1
- Indian (India) : 1
- Jamaican (Jamaica) : 1
- Kaw: 1
- (British) Manx (Isle of Man) : 1
- Osage: 1
- Polish (Poland) : 1
- Potawatomi: 1
- Swedish (Sweden) : 1

No.	Vice President and parents	(Denmark) Danish	(Netherlands) Dutch	(England) English	(France) French	(Germany) German	(Greece) Greek	(India) Indian	(Republic of Ireland) Irish	(Jamaica) Jamaican	Kaw	(Isle of Man) Manx	(Norway) Norwegian	Osage	(Poland) Polish	Potawatomi	(Scotland) Scottish	(Sweden) Swedish	Ulster Scots	(Wales) Welsh	Citation
1. (1789–1797)	John Adams (1735–1826); John Adams Sr. Susanna Boylston			Yes																Yes	
2. (1797–1801)	Thomas Jefferson (1743–1826); Peter Jefferson; Jane Randolph			Yes													Yes			Yes	
3. (1801–1805)	Aaron Burr (1756–1836); Aaron Burr Sr. Esther Edwards			Yes																Yes	
4. (1805–1812)	George Clinton (1739–1812); Charles Clinton; Elizabeth Denniston								Yes												
5. (1813–1814)	Elbridge Gerry (1744–1814); Thomas Gerry; Elizabeth Greenleaf			Yes																	
6. (1817–1825)	Daniel D. Thompkins (1774–1825); Jonathan Griffin Tompkins; Sarah Ann Hyatt			Yes																Yes	
7. (1825–1832)	John C. Calhoun (1782–1850); Patrick Calhoun; Martha Caldwell																		Yes		
8. (1833–1837)	Martin Van Buren (1782–1862); Abraham Van Buren; Maria Hoes		Yes																		
9. (1837–1841)	Richard Mentor Johnson (1780–1850); Robert Johnson; Jemima Suggett			Yes	Yes												Yes				
10. (1841–1841)	John Tyler (1790–1862); John Tyler Sr. Mary Marot Armistead			Yes	Yes																
11. (1845–1849)	George M. Dallas (1792–1864); Alexander James Dallas; Arabella Maria Smith			Yes													Yes				
12. (1849–1850)	Millard Fillmore (1800–1874); Nathaniel Fillmore; Phoebe Millard			Yes																	
13. (1853–1853)	William R. King (1786–1853); William King; Margaret DeVane			Yes					Yes								Yes				
14. (1867–1861)	John C. Breckinridge (1821–1875); Cabell Breckinridge; Mary Clay Smith			Yes													Yes				
15. (1861–1865)	Hannibal Hamlin (1809–1891); Cyrus Hamlin; Anna Livermore			Yes																	
16. (1865–1865)	Andrew Johnson (1808–1875); Jacob Johnson; Mary McDonough			Yes					Yes								Yes		Yes		
17. (1869–1873)	Schuyler Colfax (1823–1875); Schuyler Colfax Sr. Hannah Stryker		Yes																		
18. (1873–1875)	Henry Wilson (1812–1875); Winthrop Colbath; Abigail Witham			Yes																	
19. (1877–1881)	William A. Wheeler (1819–1887); Almon Wheeler; Eliza Woodward	Yes	Yes	Yes																	
20. (1881–1881)	Chester A. Arthur (1829–1886); William Arthur; Malvina Stone			Yes															Yes	Yes	
21. (1885–1885)	Thomas A. Hendricks (1819–1885); John Hendricks; Jane Thomson		Yes														Yes				
22. (1889–1893)	Levi P. Morton (1824–1920); Daniel Oliver Morton; Lucretia Parsons			Yes																	
23. (1893–1897)	Adlai Stevenson I (1835-1914); John Turner Stevenson; Eliza Ann Ewing																Yes		Yes		
24. (1897–1899)	Garret Hobart (1844–1899); Addison Willard Hobart; Sophia Vanderveer			Yes																	
25. (1901–1901)	Theodore Roosevelt (1858–1919); Theodore Roosevelt Sr. Martha Bulloch		Yes	Yes	Yes	Yes											Yes		Yes	Yes	
26. (1905–1909)	Charles W. Fairbanks (1852–1918); Loriston Monroe Fairbanks; Mary Adelaide Smith			Yes													Yes				
27. (1909–1912)	James S. Sherman (1855–1912); Richard Updike Sherman; Mary Frances Sherman			Yes																	
28. (1913–1921)	Thomas R. Marshall (1854–1925); Daniel M. Marshall; Martha E. Patterson			Yes													Yes		Yes	Yes	
29. (1921–1923)	Calvin Coolidge (1872–1933); John Calvin Coolidge Sr. Victoria Josephine Moor			Yes																Yes	
30. (1925–1929)	Charles G. Dawes (1865–1951); Rufus R. Dawes; Mary Beman Gates			Yes																Yes	
31. (1929–1933)	Charles Curtis (1860–1936); Orren Arms Curtis; Ellen Pappan			Yes	Yes						Yes			Yes		Yes	Yes			Yes	
32. (1933–1941)	John Nance Garner (1868–1967); John Nance Garner Jr. Sarah Jane Guest			Yes													Yes				
33. (1941–1945)	Henry A. Wallace (1888–1965); Henry Cantwell Wallace; Carrie May Brodhead			Yes															Yes		
34. (1945–1945)	Harry S. Truman (1884–1972); John Anderson Truman; Martha Ellen Young			Yes	Yes	Yes											Yes		Yes		
35. (1949–1953)	Alben W. Barkley (1877-1956); John Wilson Barkley; Electa Eliza Smith																		Yes		
36. (1953–1961)	Richard Nixon (1913–1994); Francis Anthony Nixon; Hannah Elizabeth Milhous			Yes		Yes													Yes	Yes	
37. (1961–1963)	Lyndon B. Johnson (1908–1973); Samuel Ealy Johnson Jr. Rebekah Baines			Yes	Yes	Yes											Yes		Yes		
38. (1965–1969)	Hubert Humphrey (1911–1978); Hubert Horatio Humphrey Sr. Ragnild Kristine Sannes			Yes									Yes								
39. (1969–1973)	Spiro Agnew (1918-1996); Theodore Spiros Agnew; Margaret Marian Akers			Yes			Yes														
40. (1973–1974)	Gerald R. Ford (1913–2006); Leslie Lynch King Sr. Dorothy Ayer Gardner			Yes											Yes		Yes				
41. (1974–1977)	Nelson Rockefeller (1908–1979); John Davison Rockefeller Jr. Abigail Greene Aldrich		Yes	Yes		Yes													Yes	Yes	
42. (1977–1981)	Walter Mondale (1928–2021); Theodore Sigvaard Mondale; Claribel Hope Cowan			Yes		Yes							Yes				Yes				
43. (1981–1989)	George H. W. Bush (1924–2018); Prescott Sheldon Bush; Dorothy Wear Walker		Yes	Yes	Yes	Yes											Yes	Yes	Yes		
44. (1989–1993)	Dan Quayle (born 1947); James Cline Quayle; Martha Corinne Pulliam			Yes								Yes									
45. (1993–2001)	Al Gore (born 1948); Albert Arnold Gore Sr. Pauline Annette LaFon			Yes													Yes		Yes		
46. (2001–2009)	Dick Cheney (1941–2025); Richard Herbert Cheney; Marjorie Lorraine Dickey				Yes				Yes											Yes	
47. (2009–2017)	Joe Biden (born 1942); Joseph Robinette Biden Sr. Catherine Eugenia Finnegan			Yes	Yes				Yes												
48. (2017–2021)	Mike Pence (born 1959); Edward Joseph Pence Jr. Ann Jane Cawley			Yes		Yes			Yes												
49. (2021–2025)	Kamala Harris (born 1964); Donald Jasper Harris; Shyamala Gopalan							Yes		Yes									Yes		
50. (2025–present)	JD Vance (born 1984); Donald Ray Bowman; Beverly Carol Vance		Yes	Yes															Yes		

== See also ==
- Ancestral background of presidents of the United States
