= John Kellogg (actor) =

American actor

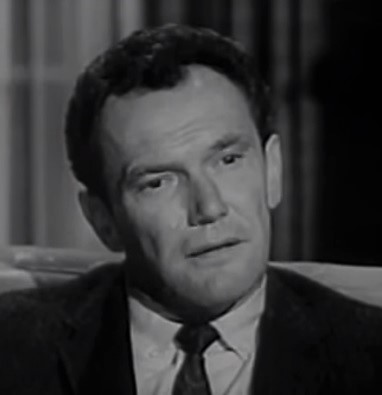
- Born: June 3, 1916; Los Angeles, California, U.S.
- Died: February 22, 2000 (aged 83); Los Angeles, California, U.S.
- Occupation: Actor
- Years active: 1930s–1990
- Children: 3
- Relatives: Charles Henry King (grandfather); Leslie Lynch King Sr. (uncle); Gerald Ford (cousin); Betty Ford (cousin-in-law); Steven Ford (first cousin, once removed; Susan Ford Bales (first cousin, once removed)

Giles Vernon "John" Kellogg Jr. (June 3, 1916 – February 22, 2000) was an American actor in film, stage, and television.

== Biography ==
Giles Vernon Kellogg Jr. was born on June 3, 1916, in Los Angeles, California, to Giles Vernon Kellogg Sr. and Marietta Hughes Kellogg (née King). His parents married in 1914, divorced in 1918, and remarried in 1920. Kellogg’s father was the son of Giles Kellogg, secretary of the Union Oil Company of California. His mother was the daughter of Charles Henry King, a prominent businessman and banker who was the father of Leslie Lynch King Sr., Gerald Ford’s father.

Kellogg began his acting career in the 1930s as Giles V. Kellogg, starring in the long-running comedy Brother Rat. Meanwhile, he acted on stage in several plays until World War II broke out. He turned to the film industry, playing bit parts in several films. In 1946, he signed a contract at Columbia Pictures. Throughout his career, Kellogg played mostly secondary roles. In a Season 6 episode of Bonanza, he played "Frank Reed" alongside Dan Duryea in "Logan's Treasure". In 1969 Kellogg appeared as Mel Dover on the TV western The Virginian in the Episode titled Stopover.

Kellogg died in Los Angeles in 2000 of Alzheimer's disease.

== Selected filmography ==
In the 1950s and 1960s, Kellogg was mostly seen on television. He guest starred in several TV series, including three episodes of Adventures of Superman (coincidentally and prominently sponsored by Kellogg's). He is most famous for his portrayal of bad guy Jack Chandler in the soap opera Peyton Place, a role he played between 1966 and 1967.

In 1966 he starred as murderous bank robbing cowboy “T.R. Stark” in a rare two-part episode of Gunsmoke called “The Raid” (Season 11 Episode 18 and Episode 19) along with actors John Anderson, Michael Conrad, Jim Davis, Richard Jaeckel, and Gary Lockwood.

- High School (1940) - Tommy Lee
- Young Tom Edison (1940) - Bill Edison
- Sailor's Lady (1940) - Sailor (uncredited)
- Yesterday's Heroes (1940) - Ticket Seller (uncredited)
- The Monster and the Girl (1941) - Cub Reporter (uncredited)
- Knockout (1941) - Murphy, a Fighter (uncredited)
- Mob Town (1941) - Brick (uncredited)
- Among the Living (1941) - Reporter (uncredited)
- Pacific Blackout (1941) - Bombardier Sergeant (uncredited)
- Captains of the Clouds (1942) - Aircraftsman Lawrence (uncredited)
- To Be or Not to Be (1942) - Polish RAF Flyer (uncredited)
- Come on Danger (1942) - Kid (uncredited)
- The Pride of the Yankees (1942) - Fraternity Boy (uncredited)
- Wing and a Prayer (1944) - Assistant Air Officer (uncredited)
- Thirty Seconds Over Tokyo (1944) - C-47 Transport Pilot (uncredited)
- This Man's Navy (1945) - Junior Pilot (uncredited)
- Main Street After Dark (1945) - Soldier Assisting Police (uncredited)
- The Crimson Canary (1945) - Keys
- What Next, Corporal Hargrove? (1945) - Wilkins (uncredited)
- A Walk in the Sun (1945) - Riddle
- Because of Him (1946) - Reporter (uncredited)
- Miss Susie Slagle's (1946) - Dark-Haired Boy (uncredited)
- Without Reservations (1946) - Reporter (uncredited)
- Somewhere in the Night (1946) - Hospital Medical Attendant
- The Strange Love of Martha Ivers (1946) - Joe (uncredited)
- Johnny O'Clock (1947) - Charlie
- Out of the Past (1947) - Charlie Cook
- Suddenly It's Spring (1947) - Newsreel Man (uncredited)
- Mr. District Attorney (1947) - Franzen
- King of the Wild Horses (1947) - Danny Taggert
- Robin Hood of Texas (1947) - Nick
- The Gangster (1947) - Sterling
- Out of the Past (1947) - Lou Baylord (uncredited)
- Killer McCoy (1947) - Svengross - Pool Player (uncredited)
- Secret Service Investigator (1948) - Benny Deering
- Sinister Journey (1948) - Lee Garvin
- Fighting Back (1948) - Sam Lang
- Station West (1948) - Ben
- Bad Men of Tombstone (1949) - Curly
- The Doolins of Oklahoma (1949) - Townsman (uncredited)
- Hold That Baby! (1949) - Mason
- House of Strangers (1949) - Danny (uncredited)
- Port of New York (1949) - Lenny
- Samson and Delilah (1949) - Temple Spectator (uncredited)
- Twelve O'Clock High (1949) - Major Cobb
- Bunco Squad (1950) - Fred Reed
- Kansas Raiders (1950) - Red Leg leader
- The Du Pont Story (1950) - John (uncredited)
- Hunt the Man Down (1950) - Kerry 'Lefty' McGuire
- The Enforcer (1951) - Vince
- Tomorrow Is Another Day (1951) - Dan Monroe
- Come Fill the Cup (1951) - Don Bell
- Elephant Stampede (1951) - Bob Warren
- The Greatest Show on Earth (1952) - Harry
- Rancho Notorious (1952) - Jeff Factor
- Jet Job (1952) - Alvin Fanchon
- The Raiders (1952) - Jack Welch
- The Silver Whip (1953) - Slater
- Fighting Lawman (1953) - Lem Slade, a.k.a. Sam Logan
- Those Redheads from Seattle (1953) - Mike Yurkil
- Gorilla at Large (1954) - Morse
- African Manhunt (1955) - Sergeant Jed Drover
- Edge of the City (1957) - Detective
- Laramie (1960) (Season 2 Episode 4: "Ride the Wild Wind") - Pike
- Go Naked in the World (1961) - Cobby, Hotel Detective
- Maverick (1961) (Season 4 Episode 20: "The Ice Man") - Ben Stricker
- Convicts 4 (1962) - Guard #2
- Gunsmoke (1962-1969) (6 episodes)
  - (Season 7 Episode 26: "Durham Bull") (1962) - Silva
  - (Season 9 Episode 9: "Ex-Con") (1963) - Leo
  - (Season 11 Episode 18: "The Raid: Part 1") (1966) - T.R. Stark
  - (Season 11 Episode 19: "The Raid: Part 2") (1966) - T.R. Stark
  - (Season 13 Episode 16: "The Victim") (1968) - Sheriff Joe Wood
  - (Season 14 Episode 23: "The Intruder") (1969) - Henry Decker
- Rawhide (1963) (Season 5 Episode 20: "Incident of Judgment Day") - Leslie Bellamy
- Bonanza (1963-1968) (5 episodes)
  - (Season 5 Episode 6: "A Question of Strength") (1963) - Stager
  - (Season 5 Episode 24: "No Less a Man") (1964) - Bud Wagner
  - (Season 6 Episode 5: "Logan's Treasure") (1964) - Frank Reed
  - (Season 9 Episode 3: "The Conquistadores") (1967) - Bill Anderson
  - (Season 10 Episode 3: "Salute to Yesterday") (1968) - Sergeant Ordy
- The Alfred Hitchcock Hour (1964) (Season 2 Episode 18: "Final Escape") - First Guard
- The Wild Wild West (1968) (Season 3 Episode 22: "The Night of the Amnesiac") - Rusty
- Knife for the Ladies (1974) - Hollyfield
- Blind Justice (1986) - Jim's Father
- Violets Are Blue (1986) - Ralph Sawyer
- Orphans (1987) - Barney

== Personal life ==
Kellogg married Gwen Horn in Arizona in 1939. They had one son, Steven (born 1940), before divorcing. He married actress Linda Brent but obtained a Mexican divorce from her on April 19, 1949, marrying singer Helen Cogan that same day. They had one daughter, Cheryl (born 1949), before their marriage was annulled on June 18, 1951. Afterwards, Kellogg married his fourth wife, Barbara, and they had one daughter, Sharon Lee.

Kellogg died on February 22, 2000, at Cedars-Sinai Medical Center in Los Angeles of Alzheimer's disease.
