= James Paxson =

James or Jim Paxson may refer to:

- James M. Paxson (died 1995), American businessman
- Jim Paxson Sr. (1932–2014), American basketball player
- Jim Paxson (born 1957), American basketball player
