= Gerald R. Ford Birthsite and Gardens =

Historic site in Omaha, Nebraska, United States

Coordinates: 41.245329°N 95.959954°W

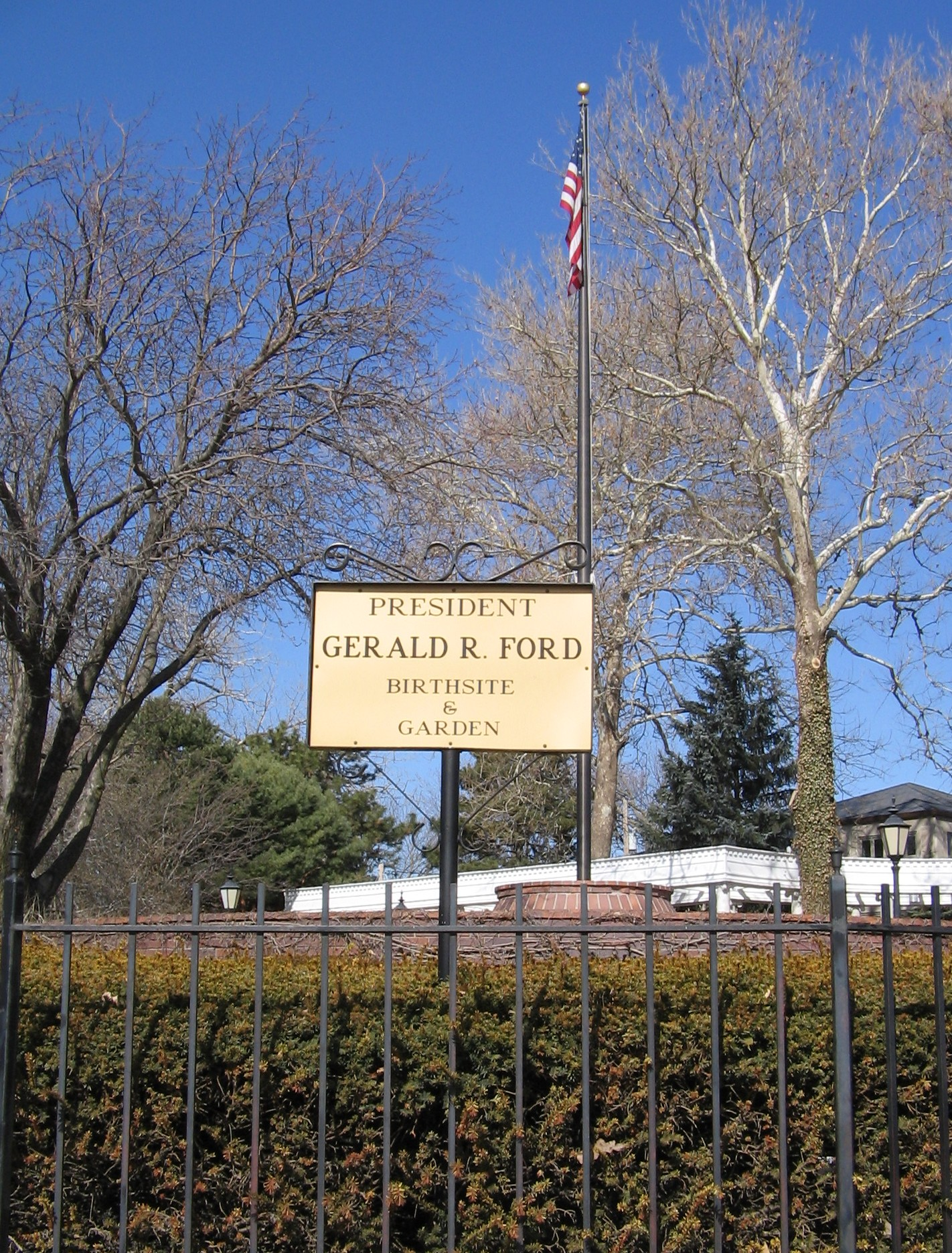
Site as of 2006.

The Gerald R. Ford Birthsite and Gardens in Omaha, Nebraska, marks the location of the house at 3202 Woolworth Avenue where U.S. president Gerald R. Ford lived for a couple of weeks after his birth in July 1913. It was the home of his paternal grandparents, Charles Henry and Martha King.

== History ==
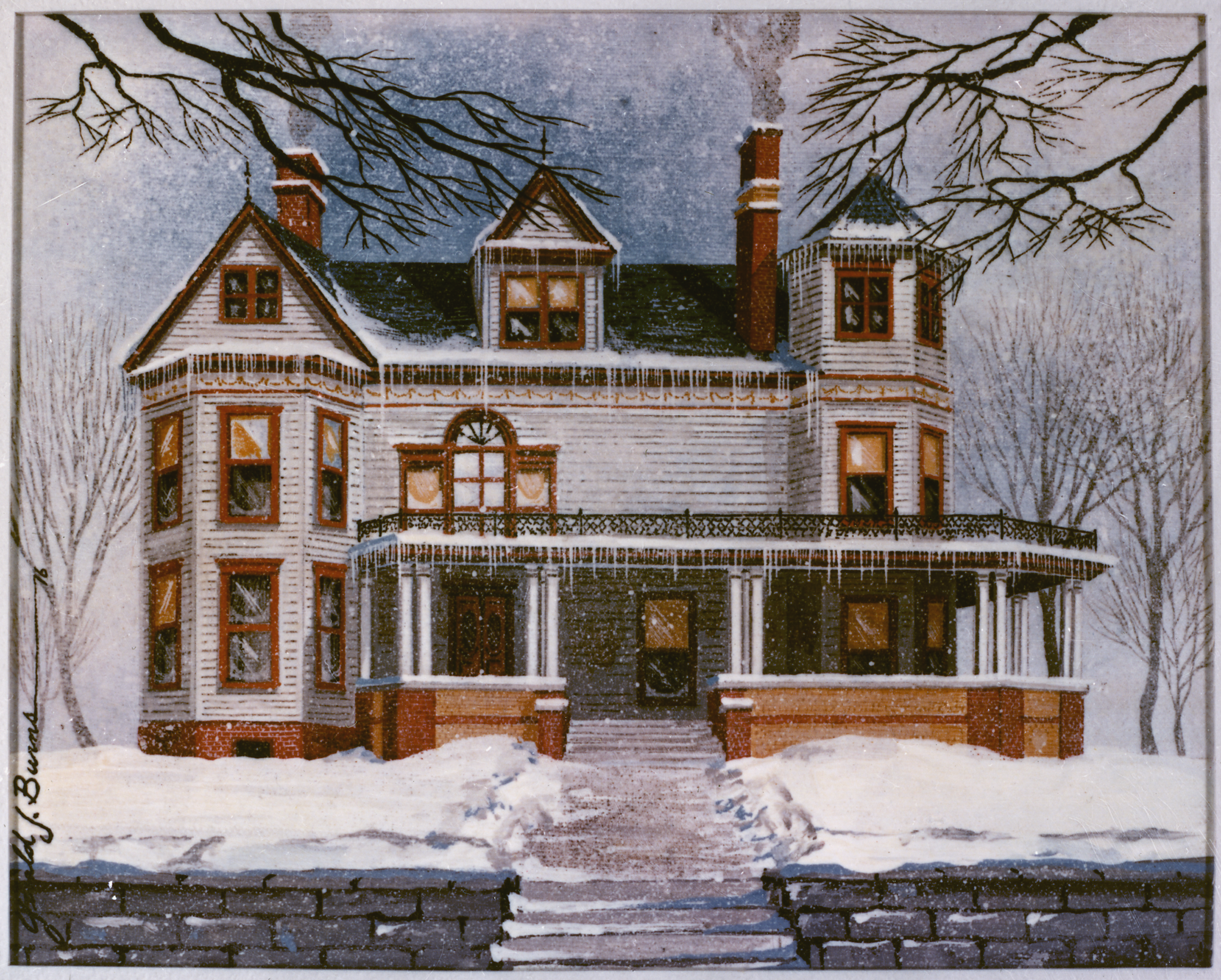
Painting of the house.

The King house at 3202 Woolworth Avenue was located on the border of the Hanscom Park and Field Club neighborhoods of Midtown Omaha. A three-story, fourteen-room Victorian mansion, it was razed after a 1971 fire caused substantial damage.

Omaha businessman James M. Paxson, who lived in the neighborhood, purchased the vacant lot for $17,250 after Ford became president in 1974, and planned for it to be used as a memorial. Although Paxson donated the site to the city, officials said they couldn't afford to build a memorial. Paxson then set up the Paxson Foundation to fund the memorial and associated gardens. The site includes a portico evoking the north side of the White House and a pagoda resembling a portion of the original home.

== Memorial and conservation center ==
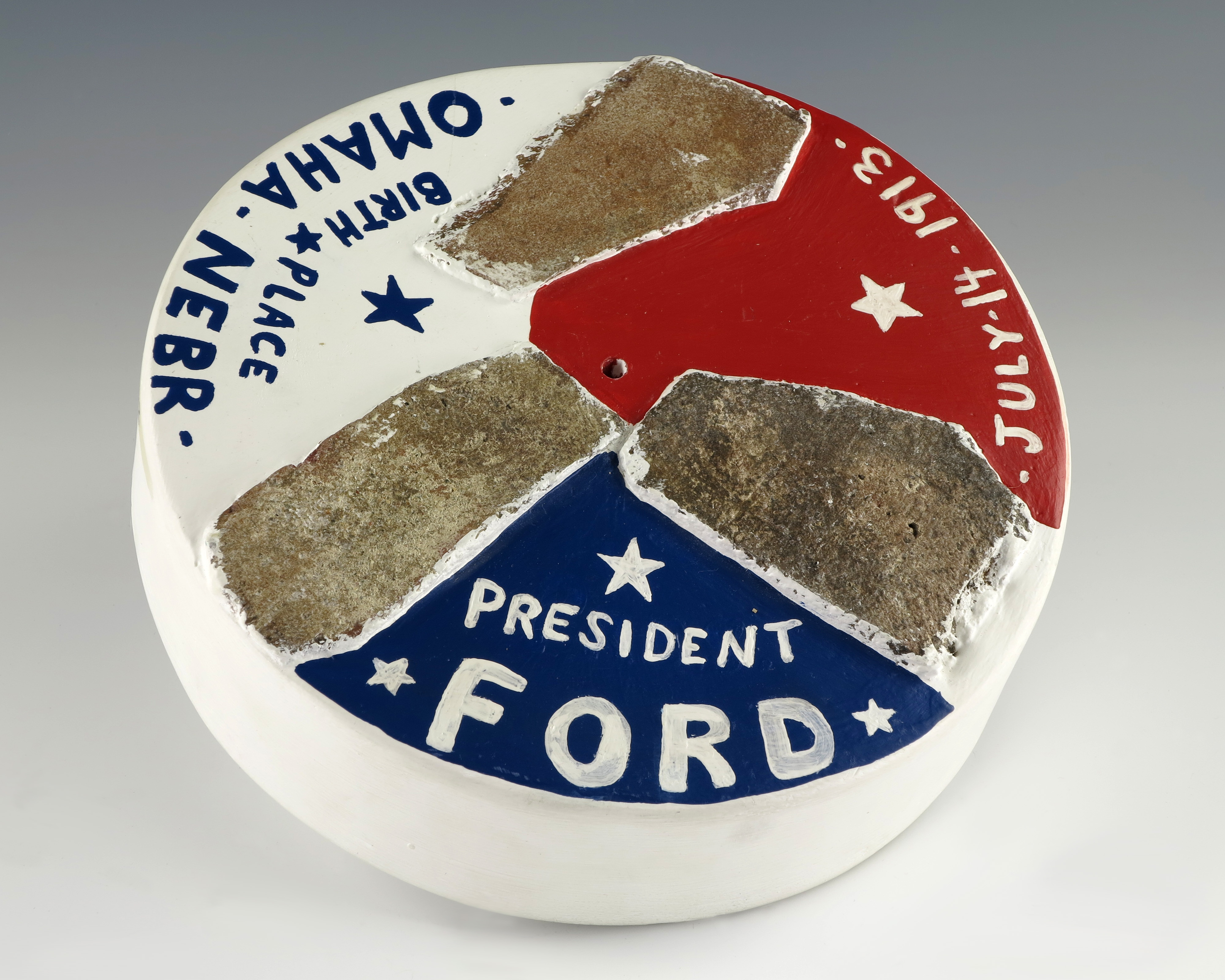
Plaster of Paris disc composed of three pieces of bricks from Gerald R. Ford's birthplace in Omaha, Nebraska.

The memorial was dedicated in 1977. Ford partnered with Paxson on some fundraising. The former president returned in 1980 for the dedication of a rose garden in honor of Betty Ford. An exhibit kiosk contains information about Ford.

Adjoining the site is the Gerald R. Ford Conservation Center, a regional center of the Nebraska State Historical Society founded in 1995. It provides conservation services for historic and artistic works. The Center also contains a small exhibit of Ford memorabilia. Both conservation and exhibit are available by appointment only.

The two sites are just to the northwest of Hanscom Park, one of Omaha's oldest public parks. The house site is four blocks west of the Gerald R. Ford Expressway.

== Family history ==
The house was owned by the future president's paternal grandparents, Charles Henry King, a prominent banker, and his wife, the former Martha Alicia Porter. After their son Leslie Lynch King married Dorothy Ayer Gardner on September 7, 1912, the young couple moved into the house with his parents, as was typical of the times. Their son, named Leslie Lynch King, Jr. was born July 14, 1913.

Due to domestic abuse, Dorothy Gardner separated from Leslie King when Leslie, Jr. was only 16 days old. After staying briefly with a sister in Illinois, Dorothy took her son with her to her parents and moved in with them in Grand Rapids, Michigan, where the future president grew up. By the end of 1913 Dorothy's divorce from Leslie King was final. In 1916, Dorothy married Gerald Rudolff Ford. They renamed Leslie, Jr. after him, as Gerald Rudolff Ford, Jr. The future president was never formally adopted, however, and he did not legally change his name until 1935; he also used a more conventional spelling of his middle name (Rudolph).

== See also ==
- List of residences of presidents of the United States
