= Harold Brooks-Baker =

American journalist

Harold Brooks Baker (later Brooks-Baker; 16 November 1933 – 5 March 2005), was an American-British financier, journalist, and publisher, and self-proclaimed expert on genealogy.

== Early life and education ==
Born a United States citizen, the son of (Charles) Silas Baker (1888–1943), a Washington, D.C. attorney, and his wife, Elizabeth Lambert, Brooks-Baker contracted polio as a child, and nearly died; he never fully recovered from the physical effects of this illness. He attended Trinity College in Hartford, Connecticut and Harvard University, in the same class as Ted Kennedy.

== Career ==
Brooks-Baker became a bond trader and settled in London in the 1960s. In 1974 he and his business partners took over Debrett's, publisher of several titles on British aristocracy including Debrett’s Peerage & Baronetage.

In 1984 he moved to Burke's Peerage Partnership as director of publishing. The partnership had been in poor financial health for years and had already sold its flagship publication, Burke's Peerage, Baronetage & Knightage. Brooks-Baker was never associated with Burke's Peerage, Baronetage & Knightage, but oversaw the publication of books about genealogy and the aristocracy including Burke's Presidential Families of the United States of America. The company's major business was genealogical research.

As public relations for Burke's, he was a frequent commentator on the British royal family and aristocracy in the British press. He was famous for his ostentatious and oft-disputed pronouncements regarding British royalty, and for his advocacy of the most royal candidate theory of U.S. presidential succession. In 1986, he also controversially endorsed in a letter written to the British Prime Minister, Margaret Thatcher, a claimed British royal ancestral connection with the Muslim prophet Muhammad. The Daily Telegraph would say in his obituary, "[H]is great advantage for journalists was that he was always available to make an arresting comment; his disadvantage was that he was often wrong."

== Personal life ==
In 1964, Brooks-Baker married Irene Marie, daughter of French Count Robert Elliott Le Gras du Luart de Montsaulnin; they had two daughters; Nadia Elizabeth (b. 1965), who married Gregory, Jonkheer van Loudon, and Natasha Yolande D. (b. 1968). Having divorced his first wife, in 1997 he married Catherine Mary, daughter of agricultural economist and artist Edmund Neville-Rolfe, and sister of Conservative politician Lucy Neville-Rolfe, Baroness Neville-Rolfe. Brooks-Baker preferred to be known as "Brookie" (to the extent that the record of his death in 2005 was made under both his real name and 'Brookie Brooks-Baker'). He adopted the "Brooks-" part of his surname when the French authorities refused him permission to add the family name "Brooks" as a middle name for his daughters. He was often credited as 'H. B. Brooks-Baker'. In later years, Brooks-Baker used a wheelchair, owing to lifelong ramifications from his childhood polio.
