= African heritage of presidents of the United States =

Claims and debunked claims of African-American heritage

This article includes information on the African heritage of presidents of the United States, together with information on unsubstantiated claims that certain presidents of the United States had African ancestry.

== Presidents with proven African ancestry ==
=== Barack Obama ===
Barack Obama, who served as the 44th president of the United States from 2009 to 2017, had an African father and an American mother of almost entirely European ancestry. His father, Barack Obama Sr. (1936–1982), was a Luo Kenyan from Nyang'oma Kogelo, Kenya. In July 2012, drawing on a combination of historical documents and Y-DNA analysis, Ancestry.com found a strong likelihood that Obama—through his mother, Stanley Ann Dunham—was descended from John Punch, known as the "first official slave in the English colonies", meaning that she too had African ancestry.

== Unsubstantiated claims that presidents had African ancestry ==
Claims that certain U.S. presidents other than Barack Obama had African or African-American ancestry have been made by professional historian J. A. Rogers, ophthalmologist Leroy William Vaughn, and psychologist Auset BaKhufu. All base their theories chiefly on the work of J. A. Rogers, who apparently self-published a pamphlet in 1965 claiming that five presidents of the United States, widely accepted as white, also had African ancestry. Historian Henry Louis Gates has written that Rogers's pamphlet "would get the 'Black History Wishful Thinking Prize,' hands down". Vaughn's and BaKhufu's books were also self-published.

Historians' and biographers' studies of these presidents have not supported such claims, and they lack empirical evidence. These authors are generally ignored by scholars. They have been classified as "rumormongers and amateur historians" as well as conspiracy theorists. Vaughn and BaKhufu have added little substantive research to their claims, but there have been more rumors of the potential African heritage of other presidents in the decades since Rogers published his pamphlet. These rumors are considered unsubstantiated and have not been acknowledged by historians.

=== Thomas Jefferson ===
Vaughn and others claim that Thomas Jefferson's mother Jane Randolph Jefferson was of mixed-race ancestry. The academic consensus does not support such claims. For example, in her recent analyses of historical evidence about the Hemings and Jeffersons, scholar Annette Gordon-Reed makes no claim of African descent in the Randolph family.

Specifically, Vaughn says, "The chief attack on Jefferson was in a book written by Thomas Hazard in 1867 called The Johnny Cake Papers. Hazard interviewed Paris Gardiner, who said he was present during the 1796 presidential campaign, when one speaker states that Thomas Jefferson was a "mean-spirited son of a half-breed Indian squaw and a Virginia mulatto father." An overlapping claim is that, in an 18th-century presidential campaign, someone speaking against Jefferson's candidacy and in favor of that of John Adams accused Jefferson of being "half Injun, half nigger, half Frenchman" and born to a "mulatto father" or slave and "a half-breed Indian squaw", this birth to a mulatto and an Indian allegedly "well-known in the neighbourhood where he was raised" but otherwise unproven. These claims are based on damning stories from Jefferson's political opponents and are best understood as race-baiting rather than evidence about his actual lineage.

The Thomas Jefferson Foundation, which owns and operates Monticello, the major public history site on Jefferson, characterizes Jefferson's parents this way: "His father Peter Jefferson was a successful planter and surveyor and his mother Jane Randolph a member of one of Virginia's most distinguished families." They describe the quote in The Johnny Cake Papers as one frequently repeated, but it is attributed in written sources to the 1800 rather than the 1796 election campaign and clearly is one made by political opponents. The Johnny Cake Papers were a collection of folk tales published in 1879, not 1867, and only one tale commented on Jefferson. Dixon Wecter, in his essay "Thomas Jefferson, The Gentle Radical," discusses various portrayals of Jefferson by his political enemies and mentions that "the Jonnycake [sic] Papers later burlesqued such caricatures..."

=== Andrew Jackson ===
Andrew Jackson referred to an accusation that his "Mother ... [was] held to public scorn as a prostitute who intermarried with a Negro, and [that his] ... eldest brother [was] sold as a slave in Carolina." Less specific was a rumor of Jackson having "colored blood", meaning having "Negro" ancestry; this rumor was unproven. Jackson's father was born in Carrickfergus, County Antrim, in current-day Northern Ireland, around 1738. Hendrik Booraem, Robert Remini, and H. W. Brands have agreed that he had no black ancestors.

=== Abraham Lincoln ===
Abraham Lincoln's mother Nancy Hanks was claimed to be of Somali descent, but has been proven to be white.

According to historian William E. Barton, a rumor "current in various forms in several sections of the South" was that Lincoln's biological father was Abraham Enloe, which Barton dismissed as "false". According to Doug Wead, Enloe made a public boast that he was Lincoln's real father, and Thomas Lincoln allegedly fought him, biting off a piece of his nose. Another claim was that Lincoln was "part Negro", but that was unproven. According to Lincoln's law partner William H. Herndon, Lincoln had "very dark skin", although "his cheeks were leathery and saffron-colored", "his face was ... sallow," and "his hair was dark, almost black". Around 1838–39, Abraham Lincoln described himself as a "long black fellow", and his "complexion" in 1859 as "dark", but whether he meant either in an ancestral sense is unknown. The anti-Lincoln Charleston Mercury described him as being "of ... the dirtiest complexion", as part of anti-abolitionist race-baiting. Rumors of Lincoln's alleged black racial heritage are considered unsubstantiated and have not been acknowledged by historians.

=== Warren G. Harding ===
Warren G. Harding was said to have African ancestry; one claim was by his political opponent William Estabrook Chancellor, a controversial and racist historian, who said that Harding's father was a mulatto, and that Harding's great-grandmother was black. During Harding's campaign, Democratic opponents spread rumors that Harding's great-great-grandfather was a West Indian black, and that other blacks might be found in his family tree. Chancellor publicized rumors, based on supposed family research but perhaps reflecting no more than local gossip. In an era when the "one-drop rule" would classify a person with any African ancestry as black, and black people in the South had been effectively disenfranchised, Harding's campaign manager responded, "no family in the state (of Ohio) has a clearer, a more honorable record than the Hardings', a blue-eyed stock from New England and Pennsylvania, the finest pioneer blood." "Many biographers have dismissed the rumors of Harding's mixed-race family as little more than a political scandal and Chancellor himself as a Democratic mudslinger and racist ideologue." According to Chancellor, Harding got his only academic degree from Iberia College, which had been "founded to educate fugitive slaves". The college was founded by abolitionist supporters in the Presbyterian Church in Ohio for students of both sexes and all races.

The rumors may have been sustained by a statement Harding allegedly made to newspaperman James W. Faulkner on the subject, which he perhaps meant to be dismissive: "How do I know, Jim? One of my ancestors may have jumped the fence." However, while there are gaps in the historical record, studies of his family tree have not found evidence of an African-American ancestor.

Genetic testing of Harding's descendants in 2015 determined, with more than a 95% percent chance of accuracy, that he lacked sub-Saharan African forebears within four previous generations.

=== Calvin Coolidge ===
Calvin Coolidge's mother Victoria Moor was claimed to be of a mixed-race family in Vermont. Vaughn noted that her surname was derived from "Moor", a European term for people of North Africa. He failed to note that another meaning of her surname is the landscape feature of moor or bog. People's surnames were often based on such landscape features when surnames became generally adopted in 14th-century England. Moor/Moore is a common name in England, Scotland, and Ireland.

=== Dwight D. Eisenhower ===
Dwight D. Eisenhower's mother was said to be of mixed blood from Africa and Europe. This claim seems to be ultimately based on nothing more than her appearance on an 1885 wedding photograph. Historians and biographers of Eisenhower had documented his parents' German and Swiss German ancestry and long history in America. Some of his immigrant ancestors settled in Pennsylvania in 1741 and later migrated west to Kansas.

== See also ==
- African-American candidates for President of the United States
- Ancestral background of presidents of the United States
- The first black president (Toni Morrison), 1998 description of U.S. president Bill Clinton by Nobel laureate Toni Morrison
- Urban legend
