= African-American candidates for President of the United States =

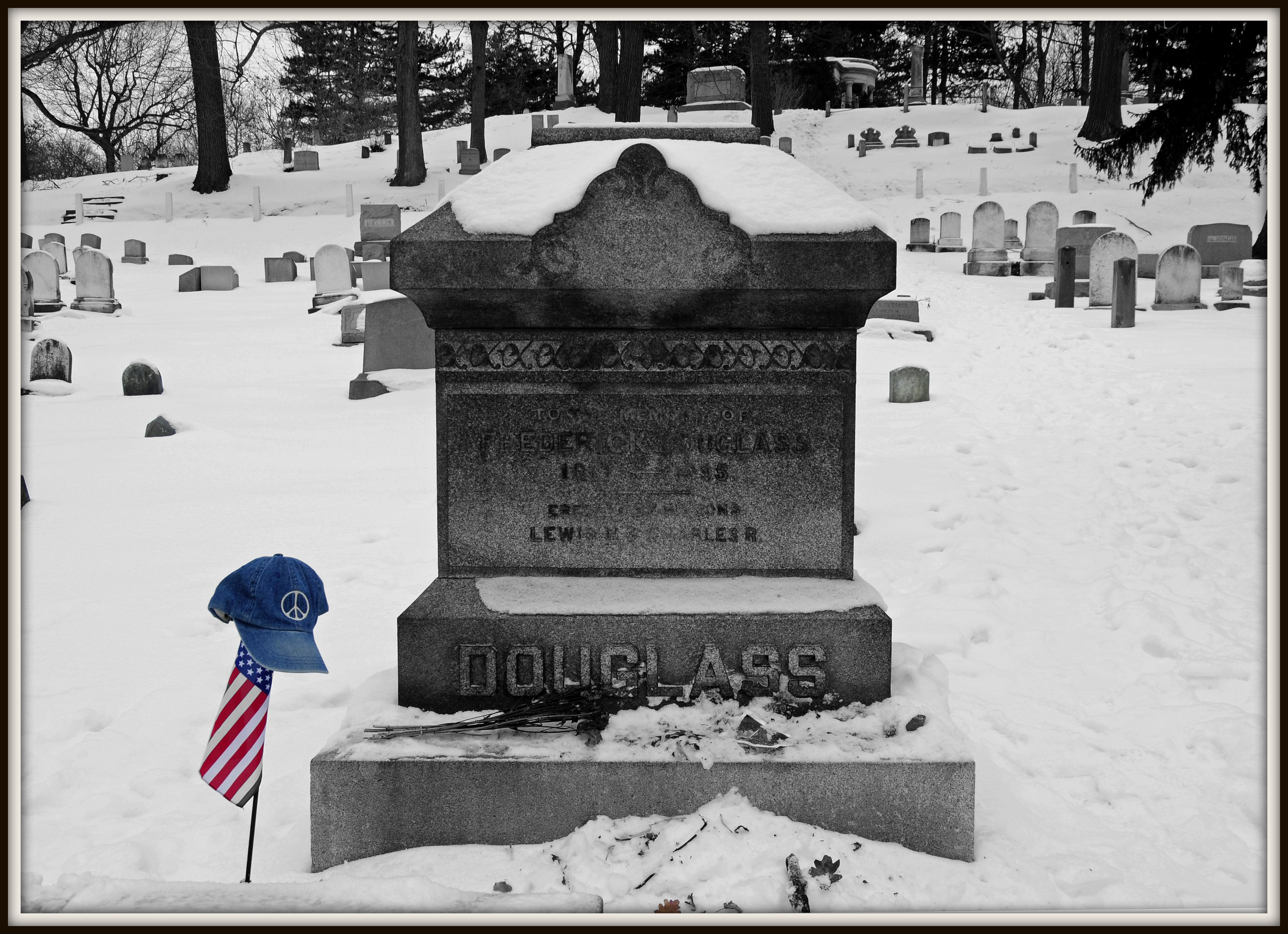
Frederick Douglass, 1818–1895

African American candidates for president of the United States from major parties include U.S. Senator Barack Obama (D-IL), elected president of the United States in 2008. He was the first African American to win a presidential election and the first African American to serve as president of the United States. He was re-elected in 2012. There had been several candidates in the years before.

== 19th century ==
=== Frederick Douglass ===
Frederick Douglass was invited to speak at the 1888 Republican National Convention. Afterward, during the roll call vote, he received one vote and was thus nominally considered a candidate for the presidency. In those years, candidates for the position and vice presidency were chosen by state representatives voting at the nominating convention. Many decisions were made through negotiations between state and party leaders "behind closed doors." Douglass was "never a contender" for the presidency in 1888 and had previously received a roll call vote in 1848 for a minor political party's presidential nomination.

== 20th century ==
=== George Edwin Taylor ===
In 1904, George Edwin Taylor was president of the National Negro Democratic League. Since 1890, White Southern Democrats had been enacting state laws or constitutional changes that effectively disfranchised most Black voters and were imposing segregation through “Jim Crow” laws. Northern Democrats seemed unwilling and unable to control the excesses of their Southern parties. The National Negro Democratic League was fractured by debates over whether to link the nation's currency to silver as well as gold. By 1904, Taylor was positioned to abandon the party and bureau that he had led as president for two terms. This was close to the nadir of race relations, when the number of lynchings of Blacks in the South was high. In addition, scientific racism was gaining acceptance within the nation's intellectual and scientific community.

In 1904 the executive committee of the newly formed National Negro Liberty Party asked "Judge" Taylor to be their candidate for the office of president of the United States. That party started in Little Rock, Arkansas, in 1897 when it was known as the Ex-Slave Petitioners’ Assembly. It was one of several leagues or assemblies that had formed at the end of the century to support bills working their way through the United States Congress to grant pensions to former slaves. These leagues claimed that membership in an association was required to qualify for a pension, if and when Congress passed such a bill. In 1900, that Assembly was reorganized as the National Industrial Council. In 1903 it added opposition to lynching, Jim Crow laws, disfranchisement, anti-imperialism, and scientific racism to its agenda, broadening its appeal to Black voters in Northern and Midwestern states. In 1904 the Council moved its headquarters from Arkansas to Chicago, Illinois, and reorganized as the National Negro Civil Liberty Party. It was following a growing wave of black migrants from the South to northern cities.

The first national convention of that new party convened in St. Louis, Missouri, in July 1904. It intended to field candidates in states that had sizeable Black populations. Its platform included planks that dealt with disfranchisement, insufficient career opportunities for Blacks in the United States military, imperialism, public ownership of railroads, “self-government” for the District of Columbia (Washington, D.C.), lynching and pensions for ex-slaves. The convention selected “Col.” William Thomas Scott of East St. Louis, Illinois, as its 1904 candidate for the office of president and William C. Payne, a little-known teacher from Warrenton, Virginia, as his vice-presidential running mate. The 37-year-old Payne, who later founded an industrial school in Puerto Rico, had served as a Cabin Steward on the USS Dixie during the Spanish–American War. After convention delegates had left St. Louis, Scott was arrested and jailed for having failed to pay a fine imposed in 1901. The party's executive committee turned to Taylor (who had just resigned as president of the National Negro Democratic League) to lead the party's ticket.

Taylor's campaign in 1904 was unsuccessful. The party was unable to gather 300 speakers to support his candidacy nor to field 6,000 candidates for local offices. No newspaper endorsed this party. State laws kept the party from listing candidates officially on election ballots. The party was unable to get Taylor's name added to any state ballot. The votes he received were not recorded in state records. William Scott later estimated that the party had received 65,000 votes nationwide, a number that could not be verified.

=== Channing E. Phillips ===
At the 1968 Democratic National Convention, held in Chicago, Channing E. Phillips, a minister and civil rights leader, was placed in nomination for President of the United States. He received 67.5 votes.

At the same convention, Julian Bond was nominated for vice president, the first African American to be nominated for that office by a major party. Bond, ineligible on account of being under the required age (35), withdrew.

=== Shirley Chisholm ===
In 1972, Shirley Chisholm, U.S. Congresswoman from New York, Barbadian-American (not African American) became the first black candidate for the Democratic Party and the first woman to run for the Democratic Party's presidential nomination. She participated in the Democratic primaries in numerous states. She campaigned in 12 states and won 28 delegates. In the balloting at the 1972 Democratic National Convention, she gained additional votes from disaffected Democrats and ended with a total of 152 delegates.

=== Jesse Jackson ===
In the 1984 presidential election and 1988 presidential election, Jesse Jackson was the first major-party black candidate to run nationwide primary campaigns and to win individual states' primaries or caucuses. He competed as a Democrat. In 1984, he garnered around 3 million votes in the primaries and 1988, about 7 million.

=== Alan Keyes ===
In 1992, Alan Keyes received a vote for the presidential nomination at the Republican National Convention. He did not campaign for President (he was the Republican nominee for U.S. Senate in Maryland that year). He became the first African-American candidate to run in the Republican presidential primaries in 1996, but he did not win any state's primary or caucus.

== 21st century ==
=== Barack Obama ===
Barack Obama was born to an American mother of European descent (except for at least one African ancestor in the colonial period - Punch) and an African father. His mother, Ann Dunham (1942–1995), was born in Wichita, Kansas; she was mostly of English descent, with some German, Irish, Scottish, Swiss, and Welsh ancestry. His father, Barack Obama Sr. (1936–1982), was a Luo Kenyan from Nyang'oma Kogelo. His parents had met and married in Hawai'i. They separated and divorced when he was a child.

Obama was identified as a potential candidate for president of the U.S. after his speech at the 2004 Democratic National Convention. A Democrat, Obama was elected to the U.S. Senate in 2004. The distinct possibility of an African American becoming elected was realized as the Democratic primary elections got underway in early 2008. Obama emerged as a serious contender for the nomination and was the first African American to win the designation of a major party in a United States presidential election. As the Democratic Party's nominee, he won the general election on November 4, 2008. On January 20, 2009, he was sworn in as the first African-American president of the United States. He was re-elected to a second term as president on November 6, 2012.

=== Other candidates ===
Alan Keyes ran for president again in 2000 and in 2008.

In 2004, Carol Moseley Braun and Al Sharpton were unsuccessful candidates in the Democratic primaries.

"Tea Party" Republican Herman Cain staged a run for the presidency in 2012. He received a brief surge of attention and popularity but withdrew before any primaries were held.

Neurosurgeon Ben Carson ran for the Republican nomination in the 2016 election. He polled well for a time in late 2015, but withdrew after the first Super Tuesday. Carson received 857,039 votes during the Republican primaries; this total represented 2.75% of the votes cast. He was supported by seven delegates at the Republican National Convention.

In early 2019, U.S. senators Kamala Harris (Note: Kamala Harris is an American of Jamaican and Tamil Indian descent. Her mother was a Tamil Indian breast-cancer scientist who immigrated to the United States from Madras, India, in 1960. Her father is a black Jamaican who emigrated from Jamaica to the U.S. in 1961.) and Cory Booker declared their presidential campaigns for the 2020 Democratic nomination within weeks of each other. Both withdrew from the race before any nominating contests were held. On December 3, 2019, Harris ended her presidential campaign, and Booker followed on January 13, 2020. Meanwhile, former Massachusetts governor Deval Patrick was a late entrant into the race for the Democratic presidential nomination.

On May 22, 2023, U.S. Senator Tim Scott announced his candidacy for the Republican nomination for the 2024 presidential election. He withdrew from the race before any nominating contests were held.

== Impact ==
The results of African-American presidential campaigns had ranged from winning the presidency to dropping out before primary voting began. However, all of the candidates have had a political impact by making sure their voices were a part of the national debate and gaining some attention from their party's establishment. Chisholm paved the way for African American and female candidates. Her goal was to make the Democratic Party more responsive to the people. When describing her reasons for running, Chisholm said, “I am not the candidate of black America, although I am black and proud. I am not the candidate of the women’s movement of this country, although I am a woman, and I am equally proud of that…I am the candidate of the people of America.” In the 1972 primary, Chisholm won more than 430,000 votes in fourteen states and 28 delegates at the Democratic Convention in Miami. Chisholm provided a boost to George McGovern, the eventual Democratic nominee when she campaigned for him after the convention. Chisholm's candidacy inspired many women and African Americans to make a difference in politics. As the first African American and woman to run for the nomination of a major party, Chisholm paved the way for Jesse Jackson Sr. who would be the next major African American candidate to run. For future candidates, Chisholm advised, “the next campaign by a woman or black must be well prepared, and well-financed; it must be planned long in advance, and it must aim at building a new coalition.”

Jesse Jackson seemed to follow Chisholm's advice in his 1984 run for president. His 1984 campaign sought to bring together a “Rainbow Coalition” of African Americans, Hispanics, the poor, the elderly, family farmers, and women that would challenge the conservative policies of President Ronald Reagan. Jackson placed third out of ten candidates for the Democratic nomination with more than 3 million primary votes. He won primaries or caucuses in four states and the District of Columbia. Jackson's campaign made progress by building on Chisholm's legacy. His 1984 campaign registered nearly 2 million voters of all racial backgrounds. By registering so many new voters, Jackson expanded the Democratic Party's base. He also inspired African American voters. Exit polls showed that nearly 12% of all Black voters were participating for the first time. Jackson's campaign won him a speaking slot at the 1984 Democratic Convention, which provided a national platform for him to present his agenda. In his 1988 campaign, Jackson increased his support to 6.9 million primary votes and won 9 states, the District of Columbia, and Puerto Rico.

Sharpton and Moseley Braun followed Jackson's campaign when they ran for the Democratic presidential nomination in 2004. Moseley Braun, having already made history as the only African American woman elected to the United States Senate became the most visible female candidate to run for the 2004 Democratic presidential nomination. She advocated for expanding opportunities and encouraged women to seek positions of power. “Now is the time for Democrats to renew hope that we will leave [the American Dream] for the next generation in even better shape than we found it,” Moseley Braun said, “And a woman can lead the way.” Though Moseley Braun ended her campaign in January 2004, she earned a speaking slot at the Democratic Convention in Boston where she had a national platform to advocate for equal rights.

Sharpton's 2004 campaign also focused on equal rights. In describing why he was running, Sharpton said, “ I think if we stand up for workers’ rights, stand up for a peace plan worldwide, stand up for the constitutional rights of every American, those people will come back [to the Democratic Party], and those people are the majority of Americans.” Like Moseley Braun, Sharpton's campaign allowed him to participate in the early nationally televised Democratic Party primary debates and earned him a speaking slot at the 2004 Democratic Convention, the same year future president Barack Obama gained national attention for his convention speech.

On the Republican side, Keyes first ran for the nomination in 1996 seeking to get his party to focus on social issues such as abortion. Keyes garnered a significant amount of free media during this campaign. The number of primary votes Keyes received increased from his 1996 campaign (471,716) to his 2000 campaign (914,548) but his vote total decreased in his 2008 primary run (58,977).

African American candidates have a variety of reasons for running for president. Some candidates run because they think they can win. Others run to influence the national debate by advocating for specific policy proposals. Some run for a combination of these reasons.

== See also ==
- African heritage of presidents of the United States
- List of African-American United States Senate candidates
