= Most royal candidate theory =

Presidential genealogy theory

The most royal candidate theory of Harold Brooks-Baker proposed that the winning candidate in United States presidential elections had always been the candidate with the greatest percentage of "royal blood" in his pedigree, and this pattern could be used to predict the outcome of upcoming elections. Brooks-Baker promoted it during several election cycles, ending with the 2004 presidential election, the last before his death.

== History ==
Every four years for a number of election cycles, Harold Brooks-Baker publicized his theory during the presidential election campaign, touring the talk circuit and expounding upon it. He gave examples of presidents whose losing opponents did not have royal blood (Ronald Reagan vs. Walter Mondale), or where he claimed the winner simply had "more royalty" (John F. Kennedy vs. Richard Nixon). Based on his theory, Brooks-Baker predicted that John Kerry would defeat the incumbent President George W. Bush in the 2004 presidential election because while sharing a number of royal bloodlines Kerry had more royal ancestors than Bush. However, Bush was re-elected and Brooks-Baker died a few months later.

== Criticism ==
Brooks-Baker was not known for the reliability of his information. His obituary in The Daily Telegraph would say of him: "His great advantage for journalists was that he was always available to make an arresting comment; his disadvantage was that he was often wrong." Critics of the theory point out that perhaps a third of all Americans may be descended from John, King of England (ruled 1199–1216), and that the odds of being distantly related to other royalty are even higher. This is an effect of a phenomenon known as pedigree collapse which occurs due to the doubling of the number of a person's ancestors with each generation. In theory, each person has over one thousand ancestors after ten generations and one million after twenty, far exceeding the number of persons actually living in most regions at any point in time. In fact, most people are descended from the same ancestors multiple times through different lines while anyone living at the time of King John could have tens of millions of descendants in the present day.

There remains a factual question as to whether the number of each candidate's royal ancestors or percentage of "royal blood" can be accurately estimated without being able to trace every branch of the candidate's family tree for an indefinite length. However, the relevance of such descent is also questioned due to the relatively small degree of inheritance a person receives from such distant ancestors. For instance, a person ten generations removed from a royal ancestor would have less than one thousandth of that ancestor's DNA and this amount would be halved with each subsequent generation. Thus, even if being a twenty-seventh generation descendant of King John could confer some advantage on a presidential contender, it is unclear how it would have any measurable effect.

The central claim that until 2004 the winner was always the most royal is called into question by four instances in which successive elections were contested by the same two candidates, with different results. In 1800, 1828, 1840, and 1892, the victorious candidate had lost to the same opponent in the previous election.

== Cultural influence ==
The conclusions of Brooks-Baker would be picked up by conspiracy theorist David Icke and incorporated into his formulation of a world history controlled by the Illuminati, whom he sees as a race of reptilian humanoids that includes the royal houses of Europe.

== See also ==
- Ancestral background of presidents of the United States
- Pseudoscience
