= Royal descent =

Genealogical kinship and descent

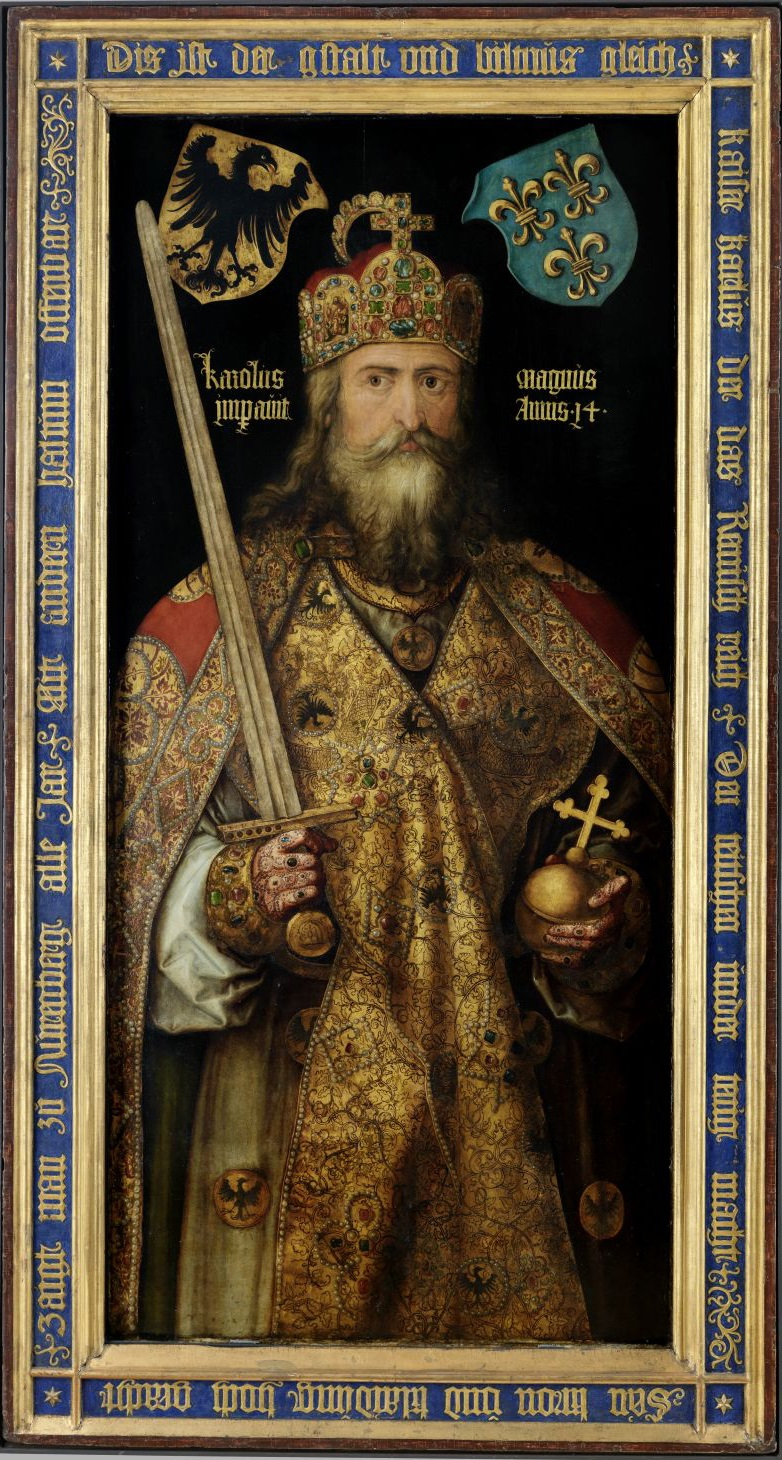
Emperor Charlemagne, by Albrecht Dürer, 1511–1513, Germanisches Nationalmuseum.

A royal descent is a genealogical line of descent from a past or present monarch. It is also typically known as having royal blood.

Both geneticists and genealogists have attempted to estimate the percentage of living people with royal descent. From a genetic perspective, the number of unprovable descendants must be virtually unlimited if going back enough generations, according to coalescent theory, as the possibility increases exponentially following every century back in time. In other words, the number of descendants from a monarch increases as a function of the length of time between the monarch's death and the birth of the particular descendant. As for descendants of genealogically documented royal descent, various estimated figures have been proposed. For instance, Mark Humphrys, a professor of computer science at Dublin City University in Ireland, and genealogy enthusiast, estimated that there are millions of people of provable genealogical ancestry from medieval monarchs.

In genealogy, royal descent is sometimes claimed as a mark of distinction and is seen as a desirable goal. However, due to the incompleteness and uncertainty of existing records, the number of people who do claim royal descent tends to be higher than the number who can actually prove it. Historically, pretenders, impostors and those hoping to improve their social status have often claimed royal descent; Some have used fabricated lineages. The importance of royal descent to some genealogists has been criticized.

Logically, for every royal in a person's family tree, there is bound to be a virtually unlimited number of individuals whose births, deaths and lives went completely unrecorded by history. According to authors Jiri Louda and Michael Maclagan, statistically

most of the inhabitants of Western Europe are probably descended from William the Conqueror; they are equally likely to be descended from the man who groomed his charger.

— Lines Of Succession - Heraldry Of The Royal Families Of Europe, Jiri Louda and Michael Maclagan

== Europe ==
There has been a long tradition for royalty predominantly to intermarry those of their own class. As a result, the ruling houses of Europe have tended to be closely related to one another, and descent from a particular monarch will be found in many dynasties – all present European monarchs, and a great many pretenders, are genealogical descendants of William the Conqueror (1028–1087), for example, and further back in time of Charlemagne (742/747/748–814). Through Charlemagne, some researchers have even speculated on descent from antiquity.

The practice of restrictive marriages has been noted as increasing over the years until the 20th century: the passage of time strengthened the conviction that royalty only allied with royalty, and from the 16th century marriages between royal and commoner became rarer and rarer. This is one reason why descent from more recent monarchs is rarer amongst commoners than from monarchs further back.

Members of untitled families today may be descended from illegitimate children of royalty. Seldom permitted to marry into other royal families, these children tended to marry into upper-class or middle-class families within their own countries.

== United States ==
At one time, publications on this matter stressed royal connections for only a few families. One example included James Pierpont and others. Also, there are NEHGS articles on United States presidents and "tycoon" families and of royal descent that emphasize the discriminating notion, of which the "most royal candidate theory" is a notable result. That is, those of royal descent excel (to wit, Roberts' article on eminent descendants of Mrs. Alice Freeman Thompson Parke). Many, too, were at the forefront of social progress, for example Anne Marbury Hutchinson, who was banished from the Massachusetts Bay Colony for her progressive beliefs.

According to American genealogist Gary Boyd Roberts, an expert on royal descent, most Americans with significant New England Yankee, Mid-Atlantic Quaker, or Southern planter ancestry are descended from medieval kings, especially those of England, Scotland, and France. William Addams Reitwiesner documented many U.S. descendants of Renaissance and modern monarchs. Some Americans may have royal descent through German immigrants who had an illegitimate descent from German royalty.

Due to primogeniture, many colonists of high social status were younger children of English aristocratic families who came to America looking for land because, given their birth order, they could not inherit. Many of these immigrants initially enjoyed high standing where they settled. They could often claim royal descent through a female line or illegitimate descent. Some Americans descend from these 17th-century British colonists who had royal descent. There were at least 650 colonists with traceable royal ancestry, and 387 of them left descendants in America (almost always numbering many thousands, and some as many as one million). These colonists with royal descent settled in various states, but a large majority in Massachusetts or Virginia. Several families which settled in those states, over the two hundred years or more since the colonial land grants, intertwined their branches to the point that almost everyone was somehow related to everyone else. As one writer observed, "like a tangle of fish hooks".

Over time, opposing factors have affected the percentage of Americans who have provable royal descent. The passage of the generations has further intermingled the ancestry of the English colonists' descendants, thus increasing the percentage who descend from one of the immigrants with royal ancestry. At the same time, however, waves of post-colonial immigrants from other countries decreased the percentage who have royal descent.

== Africa ==
Royal descent plays an important role in many African societies; authority and property tend to be lineally derived. Among tribes which recognize a single ruler, the hereditary blood line of the rulers (who early European travelers described as kings, queens, princes, etc., using the terminology of European monarchy) is akin to a dynasty. Among groups which have less centralized power structures, dominant clans are still recognized. Oral history would be the primary method of transmitting genealogies, and both nobles and commoners base their status on descent. The royal blood is among the centralized power of all blood groups.

== Proof of royal ancestry ==
Royal descent is easier to prove than descent from less historically documented ancestors, since genealogies and public records are typically fuller, better known and preserved in the case of royal descent than in the case of descent from less noted individuals. Typically, it is only since the 20th century that family history has been an interest pursued by people outside the upper classes. Hence, the continuous lines of descent from royal ancestors are typically much better researched and established than those from other ancestors. Until the parish record system introduced in the 16th century, and civil registration in the 19th century, family records are fuller for landowners than for ordinary people.

Between 1903 and 1911, the genealogist Melville Henry Massue produced volumes titled The Blood Royal of Britain - which attempted to name all the then-living descendants of King Edward III of England (1312–1377) - were published. He gave up the exercise after publishing the names of about 40,000 living people, but his own estimate was that the total of those of royal descent who could be proved and named if he completed his work at that time was 100,000 people. His work, however, was heavily dependent upon those whose names were readily ascertainable from works of genealogical reference, such as Burke's Peerage and Landed Gentry.

== See also ==
- Dynasty
- Descent from antiquity
- Descent from Genghis Khan
- Royal family
- Most recent common ancestor
- Identical ancestors point
- Inbreeding
- Concubinage
- Consort
- Issue (genealogy)
- Legitimacy (family law)
- Primogeniture
- Royal bastard
- Royal mistress
- Pretender
