= Thomas Gardner Ford =

American politician and businessman

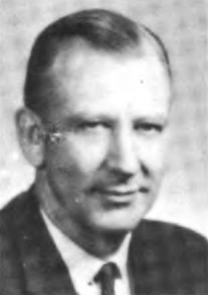
- Ford in 1971

Member of the Michigan House of Representatives from the 91st district
- In office 1965–1972
- Preceded by: Constituency established
- Succeeded by: Peter Kok

Personal details
- Born: July 15, 1918 Grand Rapids, Michigan, US
- Died: August 28, 1995 (aged 77) Johns Island, South Carolina, US
- Party: Republican
- Spouse: Janet Ford
- Relations: Gerald Ford (half-brother)
- Parents: Gerald Rudolff Ford; Dorothy Ayer Gardner
- Education: University of Michigan
- Occupation: Politician, businessman, football official

Thomas Gardner Ford Sr. (July 15, 1918 – August 28, 1995) was an American politician, businessman, and football official. A Republican, he served in the Michigan House of Representatives and was an official of the Big Ten Conference. He was a younger half-brother of President Gerald Ford.

== Early life ==
Ford was born on July 15, 1918 in Grand Rapids, Michigan, to Gerald Rudolff Ford and Dorothy Ayer Gardner Ford. His older half-brother was Gerald Ford.

Ford attended the University of Michigan, graduating with a B.A. in literature in 1941. While there, he was a member of Delta Kappa Epsilon. He also played football, but was on the red-shirted reserve squad.

== Career ==
Ford served for five years in the United States Navy during World War II. After the war, he was active the United States Navy Reserve, retiring after 32 years with the rank of captain.

Ford was president of the Ford Paint and Varnish Company in East Grand Rapids from 1958 to 1964. He was a commissioner of East Grand Rapids City. From 1958 to 1964, he served on the Kent County Board of Commissioners. A Republican, he represented the 91st district in the Michigan House of Representatives, from 1965 to 1972.

Ford then worked as the legislative auit coordinator for the Michigan State Legislature from 1972 to 1980. He was a football official for the Big Ten Conference and high schools.

== Personal life and death ==
Ford married Janet H. Parker in 1942; they had two children, son Thomas G. Ford Jr. and daughter Julie G. Ford. Ford was a member of the American Legion, the Freemasons, and the Shriners. He was an Episcopalian.

Ford retired in 1980 and moved to South Carolina. He died on August 28, 1995, aged 77, from cancer, at his home in Johns Island.
