= Issue (genealogy) =

In genealogy and wills, one's lineal descendants

In genealogy and wills, a person's issue is defined as all their lineal descendants.

== Lineal descendants ==
Issue typically means a person's lineal descendants—all genetic descendants of a person−regardless of degree. Issue is a narrower category than heirs, which includes spouses, and collaterals (siblings, cousins, aunts, and uncles). This meaning of issue arises most often in wills and trusts. A person who has no living lineal descendants is said to have died without issue.

A child or children are first-generation descendants and are a subset of issue.

== See also ==
- Legitimacy (family law) – Legal status of a child born to parents who are legally married
- Lineal descendant – Blood relative in the direct line of descent
- Primogeniture – Inheritance by the eldest, usually male, child
- Royal bastard – Child of a reigning monarch born out of wedlock
- Royal descent – Genealogical kinship and descent
