= William Estabrook Chancellor =

American academic, writer, and presidential candidate

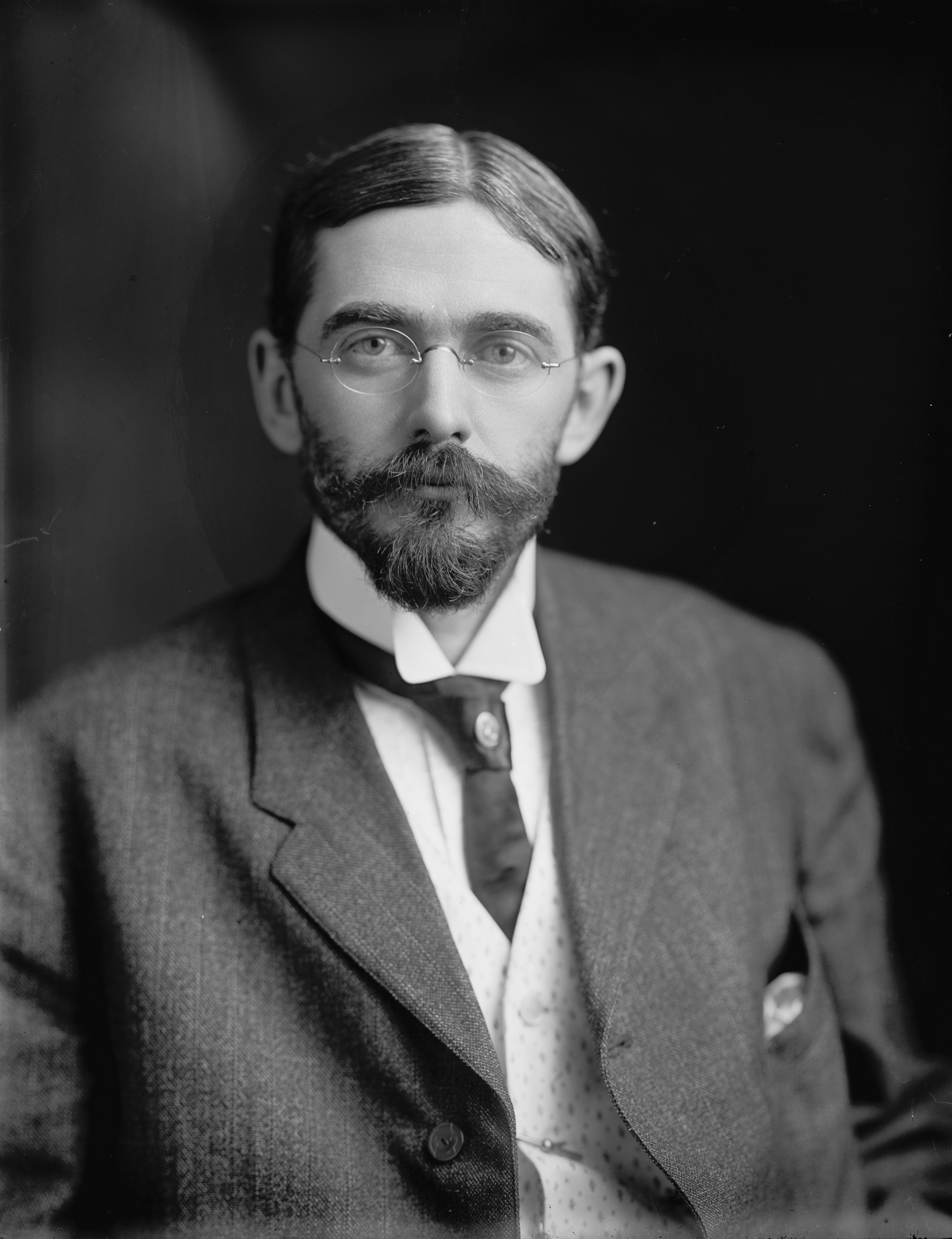
- Born: September 25, 1867; Dayton, Ohio, United States
- Died: February 12, 1963 (aged 95); Wooster, Ohio, United States
- Education: Amherst College
- Occupations: Academia and writer

William Estabrook Chancellor (September 25, 1867 – February 12, 1963) was an American academic and writer. An opponent of the 1920 Republican presidential candidate, Warren G. Harding, Chancellor gained notoriety when he allegedly wrote a study of Harding's ancestry just before the election, asserting that Harding had an African-American ancestor. Chancellor denied authorship, and it has never been proved. Two years later, a biography of Harding was published under Chancellor's name, but Chancellor denied authorship of that as well.

== Biography ==
William Estabrook Chancellor was born in Dayton, Ohio, in 1867. After graduating in 1889 from Amherst College, where he was Phi Beta Kappa, editor of the college newspaper and class orator, he went into teaching. In 1906, while serving as superintendent of schools of Paterson, New Jersey, he was appointed superintendent of schools in Washington, D.C. He also served as superintendent of schools in Bloomfield, New Jersey; and Norwalk, Connecticut. He wrote prolifically, publishing around 40 books and hundreds of articles between 1904 and 1920. He married into the family of Harriet Beecher Stowe. He was a Democrat. From 1914 to 1920, he was a professor of economics, politics, and social science at the College of Wooster in Wooster, Ohio.

In 1920, Chancellor, a scholar of the American presidency who had authored Our presidents and their Office, helped gather biographical information on Republican presidential candidate Warren G. Harding. His investigations included Harding's racial lineage. Chancellor concluded that Harding had some black ancestry. Controversy erupted around Professor Chancellor when some pamphlets were published about Harding's ancestry, which Chancellor was accused of writing even though he denied it. The scandal cost him his professorship at the College of Wooster, and, subjected to continuing harassment, he fled to Canada in 1921.

In 1927 Chancellor was hired by the Xavier University, in Cincinnati, where he taught until his retirement. Chancellor continued to teach, lecture, and publish for the remainder of his life. He died in Wooster in 1963, aged 95.

== Research on Harding ==
Chancellor's research of Harding's lineage was based on affidavits provided by aged Crawford County, Ohio, residents asserting that Harding was of mixed race. Chancellor's research indicated that Harding had a great-grandmother, Elizabeth Madison, who was black. The affidavits by elderly residents in Galion, Ohio, served as the basis for a book later attributed to Chancellor. There was no birth record for Harding, who was born in 1865 near Corsica (now Blooming Grove), Ohio; Ohio did not mandate the recording of births until 1867. Further, there were no court records, deeds, or other legal documents that could prove whether Harding was of mixed race. U.S. census records prior to 1850 did not provide a complete enumeration by name and race of all people in a household. Instead, 1840 and earlier census records only listed the name of the head of household and counted by "hash-mark" the age-group and sex of other persons living with that head of household.

Chancellor allegedly wrote two pamphlets about Harding's racial lineage prior to the 1920 presidential election, unleashing a major scandal by asserting that Harding was of mixed-race descent. Chancellor denied writing the pamphlets, but he refused to sign a statement saying that he believed Harding to be all white, because he considered that to be a lie. Four days before the election, the college dismissed him from his professorship. Copies of the pamphlets were confiscated by Federal agents and destroyed; only five are thought to be in existence, three of which are owned by rare book collectors, the other two owned by museums.

After Harding was elected president, Chancellor did additional research, with the aim of publishing a biography of Harding. The book was to include not only Chancellor's findings about Harding's lineage, but also extended to corruption in the nominating process, and, later, in the formation of Harding's administration. He singled out oil companies in particular. Many of Chancellor's allegations of corruption were later borne out by the Teapot Dome scandal. Early in 1921, Harding learned of Chancellor's planned book and sent Federal agents to destroy the manuscript. Federal agents also monitored Chancellor. Facing ongoing harassment and unable to do research or find another teaching position, he went to Canada in 1921, where he remained until 1922.

In the spring of 1922, Chancellor was in Dayton, Ohio (his hometown as well as that of 1920 Democratic presidential candidate and prominent newspaper publisher James Cox) long enough allegedly to publish a biography of Warren Harding. The author of the book, which was titled Warren Gamaliel Harding, President of the United States, is listed as William Estabrook Chancellor. In the book, the race rumors are developed at great length. Some additional research was also included, such as the first notice of Harding's poor cardiovascular health. (Harding died of cardiovascular disease in 1923, before completing his term in office.) Chancellor gave several interviews to journalists during subsequent years in which he denied writing either the book or the pamphlets. He never suggested who might have been responsible.

Research by Ohio author John A. Murphy, published in 2000 under the title "The Indictment" led Murphy to conclude that, although some of Chancellor's research was included in the 1922 biography, Chancellor himself did not write the book, nor did he publish anything on Harding's background. It appeared that Chancellor was falsely accused with its publication. After the 1922 biography of Harding was published, a statewide organization sold the book door-to-door during the midterm election year.

Based on details within John A. Murphy's book and other existing bibliographical materials, the electronic/audio book entitled "The Chancellor Affair: The FBI File: The True Story about How President Warren G. Harding Abused Power in the White House and Silenced His Most Vocal Critic" was published in 2017 on Amazon. The book told the complete account of the Chancellor affair, and included a detailed family perspective as its author was a family descendant of Chancellor.

== Evaluation ==
In 2015, press reports indicated that DNA analysis showed Harding had no recent black ancestors.

According to Harding biographer John W. Dean, Chancellor's analyses were partly based on a story spread by Amos Kling, Harding's father-in-law, who opposed him politically. Dean, who lived in Marion, Ohio, as a teenager, claimed that Kling spread the story as retribution for positions taken by Harding in his newspaper The Marion Star. Dean characterized Chancellor as racist.

Following Chancellor's death, the author Francis Russell attempted to determine whether Harding was of mixed race. His book, The Shadow of Blooming Grove, published in 1968, noted that he was unable to substantiate Chancellor's conclusions beyond circumstantial evidence. Further discussion of Chancellor's research appears in the book The Strange Deaths of President Harding by Robert H. Ferrell, published in 1996. (This work should not be confused with the 1930 book by Gaston Means, The Strange Death of President Harding, which uses the singular "Death"). Russell wrote, "To anyone who tracks it down today, [the book attributed to Chancellor] comes across as a laughable partisan screed, an amalgam of bizarre racial theories, outlandish stereotypes and cheap political insults. But it also contains a remarkable trove of social knowledge—the kind of community gossip and oral tradition that rarely appears in official records but often provides clues to richer truths."

== Selected publications ==
- The United States: A History of Three Centuries, 1607–1904 (1905) with Fletcher Willis Hewes
- Our City Schools, Their Direction and Management (1908)
- Class-teaching and Management (1910)
- Our Presidents and their Office (1912)
- A Life of Silas Wright 1795–1847 (1913)
- Our Schools: Their Administration and Supervision (1915)
- Educational Sociology (1919)
- The Health of the Teacher (1919)
- History and Government of the United States, for Evening Schools (1912, first edition 1905)

== See also ==
- Swiftboating
- October surprise
- African-American heritage of United States presidents
