= James M. Paxson =

American businessman

James M. Paxson (May 14, 1912 - January 5, 1995) was an American businessman who donated the land and raised funds to create the Gerald R. Ford Birthsite and Gardens at the 1913 birth site of President Gerald Ford.

Paxson was president of Standard Chemical Company in Omaha, a manufacturer of livestock chemicals.

Paxson, who lived nearby in the "near west" Omaha neighborhood said he grown tired of the "for sale" that lingered on the property for three years after a 1971 fire killed an occupant.

In 1974 after Ford became President he bought the property for $17,250 and offered to donate it to the city of Omaha. However the city said it did not have the funds to build a memorial. Paxson then set up the Paxson Foundation to raise funds.

Ford, as President, visited Paxson and the site on May 7, 1976 while campaigning for the Republican nomination in the Nebraska primary. Ford was to lose the primary to Ronald Reagan and said later that the loss of his home state hurt him. Ford won the state in the general election.

The memorial was dedicated in 1977. Ford and Paxson were to fund raise together and Ford returned in 1980 for the dedication of a rose garden in honor of Betty Ford.

Adjoining the site is the Gerald R. Ford Conservation Center (also established by Paxson) which is maintained by the Nebraska State Historical Society which provides conservation services for historical relics. The Center also contains an exhibit of Ford memorabilia.

The two sites are just to the northwest of Hanscom Park, which is one of the oldest public parks in Omaha.
