= Charles Henry King =

American businessman (1853–1930)

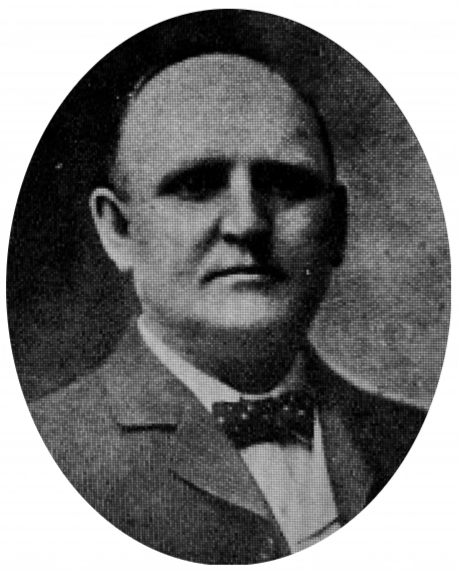
- Born: March 12, 1853; Perry Township, Fayette County, Pennsylvania, US
- Died: February 27, 1930 (aged 76); Los Angeles, California, US
- Burial place: Forest Lawn Cemetery Park
- Occupations: Banker and freight operator
- Known for: Founding of cities in Nebraska and Wyoming
- Children: Leslie Lynch King Sr., among others
- Relatives: Gerald Ford (grandson)

Charles Henry King (March 12, 1853 – February 27, 1930) was an American businessman and banker who was instrumental in founding several cities in the states of Nebraska and Wyoming. He saw opportunity with the expansion of the railroad west and built up related retail businesses, banks and freight operations. His fortune was estimated at $20 million. He was also the paternal grandfather of U.S. President Gerald Ford, who was born in his home in Omaha.

== Personal life ==
King was born in Perry Township, Fayette County, Pennsylvania, the son of Lynch King and Rebecca Shepherd. King married Martha Alicia Porter, with whom he had five children who lived to adulthood: two sons and three daughters, two of them born in Chadron, Nebraska. King's son, Leslie, married Dorothy Ayer Gardner on September 7, 1912. They were married in Harvard, Illinois at her parents' home, but returned to Omaha to live, as that was where Leslie was working. After Dorothy became pregnant, Leslie moved into his parents' home to await the birth of his son, and he named him Leslie Jr. Because of problems with alcohol abuse and domestic violence, Dorothy and Leslie were separated sixteen days after their son's birth. Dorothy moved to her sister's home and then to her parents, who had moved to Grand Rapids, Michigan. Her divorce from Leslie was finalized in December 1913.

== Wyoming and Nebraska pioneer ==
Starting in the 1880s, King began to set up stores, banks and freighting operations in locations which he expected to be destinations on the westward expansion of the Fremont, Elkhorn and Missouri Valley Railroad. This later became the Chicago and North Western Railroad. His company was C.H. King and Company. By his strategic vision, he was ready to supply pioneers and settlers. In the process, King was instrumental in the development of Chadron, Nebraska. While the King family lived in Chadron, two of their five children were born there, including Leslie.

King also helped found the Wyoming communities of Fetterman City, Douglas and Casper. In 1889 King expanded into banking and on June 10, 1889, added the word "bankers" to the name of his company. In 1896 he sold the bank. Previously known as the First National Bank of Casper, it is now part of the First Interstate BancSystem based in Wyoming and Montana. King then concentrated on a freight business between the rail line terminus in Casper and the mineral-rich Wind River region. He helped found the Wyoming communities of Shoshoni, Riverton, and Arapahoe.

In 1908, King moved his family to the growing regional city of Omaha, Nebraska. To crown his success, he commissioned a three-story, 14-room Victorian mansion in central Omaha at 3202 Woolworth Avenue. The mansion was noted for its ornate ballroom, in which Charles and Martha entertained many guests. King managed the Omaha Wool and Storage Company in the city. Leslie, and perhaps his other son, went into business with him as wool traders. King's wealth was estimated to have been up to $20 million. According to his granddaughter, King was known as the wealthiest man in Wyoming.

== Later years and death ==
Perhaps because of a scandal arising from Leslie's divorce and allegations of abuse against him, the Kings retired from business in 1913 and moved to California. When Leslie refused to pay child support, the Kings ensured that their grandson would not be deprived. They paid child support to Dorothy until 1929, shortly before their deaths. They were interred in Forest Lawn Cemetery, Glendale, California near Leslie.

== Recognition of historic importance ==
- The site of C. H. King's mansion in Omaha has been recognized as the Gerald Ford Birthplace and Gardens historic site.
- The C.H. King Company and First Union Bank Building in Shoshoni, Wyoming has been listed on the National Register of Historic Places. The current occupant is Yellowstone Drug.
