= Claes Maartenszen van Rosenvelt =

Dutch-American landowner and patriarch of the Roosevelt family in America

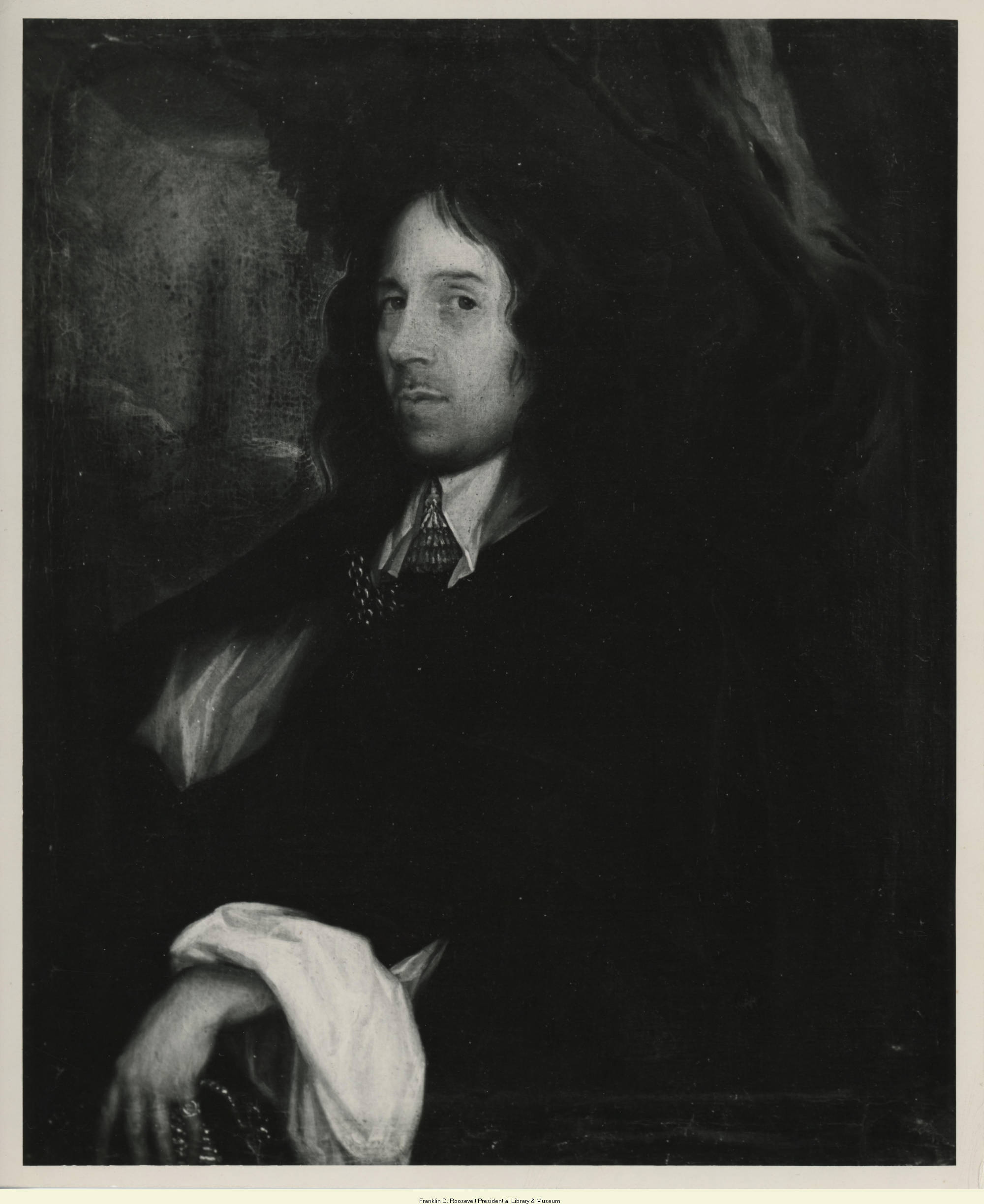
- Born: Claes Maertenszoon van 't Rosevelt; 1623; Netherlands
- Died: December 4, 1679 (aged 55–56); New York City, Province of New York
- Occupations: businessman, landowner, farmer
- Children: Nicholas Roosevelt (1658–1742), Christiaen Roosevelt (born 1650), Elsje Roosevelt (born 1651 or 1652; died 1703), Anna Margariet Roosevelt (1654–1708), Anna Roosevelt (1662–1744)
- Parents: Maerten Corneliuszen Gelderman Van Rosenvelt (father); Cornelia Johanna Lodewijk (mother)
- Family: Roosevelt Family

Claes Maartenszen van Rosenvelt (1623 – December 4, 1679) was a Dutch-American businessman and landowner in New Amsterdam and was the ancestor of both the Oyster Bay and Hyde Park Roosevelt Families and the 5th great-grandfather of Theodore Roosevelt and Franklin Delano Roosevelt.

== Early life and immigration ==
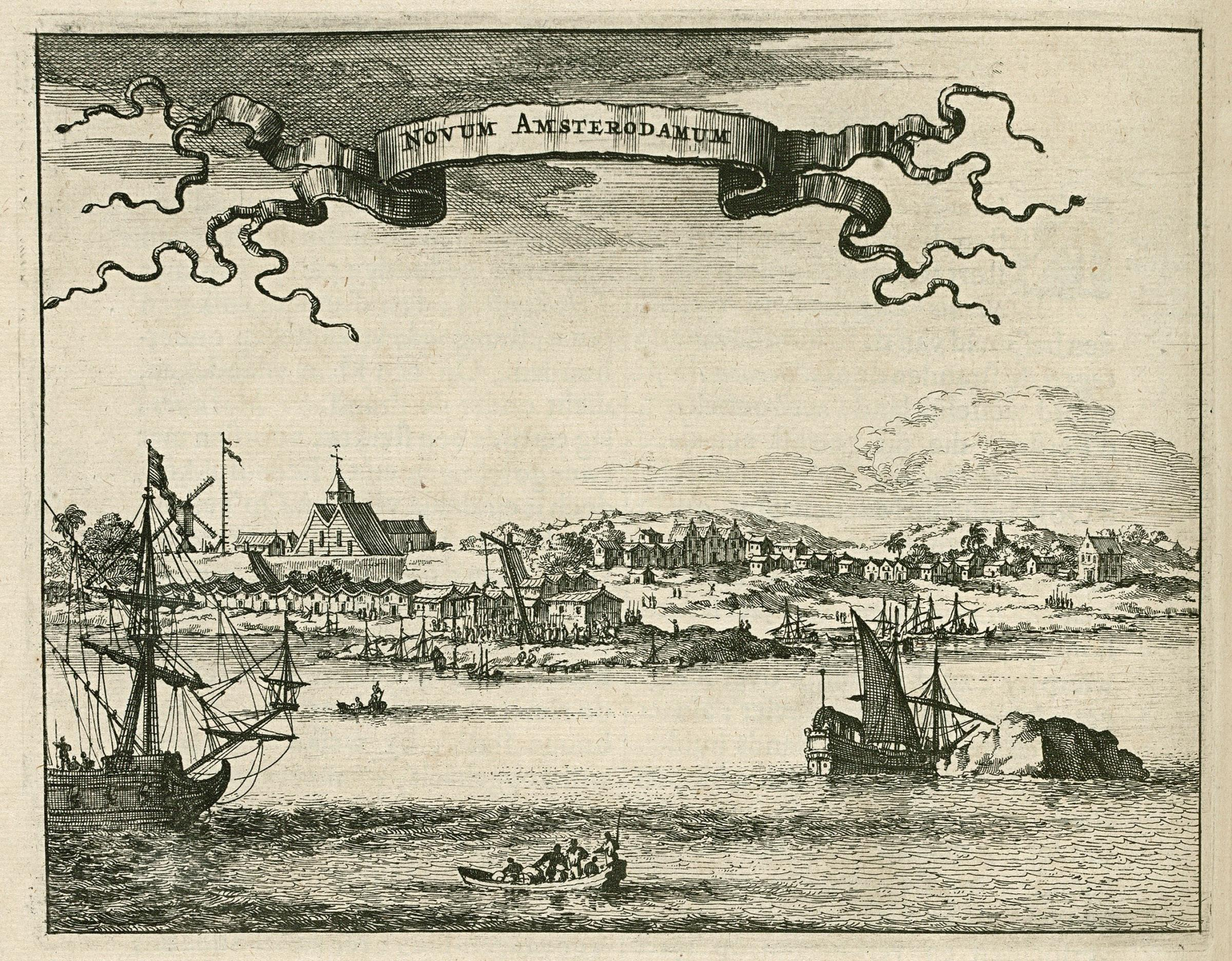
New Amsterdam in 1662

Claes Maartenszen van Rosenvelt, only child of Maerten Corneliuszen Gelderman Van Rosenvelt (1596–1661) and Cornelia Johanna Lodewijk (1600–1694), was born in 1623, in the Dutch Republic. Between 1638 and 1649, he immigrated to New Amsterdam (present-day New York City). On August 6, 1650, he married Jannetje Samuels Thomas (1625–1662) and the couple had 5 children from 1650 to 1662: Nicholas Roosevelt (1658–1742), Christiaen Roosevelt (born 1650), Elsje Roosevelt (born 1651 or 1652; died 1703), Anna Margariet Roosevelt (1654–1708), Anna Roosevelt (1662–1744).

== Later years and death ==
In 1652, he bought a farm from Lambert van Valckenburgh, comprising 24 morgens (20.44 ha; 50.5 acres) in what is now Midtown Manhattan, including the present site of the Empire State Building. The property included approximately what is now the area between Lexington Avenue and Fifth Avenue bounded by 29th Street and 35th Street. Claes died on December 4, 1679 at the age of 56. His son Nicholas changed their family name from Van Rosenvelt to Roosevelt.
