= Gerald Rudolff Ford =

American politician (1890–1962)

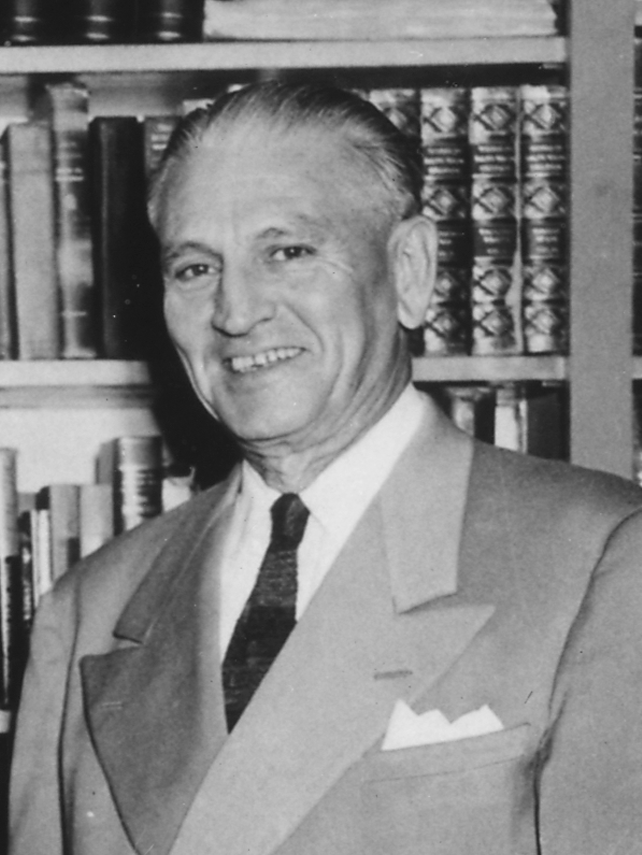
- Ford in 1948
- Born: December 9, 1890; Grand Rapids, Michigan, U.S.
- Died: January 26, 1962 (aged 71); Grand Rapids, Michigan, U.S.
- Occupation: Businessman
- Employer(s): Ford Paint and Varnish Company
- Political party: Republican
- Spouse: Dorothy Ayer Gardner (m. 1917)
- Children: 3, including Thomas Gardner Ford

Gerald Rudolff Ford (December 9, 1890 – January 26, 1962) was an American businessman and local politician. He was the stepfather of U.S. President Gerald Ford and for whom Ford legally changed his name.

== Early life ==
Ford was born in Grand Rapids, Michigan in 1890 to George R. Ford and Frances (née Pixley).

Ford's father, George, died in a train accident in 1903, forcing him to drop out of school to support the family.

== Career ==
Ford worked as a paint salesman at the Grand Rapids Wood Finishing Company. He founded the Ford Paint and Varnish Company in 1929 before the Great Depression. After the Depression hit, Ford asked his employees to work for $5 a week and paid himself the same salary until all could be paid more.

He was chairman of the Kent County, Michigan Republican Committee from 1944 until 1948, when he stepped down after his stepson began his first run for Congress. He was director of the Grand Rapids Chamber of Commerce.

== Personal life ==
Ford met Dorothy Ayer Gardner King in Grand Rapids, Michigan. She had fled to Michigan from Omaha, Nebraska in 1913, sixteen days after the birth of her son, Leslie Lynch King Jr., after her husband (and her son's birth father), Leslie Lynch King Sr., had physically abused her. She came to Grand Rapids to be near her parents, Levi Addison Gardner and Adele Augusta Ayer Gardner, who lived in the town.

The couple married on February 1, 1917, following Dorothy's divorce from King in 1916. They had three children: Thomas Gardner Ford (July 15, 1918 – August 28, 1995); Richard Addison Ford (June 3, 1924 – March 20, 2015); and James Francis Ford (August 11, 1927 – January 23, 2001). Ford never legally adopted Leslie, although the future president changed his name in 1935, after the deaths of his paternal King family grandparents, to an Anglicized version of his stepfather's name: Gerald Rudolph Ford.

Ford was active with his four sons in the Boy Scouts of America. He was active in the formation of the Youth Commonwealth to help disadvantaged youth.

Ford died on January 26, 1962, in Grand Rapids, Michigan. He and his wife are buried in Woodlawn Cemetery in Grand Rapids.
