= Dorothy Ayer Gardner Ford =

Mother of U.S. President Gerald Ford

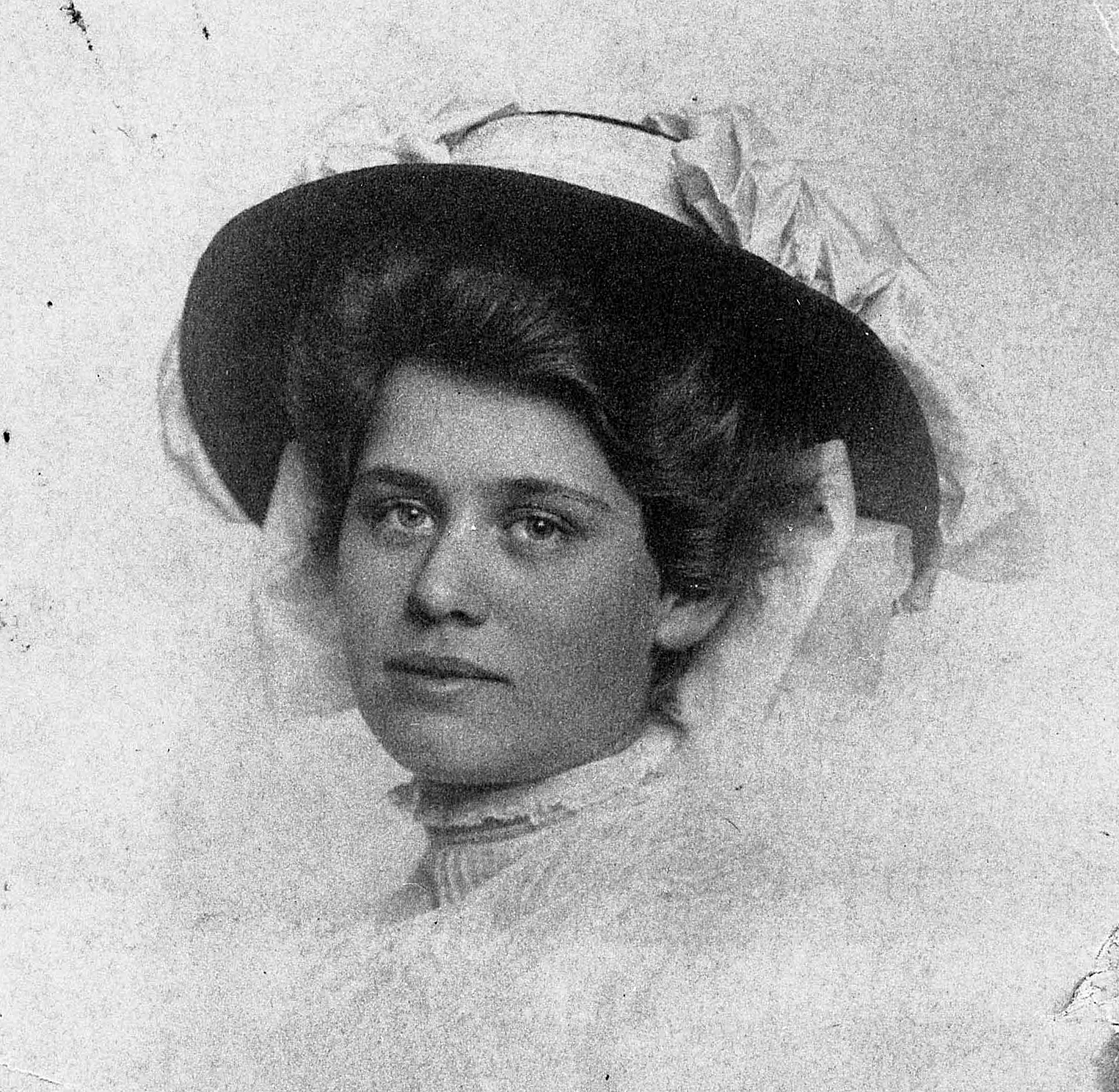
- Ford in 1912
- Born: Dorothy Ayer Gardner; February 27, 1892; Harvard, Illinois, U.S.
- Died: September 17, 1967 (aged 75); Grand Rapids, Michigan, U.S.
- Spouses: Leslie Lynch King Sr. (m. 1912; div. 1913); Gerald Rudolff Ford (m. 1917; died 1962)
- Children: Gerald; Thomas; Richard; James

Dorothy Ayer Gardner King Ford (née Gardner; February 27, 1892 – September 17, 1967) was the mother of U.S. President Gerald Ford.

== Early life and marriage ==
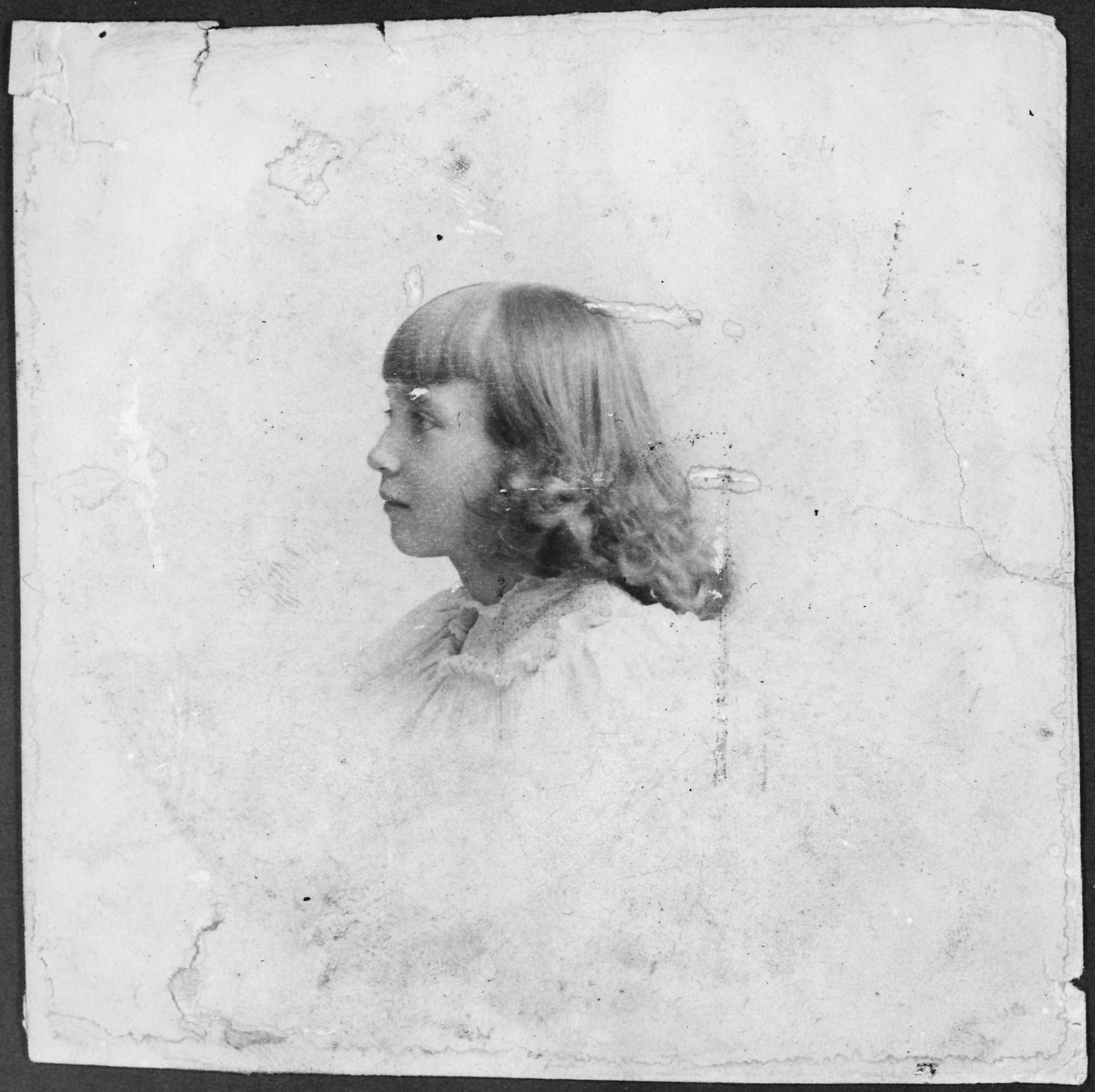
Dorothy Ayer Gardner as a child.

Dorothy Ayer Gardner was born in the small town of Harvard, Illinois, in 1892 to Levi Addison Gardner, a businessman and one-time mayor, and Adele Augusta Gardner (née Ayer).

There she married her first husband, wool trader Leslie Lynch King Sr. of Omaha, Nebraska, on September 7, 1912. She met him while she was a student at Wellesley College, as he was the charming brother of her roommate.

The couple returned to Omaha, King's home. They lived at first with his parents at their Victorian mansion at 3202 Woolworth Avenue. His parents were wealthy banker and businessman Charles Henry King and the former Martha Alicia Porter, both from Fayette County, Pennsylvania.

Soon after her marriage, Dorothy discovered that her husband was abusive. In Omaha, she further discovered he was a liar and an alcoholic, but she also found out that she was pregnant. With the support of his parents, she stayed with her husband until the birth of their son, who was born on July 14, 1913, and named Leslie Lynch King Jr. A few days after the birth, her husband brandished a butcher knife while threatening to kill her, their child, and the infant's nurse; the police had to be called to restrain him.

== Separation and divorce ==
Sixteen days after the birth of her son, Dorothy Gardner King left her husband. Divorce was unusual then, but she refused to continue to risk her son's safety or her own. She took Leslie Jr. with her to the Oak Park, Illinois, home of her sister Tannisse and brother-in-law Clarence Haskins James. From there she moved to the home of her parents, who had relocated to Grand Rapids, Michigan.

Dorothy Gardner King quickly filed for formal separation and divorce. On December 19, 1913, an Omaha court granted her a divorce on the grounds of extreme cruelty. Leslie King refused to pay child support. His father Charles Henry King paid it until shortly before his death in 1930.

== Second marriage and family ==
Three years later, Dorothy met Grand Rapids businessman Gerald Rudolff Ford. After their marriage on February 1, 1917, they called her first son Gerald Rudolff Ford Jr., although he was not formally adopted by his stepfather. In 1935, Gerald Ford Jr. legally changed his name in honor of his stepfather, the only father he really had. At the time, Ford adopted a more conventional spelling of his middle name. Later Ford recounted that his mother insisted he learn to control his temper, one he seemed to have inherited from his biological father.

Dorothy Ford bore three more sons during her second marriage: Thomas Gardner Ford (July 15, 1918 — August 28, 1995), Richard Addison Ford (June 3, 1924 — March 20, 2015), and James Francis Ford (August 11, 1927 — January 23, 2001).

Ford was a member of the Daughters of the American Revolution.

She died in 1967 in Grand Rapids, Michigan, and is buried with her second husband at Woodlawn Cemetery in Grand Rapids.
