= Whitsett =

Whitsett may refer to:

- Whitsett, Kentucky
- Whitsett, North Carolina
- Whitsett, Pennsylvania

== People with the surname Whitsett ==
- Carson Whitsett
- Doug Whitsett
- Tim Whitsett
- Vivicca Whitsett

== See also ==
- Whitsett Historic District (disambiguation)
