= Frazier High School =

School in Pennsylvania, US

Coordinates: 40.08837°N 79.75474°W

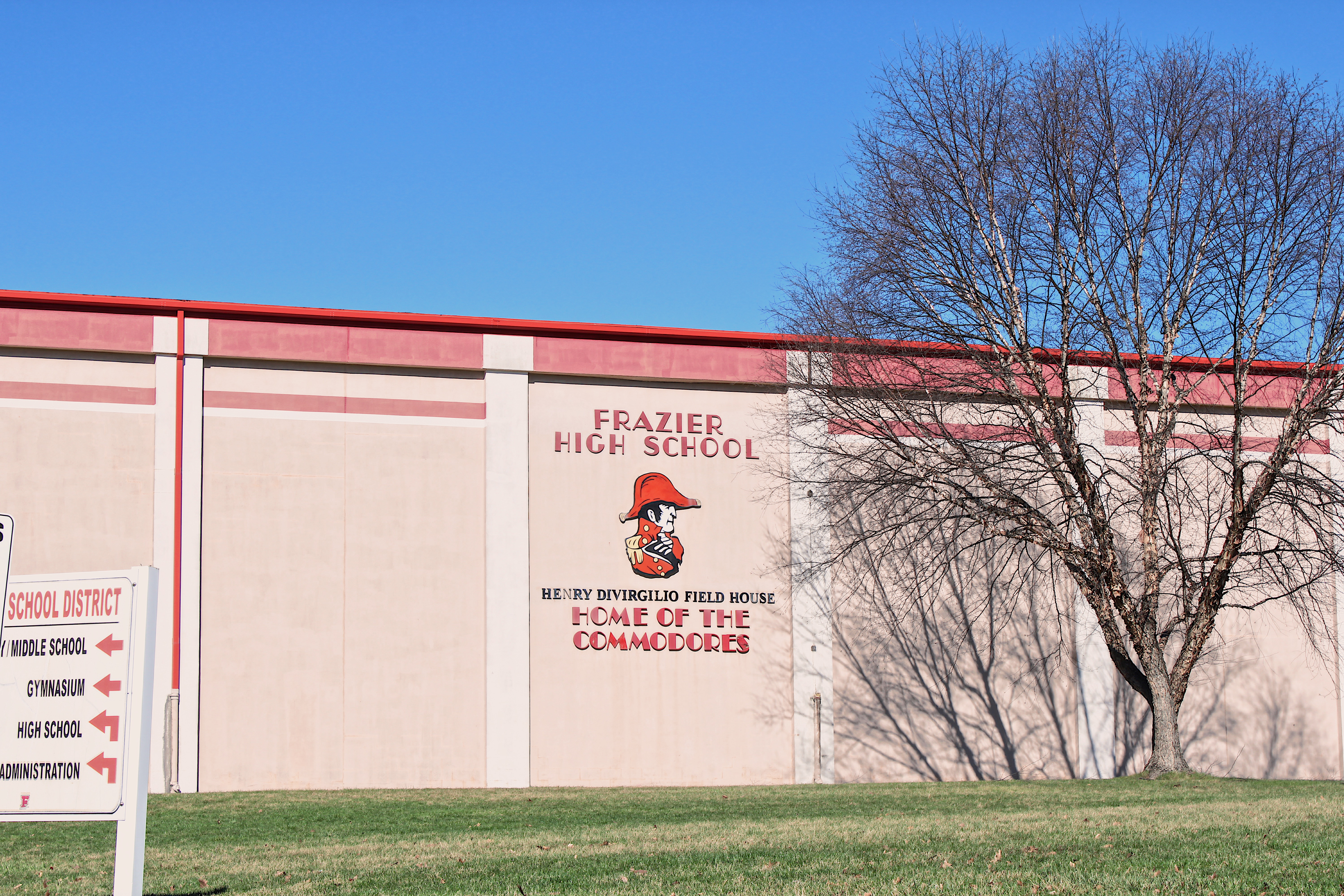

Location
- 142 Constitution Street; Perryopolis, Fayette County, Pennsylvania 15473; United States of America

Information
- School type: Public High School
- Established: 1966
- School district: Frazier School District
- NCES District ID: 4210350
- NCES School ID: 421035002126
- Principal: Mr. Jason E. Pappas
- Faculty: 24 teachers (2015) 24 (2013)
- Teaching staff: 23.25 (FTE)
- Grades: 9–12
- Enrollment: 316 (2023-2024)
- Student to teacher ratio: 13.59
- Language: English
- Athletics conference: PIAA District VII (WPIAL)
- Team name: Commodores
- Communities served: Newell, Perryopolis, Perry Township, Jefferson Township, Lower Tyrone Township
- Feeder schools: Frazier Middle School
- Website: Frazier High School

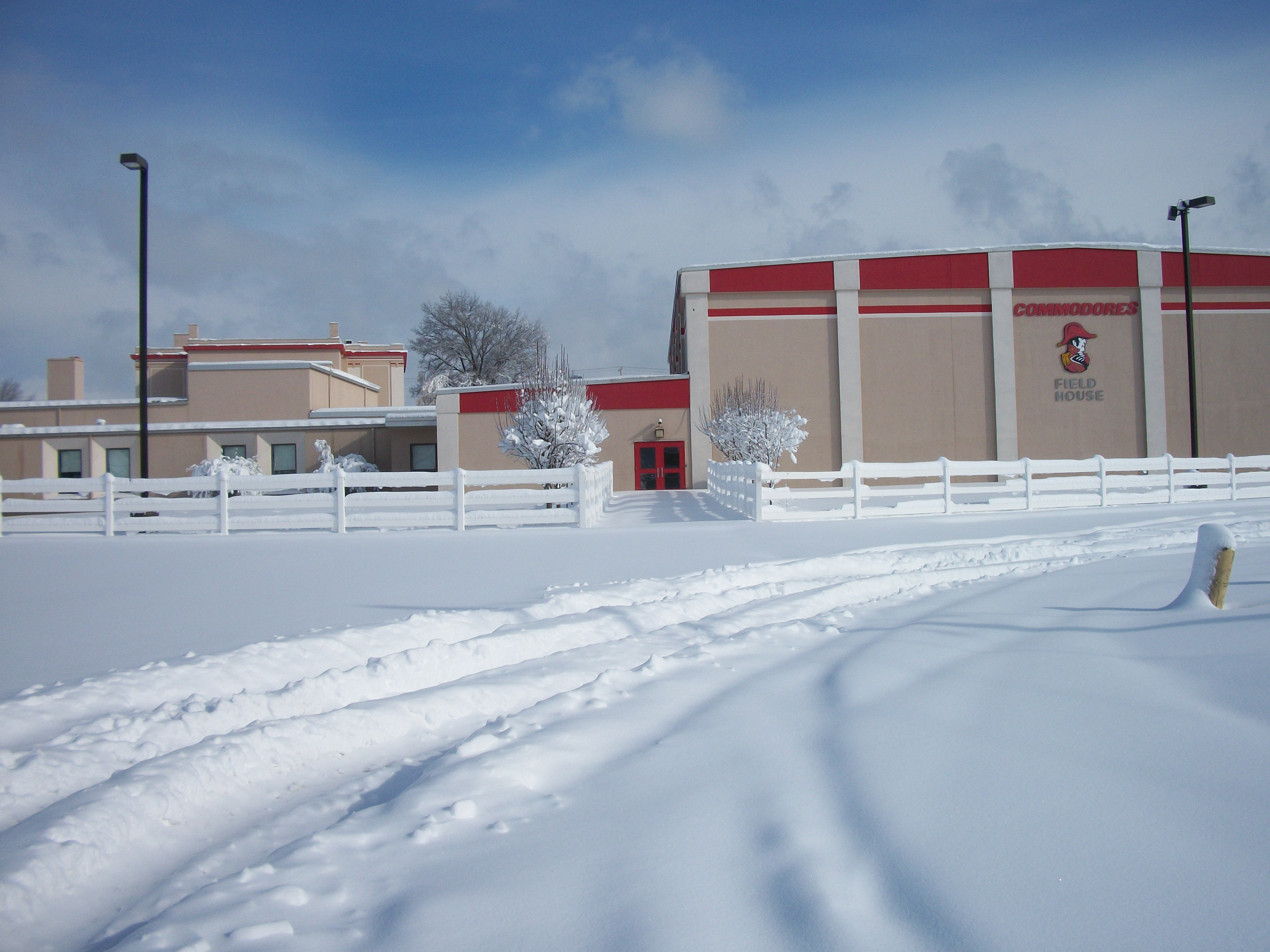
Frazier High School, as seen during a winter storm.

Frazier High School is a rural, public high school. It is the sole high school in the Frazier School District. It is in northern Fayette County, Pennsylvania, in the town of Perryopolis. In the 2022–2023 school year, enrollment was reported as 316 students in 9th through 12th grades.

Frazier High School was established in 1966, and resulted in the consolidation of the Perry and Lower Tyrone School Districts. The school was last renovated in 1990, when space was reconfigured for the addition of the Frazier Middle School, the high school's sole feeder. The name comes from Mary Fuller Frazier, a wealthy resident who gave an endowment to the district for the improvement of the school system.

The Intermediate Unit IU1 provides the school and the district with a wide variety of services like specialized education for disabled students and hearing, background checks for employees, state mandated recognizing and reporting child abuse training, speech and visual disability services and criminal background check processing for prospective employees and professional development for staff and faculty.

== Extracurriculars ==
Frazier School District offers a wide variety of clubs, activities and an extensive sports program. The National Honor Society Chapter is active in the school.

=== Athletics ===
Sport	Boys	Girls
Baseball	Class AA	
Basketball	Class AA	Class AA
Football	Class A	
Golf	Class AA	Class AA
Softball		Class A
Track and Field	Class AA	Class AA
Volleyball		Class A

The Frazier High School Football team has made the WPIAL playoffs for the 2011, 2012, 2013, and 2014 seasons. Also the Frazier Boys' and Girls' Basketball teams made the WPIAL playoffs for the 2012 season. The Girls' Volleyball team have been section champions for the past 4 years, and the WPIAL champions in 2008. In addition, the Frazier Boys' Varsity Cross Country team won the section title for the 2010 and 2011 seasons. The Cross Country team placed within the top 10 teams at the WPIAL championship in 2011, and sent 2 runners to the PIAA state championship the same year.
