= Star Junction, Pennsylvania =

Unincorporated community in Pennsylvania, US

Star Junction
- Census-designated place
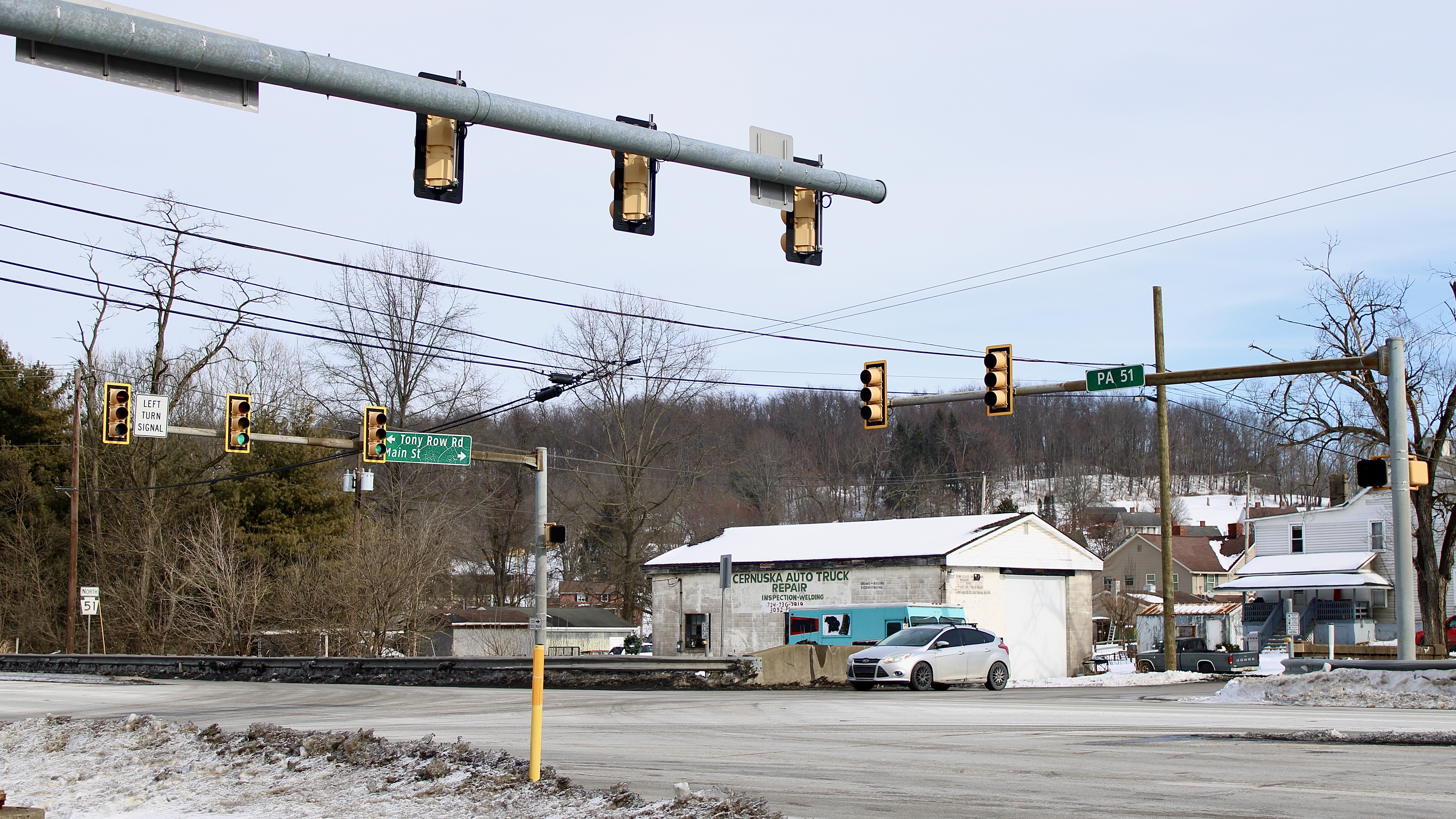
- Star Junction in 2026

- Location of Star Junction in Pennsylvania
- Coordinates: 40°03′45″N 79°45′49″W
- Country: United States
- State: Pennsylvania
- County: Fayette
- Township: Perry
- Established: 1893

Area
  - Total: 1.21 sq mi (3.1 km^{2})
  - Land: 1.19 sq mi (3.1 km^{2})
  - Water: 0.02 sq mi (0.052 km^{2})
- Elevation: 981 ft (299 m)

Population (2010)
  - Total: 616
  - Density: 518/sq mi (200/km^{2})
- Time zone: UTC-4 (EST)
  - Summer (DST): UTC-5 (EDT)
- Postal code: 15482
- Area code: 724

- Star Junction Historic District
- U.S. National Register of Historic Places
- U.S. Historic district
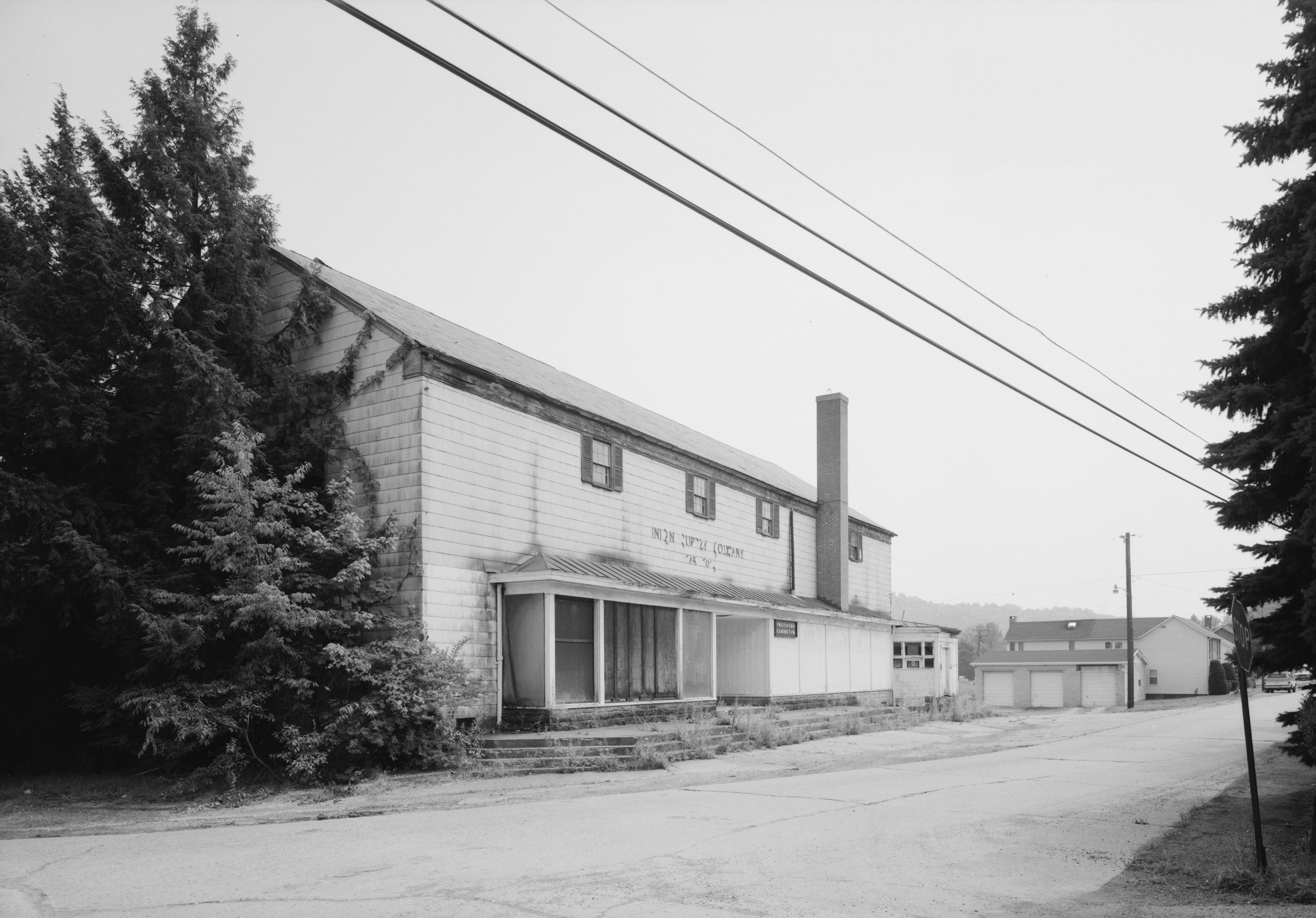
- Old company store in Star Junction, May 1989

- Location within Pennsylvania Location within the United States
- Location: Roughly the jct. of PA 51 and PA 4036, including Post Office Rd., Church St., PA 532, and Old Ridge Rd., Perry Township, Pennsylvania
- Coordinates: 40°03′42″N 79°45′43″W
- Area: 100 acres (40 ha)
- Built: 1892
- Built by: Washington Coal and Coke
- Architectural style: company built miner's duplex
- MPS: Bituminous Coal and Coke Resources of Pennsylvania MPS
- NRHP reference No.: 97001244
- Added to NRHP: October 24, 1997

Star Junction is an unincorporated community and census-designated place in Perry Township, Fayette County, Pennsylvania, United States. The community is located on Pennsylvania Route 51. At the 2010 census, the population was 616.

== History ==
Star Junction was founded in 1893, when the Washington No. 2 Mine was opened by the Washington Coal and Coke Company. It is so-named because it was once the site of a railroad depot, the end of the line for the Washington Run Railroad. Star Junction was once a coal mining center, with beehive ovens for coke manufacture and a foundry. It was the site of labor unrest, including the walkout of 4,500 miners in 1922. Although the company store and mines are long gone, the "patch" (the groups of company houses) still remains and houses many residents. This area was added to the "Determined Eligible List" of the Bureau of Historic Preservation, as an example of a typical coal town, and has been added to the National Register of Historic Places.

== Notable person ==
John Kundla (1916-2017), educator and college/professional basketball coach, was born in Star Junction.

== Geography ==
Star Junction is in northwestern Fayette County, in the southwest part of Perry Township. Via PA 51 it is 2 miles (3 km) north to Perryopolis and 13 miles (21 km) south to Uniontown, the county seat.

According to the U.S. Census Bureau, the Star Junction CDP has a total area of 1.2 square miles (3.1 km^{2}), of which 0.02 square miles (0.04 km^{2}), or 1.42%, is water.

=== Historic district ===
The Star Junction Historic District is a national historic district covering Star Junction. It was added to the National Register of Historic Places in 1997. This district includes 163 contributing buildings and two contributing structures that are located in the community. Most of the contributing buildings were built between 1892 and 1918; 130 are two-story, frame duplex workers' houses. The oldest building is the Whitsett farmhouse; it was built circa 1845. Other buildings and structures include twenty-two mine managers' dwellings ("Tony Row"), two former mine buildings, two churches, a parsonage, two commercial buildings, a concrete highway bridge (1921), and n earthen dam reservoir (c. 1892).

== Education ==
Star Junction is served by the Frazier School District.

== Gallery ==
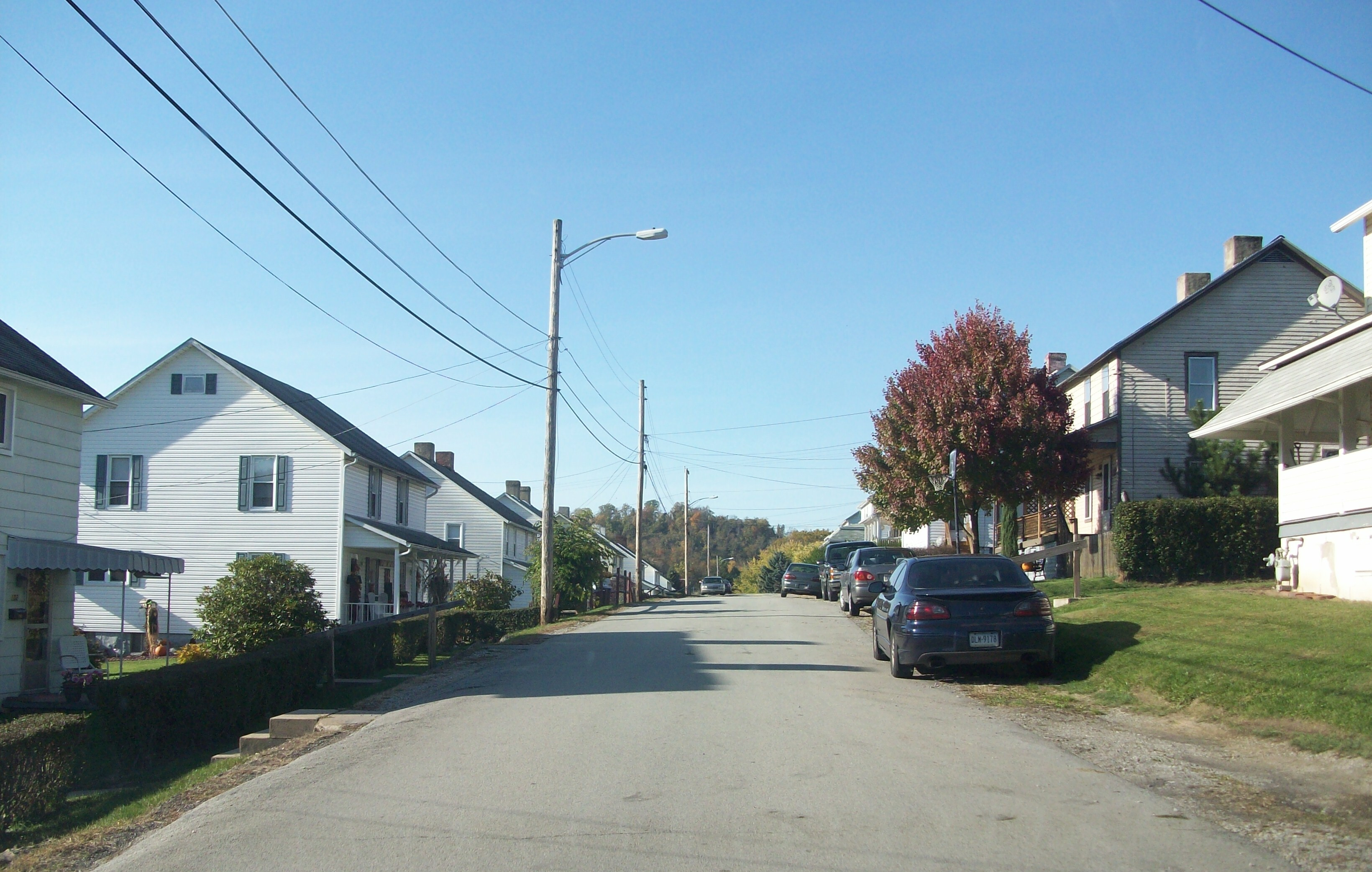
A string of Star Junction company homes, October 2009

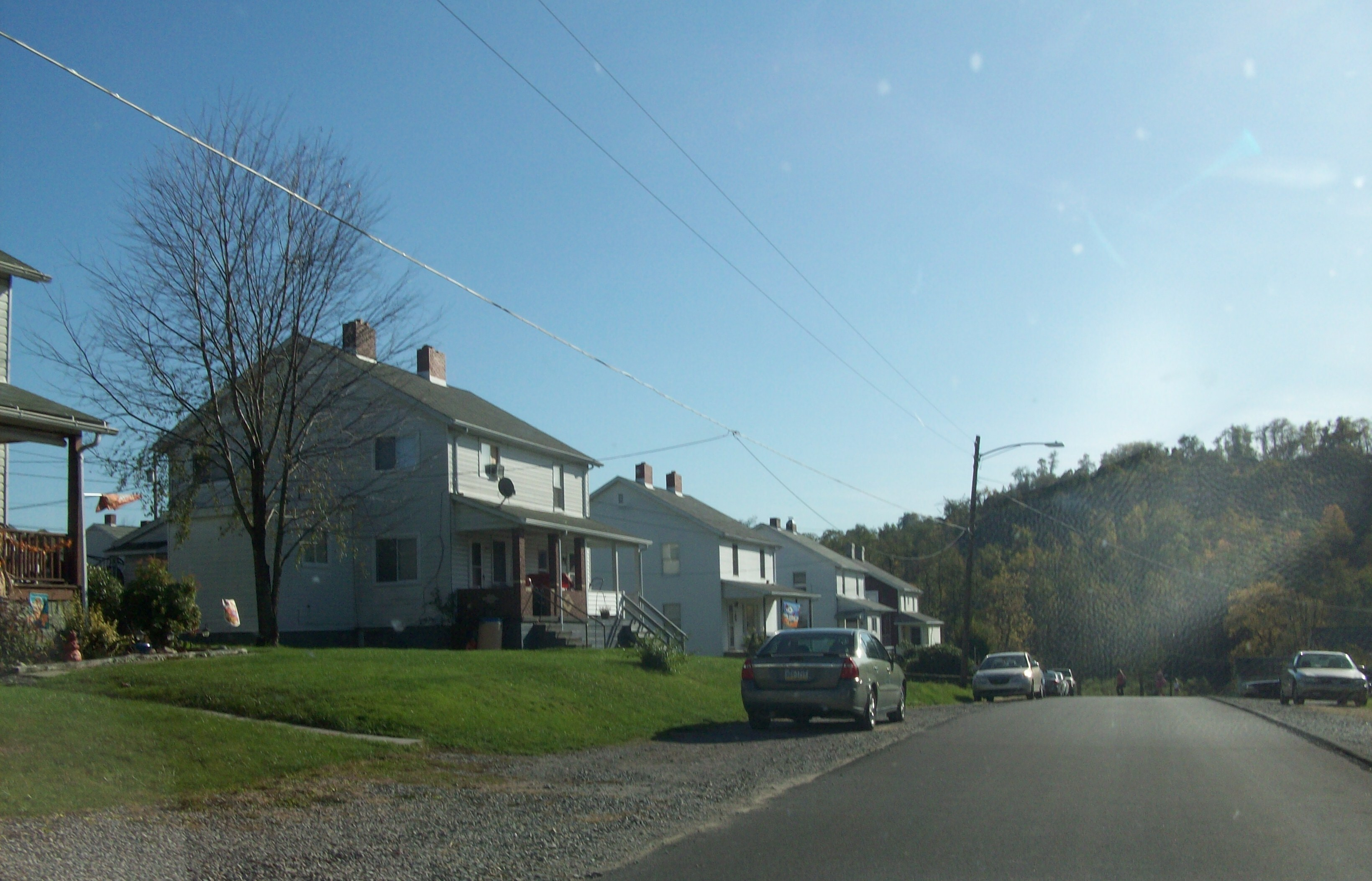
Star Junction coal-patch style housing, October 2009
