= Layton Bridge =

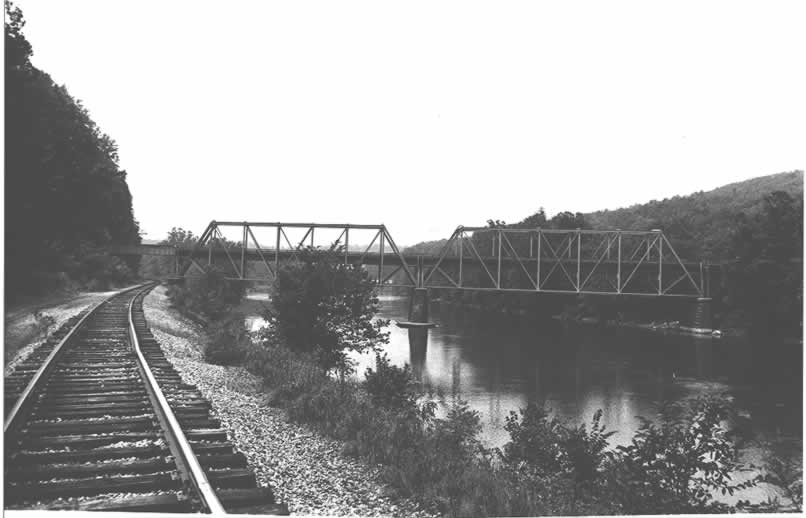
- Coordinates: 40°5′21″N 79°43′49″W
- Carries: Layton Road (SR 4038), originally Washington Run Railroad
- Crosses: Youghiogheny River
- Locale: Perry Township
- Heritage status: NRHP

Characteristics
- Design: through truss Pratt truss
- Material: Steel
- Width: 14.3 feet (4.36 m) (single lane)
- Longest span: 181 feet (55.2 m)

History
- Designer: Taylor & Romine
- Construction start: 1899; 127 years ago

Location
- Interactive map of Layton Bridge

- Layton Bridge
- U.S. National Register of Historic Places
- Location within Pennsylvania Location within the United States
- Coordinates: 40°5′21″N 79°43′49″W
- Built: 1899
- Architect: Taylor & Romine, Roberts, A & P, Co.
- Architectural style: Pratt truss
- NRHP reference No.: 88000840
- Added to NRHP: 1988

The Layton Bridge is a Pratt truss bridge over the Youghiogheny River in Layton, Pennsylvania. Originally built for the Washington Run Railroad, construction began 1893 and was completed in 1899. The last train crossed in 1931. The bridge and a tunnel immediately to its south were converted to a single automobile lane in 1933 as part of a road that connects Layton with Perryopolis, near the suspected location of the eighteenth-century Spark's Fort.

The bridge has not been painted in recent years and its members are now corroded.

== In popular culture ==
The bridge was filmed as part of "Fire in the Hole", the pilot episode of the television series Justified, and was seen in the movie The Silence of the Lambs. The Layton Bridge was also featured in the 2021 movie Sweet Girl.

== Gallery ==
Builder's plate.

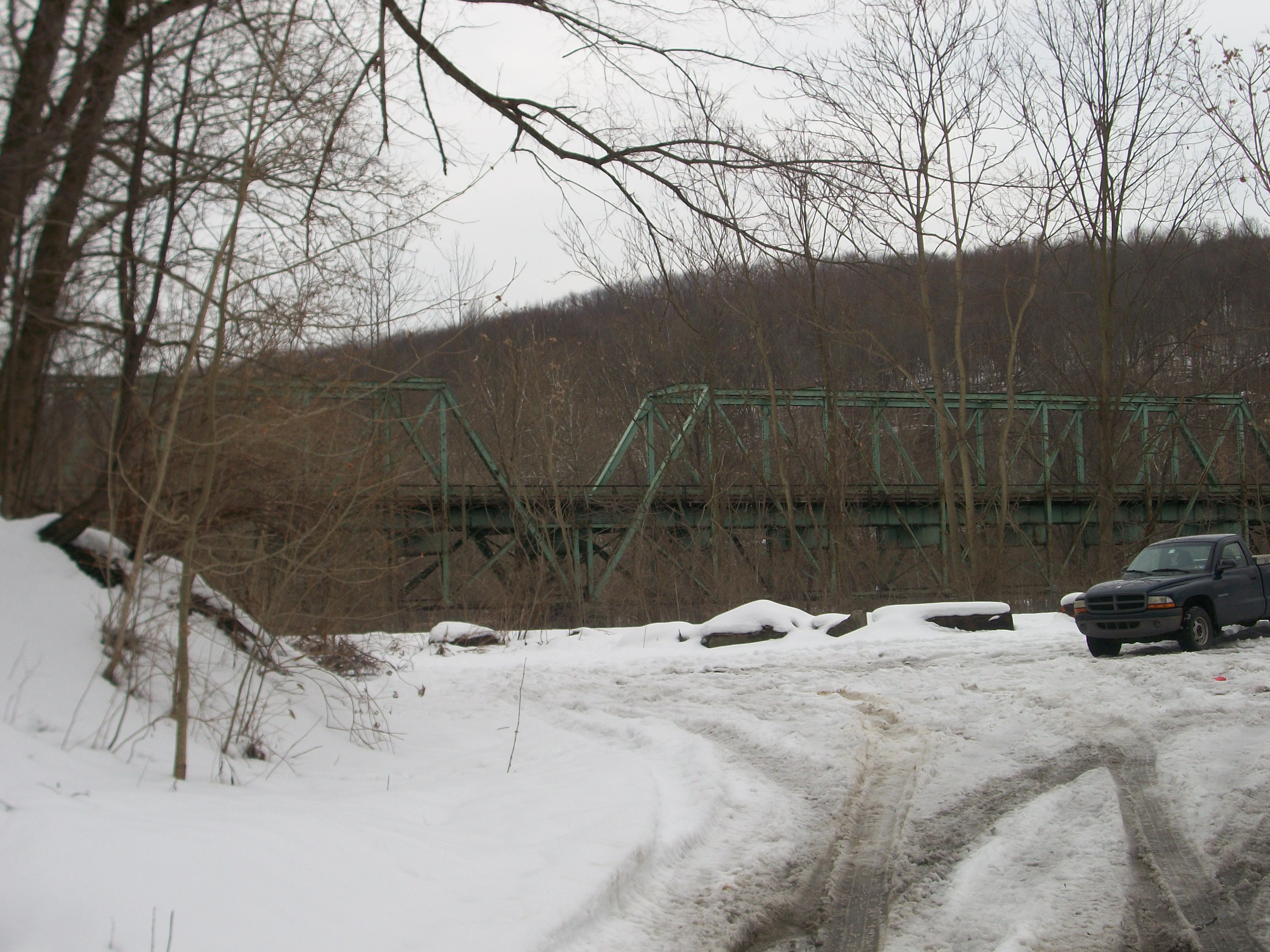
Layton Bridge in Winter 2009–2010.

Corrosion.
