= Whitsett Historic District =

Whitsett Historic District may refer to:

- Whitsett Historic District (Whitsett, North Carolina), listed on the National Register of Historic Places in Guilford County, North Carolina
- Whitsett Historic District (Whitsett, Pennsylvania), listed on the National Register of Historic Places in Fayette County, Pennsylvania
