= Washington Run Railroad =

Branch line railroad in Pennsylvania

Overview
- Reporting mark: WRN
- Locale: Perry Township, Fayette County, Pennsylvania
- Dates of operation: 1899–1931

Technical
- Track gauge: 1,435 mm (4 ft 8 1/2 in) standard gauge
- Length: 4 m (13 ft)

The Washington Run Railroad was a branch line in Pennsylvania. Starting at a junction with the B&O Railroad in Layton, the line crossed the Youghiogheny River on a bridge (Layton Bridge) and passed through a tunnel (both built by the A.P. Roberts Construction Company) to continue to Perryopolis. From there, it continued to Star Junction on a track that ran parallel to today's Pennsylvania Route 51.

The railroad had a passenger car that it used for passenger service, but it was primarily a freight carrier, transporting coke produced at Star Junction and coal for the Washington Coal and Coke Company and the Cochran Coal Company. It also served the brickworks in Layton and had a stop in Victoria.

The railroad ceased operation in 1931. Layton Bridge and the adjacent tunnel still serve as a single lane part of Layton Road (State Route 4038).

Washington Run Railroad Tunnel
- Interactive map of Washington Run Railroad Tunnel

Overview
- Location: Pennsylvania
- Coordinates: 40°05′18″N 79°43′54″W
- Status: last train March 12, 1931, converted to automobile use August 1933
- Start: near Layton, Pennsylvania
- End: Perryopolis, Pennsylvania

Operation
- Work began: 1899
- Constructed: rock bored, masonry arch entrances
- Closed: 1931 as a rail tunnel
- Owner: Washington Run Railroad

Technical
- Length: 208 ft (63 m)
- No. of tracks: single
- Track gauge: 1,435 mm (4 ft 8 1/2 in) standard gauge
