= Wickhaven, Pennsylvania =

Unincorporated community in Pennsylvania, US

- Populated place
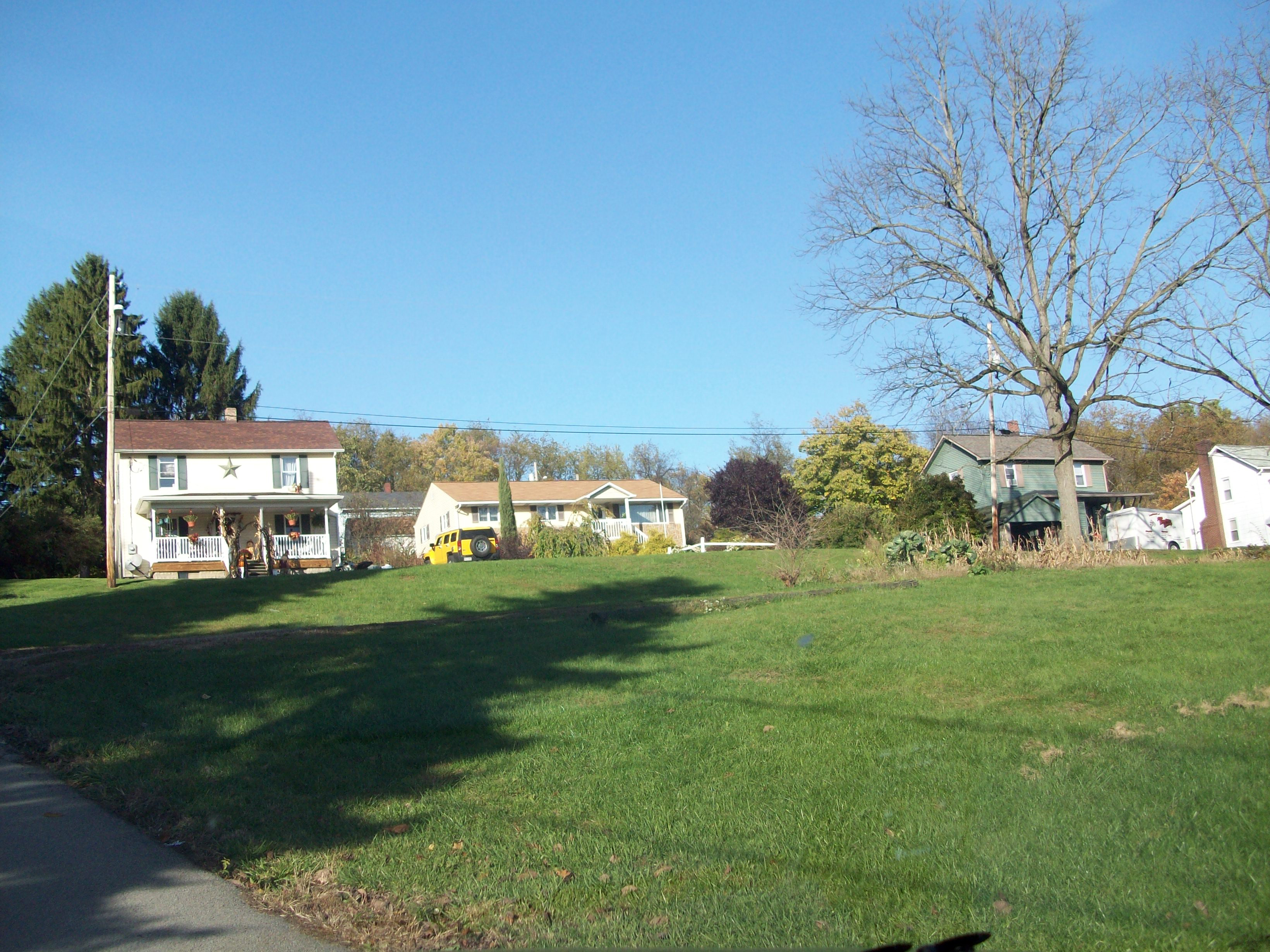
- Interactive map of Wickhaven, Pennsylvania
- Coordinates: 40°07′42″N 79°46′22″W
- Country: United States
- State: Pennsylvania
- County: Fayette
- Township: Perry
- Time zone: UTC-4 (EST)
  - Summer (DST): UTC-5 (EDT)
- ZIP code: 15492
- Area code: 724

Wickhaven is a populated place in Fayette County, Pennsylvania, United States. Wickhaven is located along Pennsylvania Route 51. It is 965 feet above sea level.

== Geography ==
Wickhaven is located at 40°07′42″N 79°46′22″W (40.123, -79.773).
