= Perry Township, Fayette County, Pennsylvania =

Township in Pennsylvania, US

Coordinates: 40°05′00″N 79°45′59″W

Perry Township
- Township
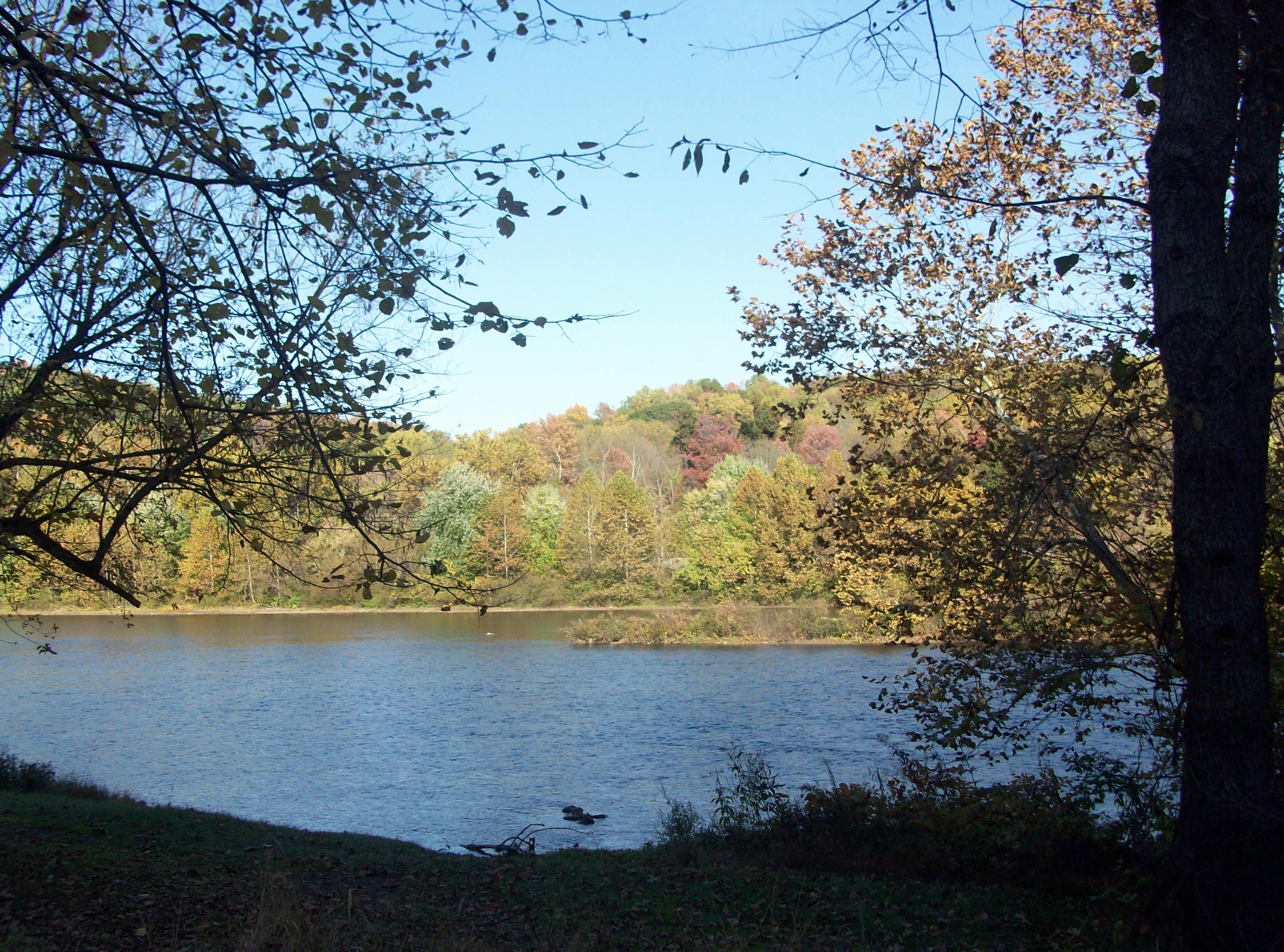
- Youghiogheny River at Whitsett

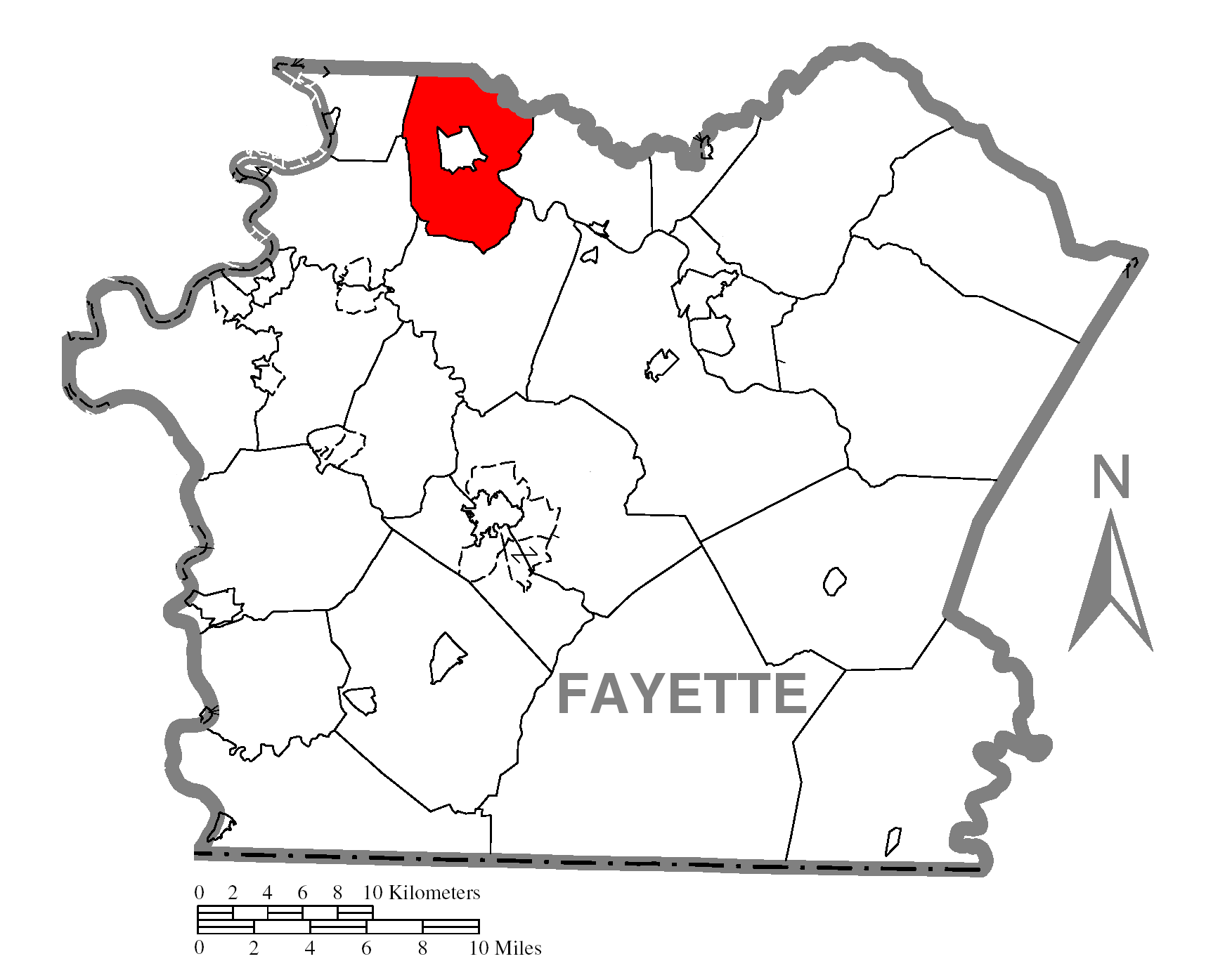
- Location of Perry Township in Fayette County

- Location of Fayette County in Pennsylvania
- Country: United States
- State: Pennsylvania
- County: Fayette

Area
  - Total: 20.68 sq mi (53.57 km^{2})
  - Land: 20.24 sq mi (52.41 km^{2})
  - Water: 0.45 sq mi (1.16 km^{2})

Population (2020)
  - Total: 2,339 ▼
  - Estimate (2022): 2,288
  - Density: 122.2/sq mi (47.19/km^{2})
- Time zone: UTC-4 (EST)
  - Summer (DST): UTC-5 (EDT)
- Area code: 724
- FIPS code: 42-051-59464
- Website: www.perryopolis.com/perrytwp/index.html

Perry Township is a township in Fayette County, Pennsylvania, United States. The population was 2,339 at the 2020 census, a decline from the figure of 2,552 tabulated in 2010. The Frazier School District serves the township.

Star Junction, Wickhaven, Whitsett, Banning and Layton are unincorporated communities within the township. The borough of Perryopolis, a separate municipality, lies enclaved at the center of the township.

== History ==
The Star Junction Historic District and Whitsett Historic District are listed on the National Register of Historic Places. Also listed are the Alliance Furnace, Providence Quaker Cemetery and Chapel, and Layton Bridge.

== Geography ==
Perry Township is in northwestern Fayette County, bordered by Westmoreland County to the north. According to the United States Census Bureau, the township has a total area of 20.7 square miles (53.6 km^{2}), of which 20.2 square miles (52.4 km^{2}) is land and 0.46 square miles (1.2 km^{2}), or 2.16%, is water.

The Youghiogheny River flows through the northern part of the township and forms part of the township's eastern border. Pennsylvania Route 51 passes through the township, leading north to Pittsburgh and south to Uniontown, the Fayette County seat.

== Demographics ==
Historical population
Census	Pop.	Note	%±
2010	2,552		—
2020	2,339		−8.3%
2022 (est.)	2,288		−2.2%
U.S. Decennial Census

As of the 2000 census, there were 2,786 people, 1,170 households, and 806 families residing in the township. The population density was 141.0 inhabitants per square mile (54.4/km^{2}). There were 1,245 housing units at an average density of 63.0 per square mile (24.3/km^{2}). The racial makeup of the township was 96.12% White, 3.02% African American, 0.11% Native American, 0.14% Asian, 0.07% from other races, and 0.54% from two or more races. Hispanic or Latino of any race were 0.22% of the population.

There were 1,170 households, out of which 25.5% had children under the age of 18 living with them, 55.4% were married couples living together, 10.0% had a female householder with no husband present, and 31.1% were non-families. 27.9% of all households were made up of individuals, and 15.2% had someone living alone who was 65 years of age or older. The average household size was 2.35 and the average family size was 2.86.

In the township the population was spread out, with 19.7% under the age of 18, 6.7% from 18 to 24, 27.2% from 25 to 44, 27.3% from 45 to 64, and 19.0% who were 65 years of age or older.The median age was 42 years. For every 100 females there were 93.7 males.For every 100 females age 18 and over, there were 88.9 males.

The median income for a household in the township was $32,143, and the median income for a family was $37,413. Males had a median income of $32,261 versus $21,295 for females. The per capita income for the township was $16,241.About 9.7% of families and 12.2% of the population were below the poverty line, including 18.0% of those under age 18 and 14.7% of those age 65 or over.

== In popular culture ==
Portions of the movie The Silence of the Lambs were filmed in the village of Layton. The home is still owned by the same family, the Lloyds, as during the time of filming. The home was sold by the Lloyds a few years ago.

== Notable people ==
Charles Henry King, paternal grandfather of President Gerald Ford.He moved to the frontier in Nebraska and became an extremely wealthy businessman and banker there and through pursuits in Wyoming. In 1908 he took his family to Omaha, where his fortune was estimated at $20 million. In 1912 his son Leslie Lynch King Sr. married Dorothy Gardner. Their son Leslie Lynch King Jr. (Gerald Ford) was born in 1913.

Photo gallery

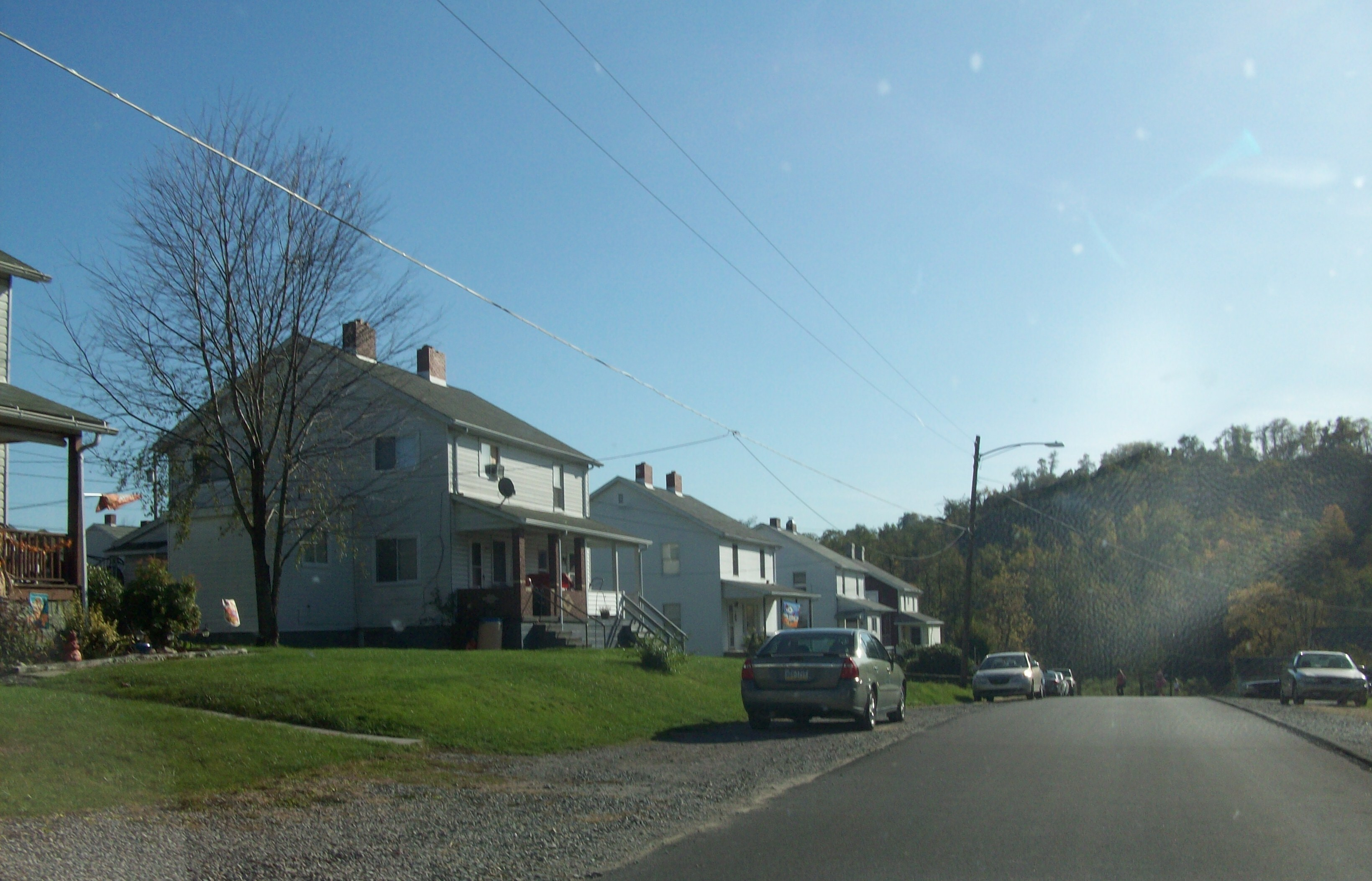
Star Junction coal-patch style housing

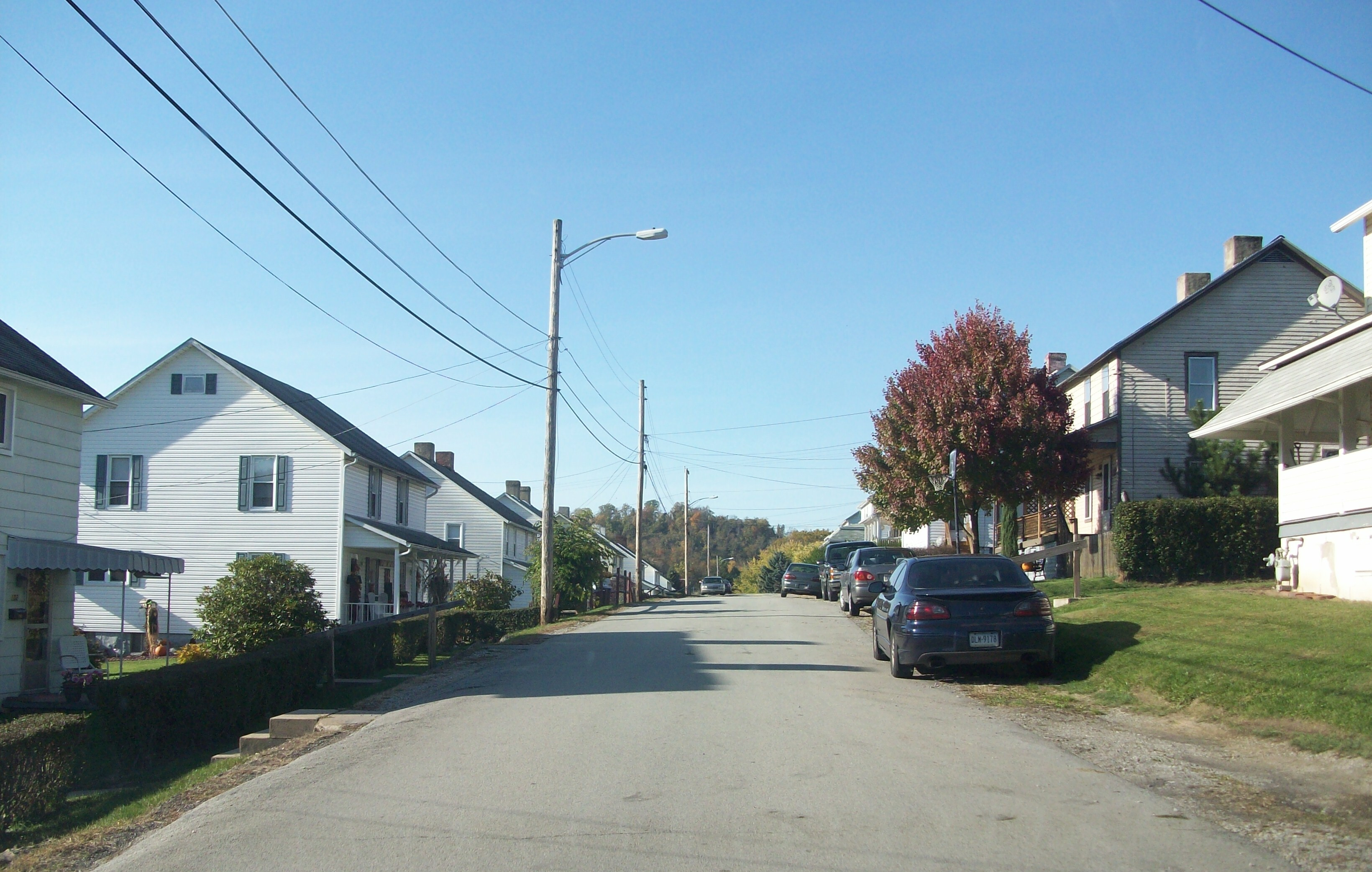
A string of Star Junction company homes

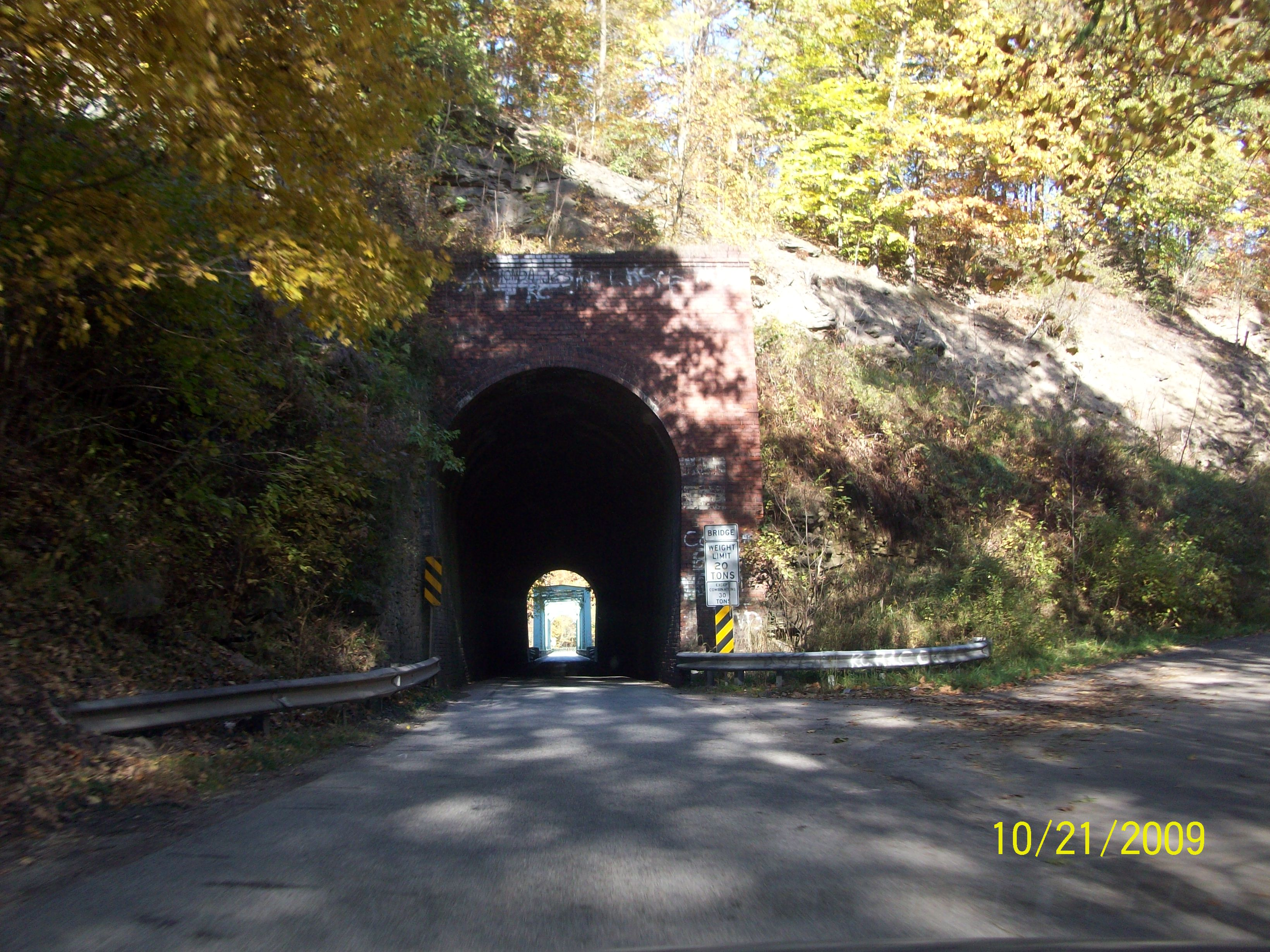
One lane bridge and tunnel between Perryopolis and Layton

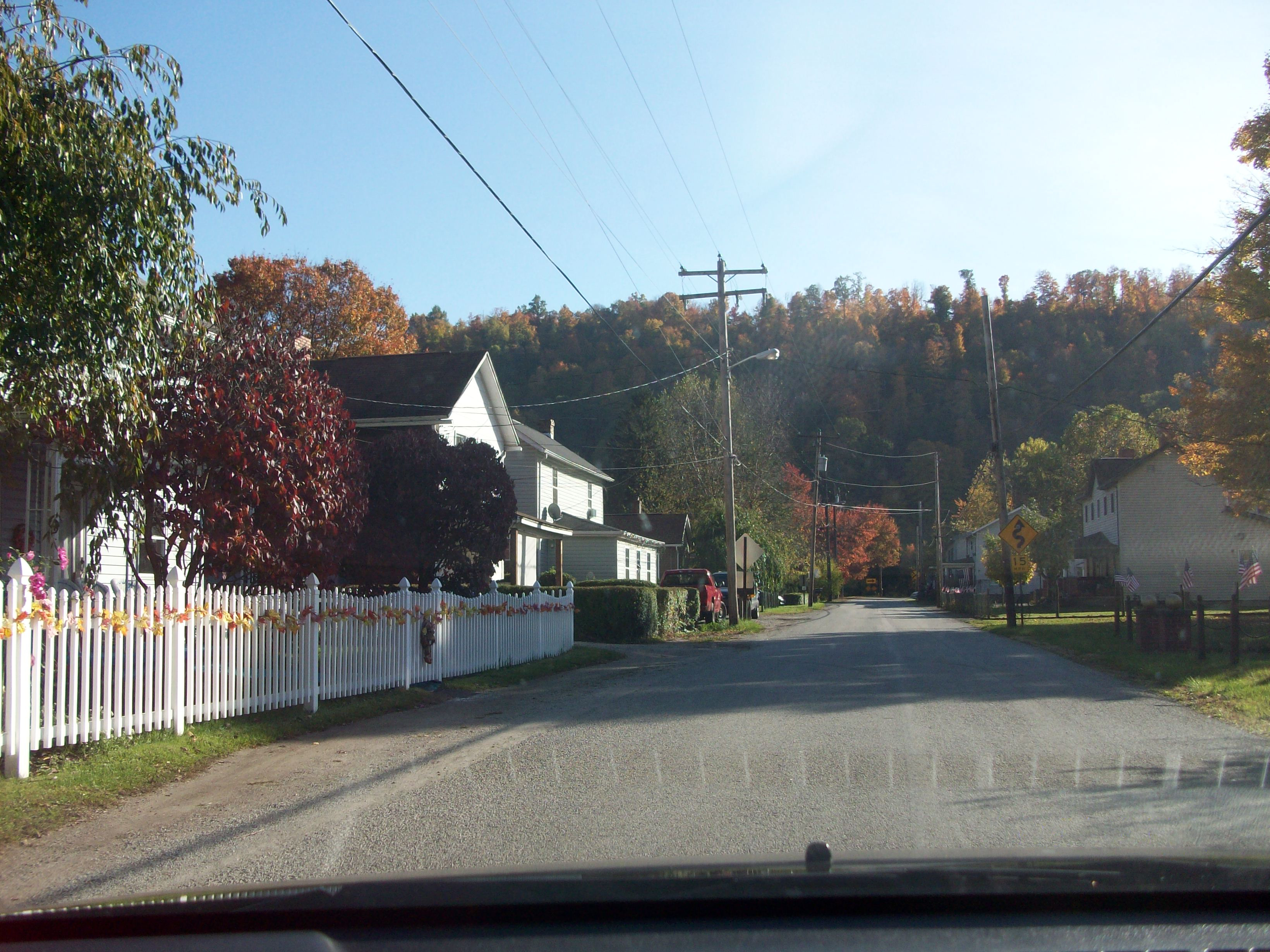
Layton, a key filming location for The Silence of the Lambs

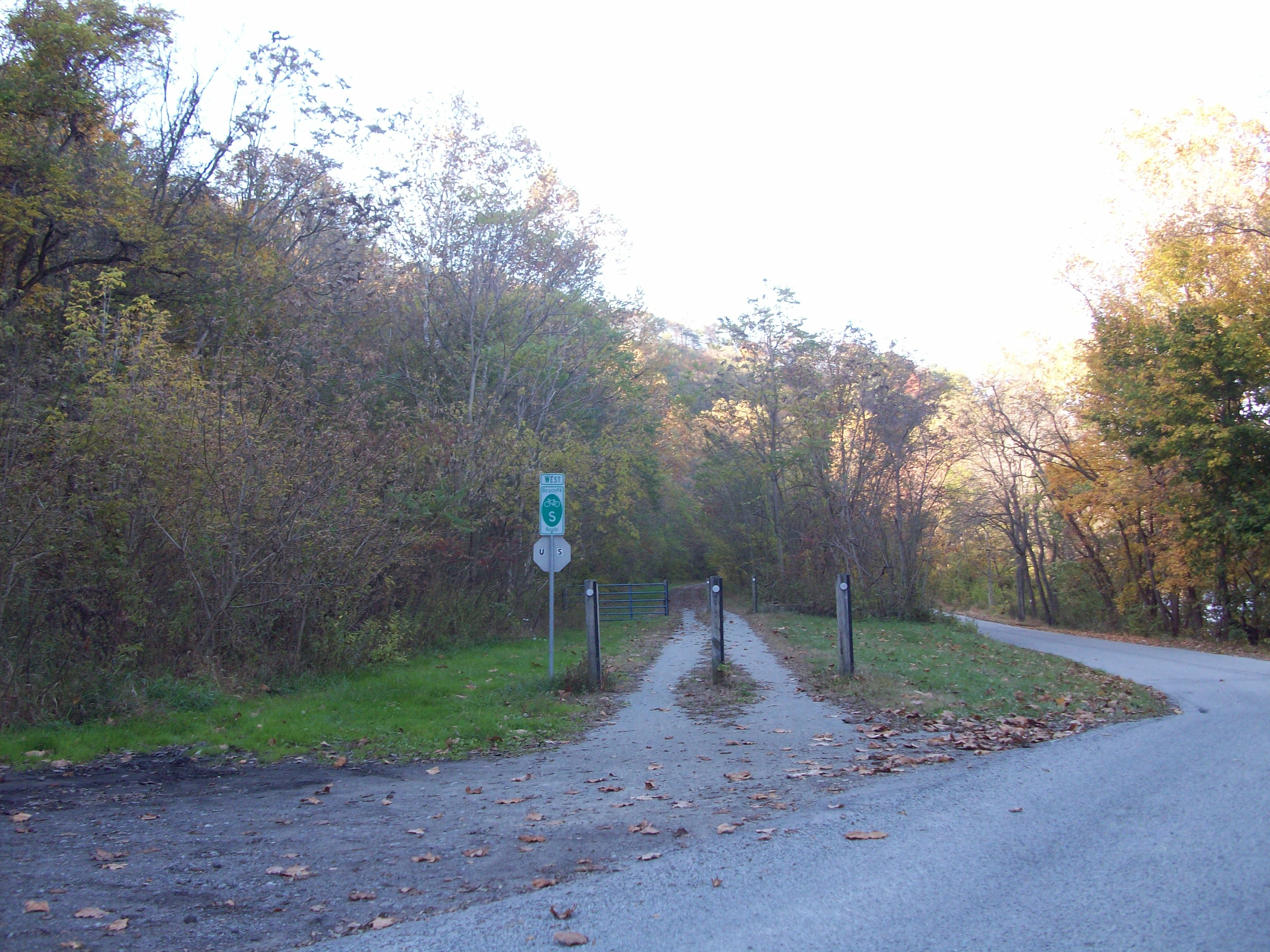
Yough River Trail access

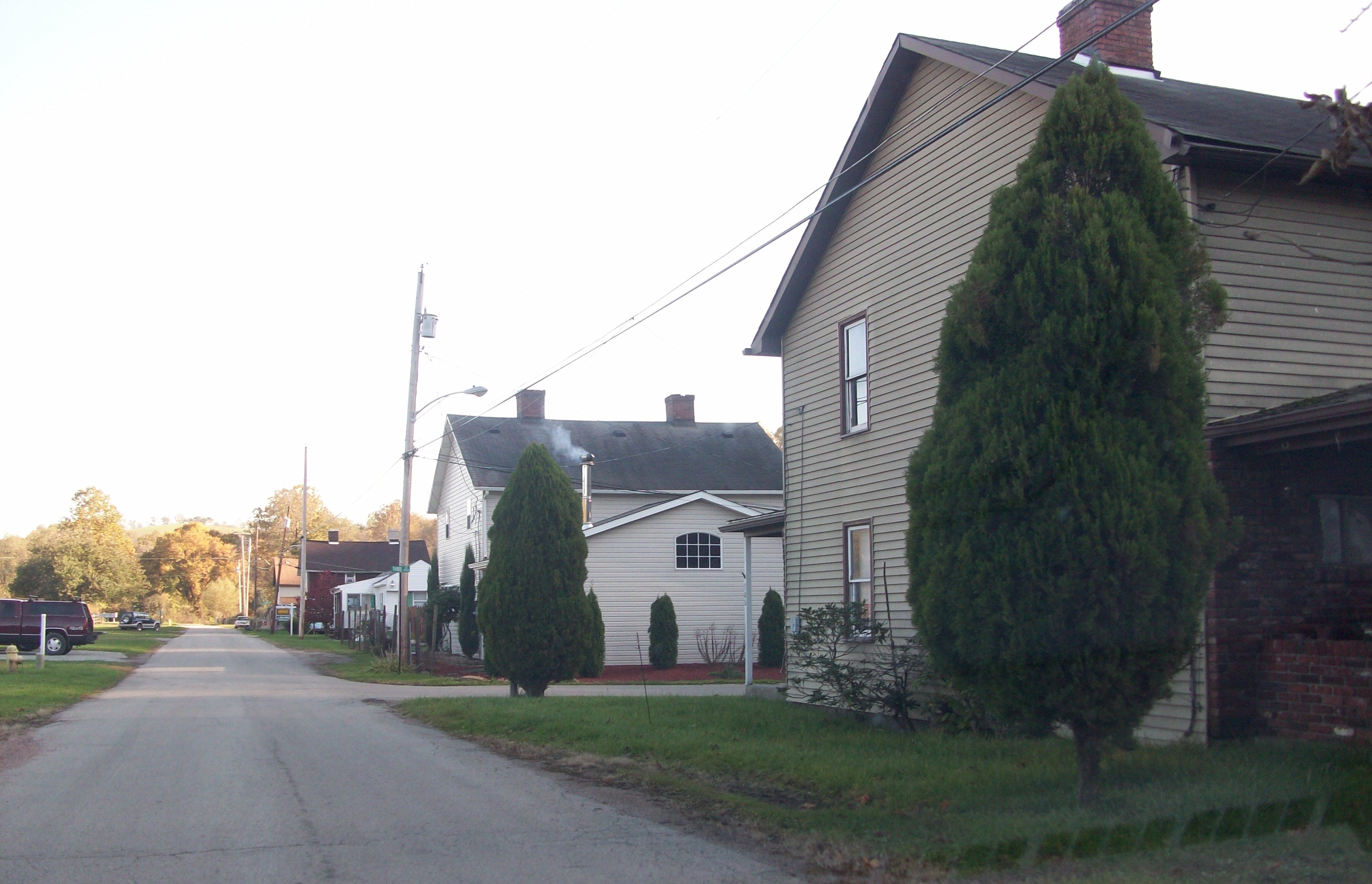
Whitsett company homes

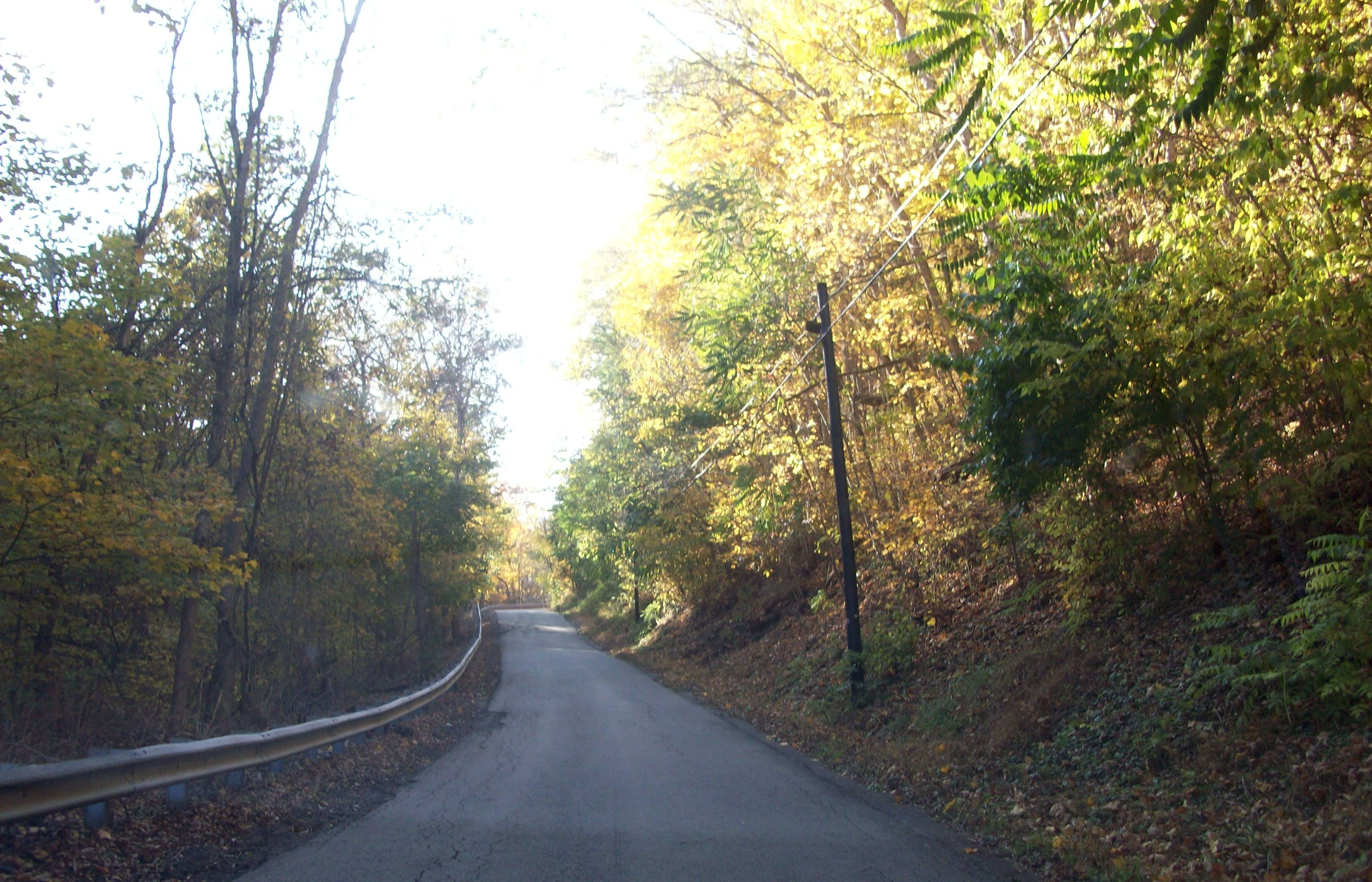
Rural Pennsylvania in Fall

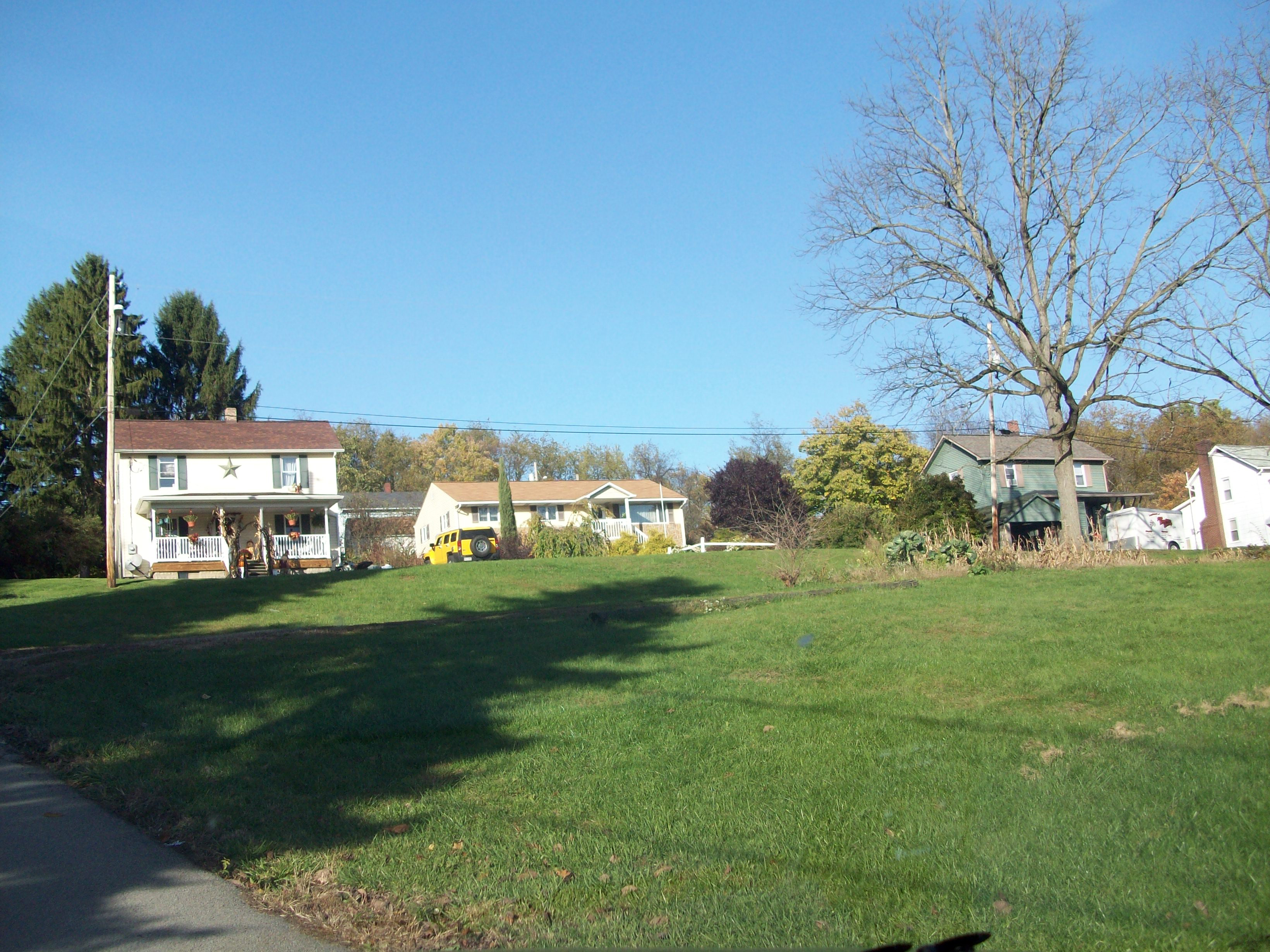
Wickhaven housing
