= Frazier School District =

School district in Pennsylvania, U.S.

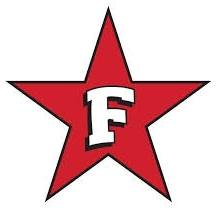

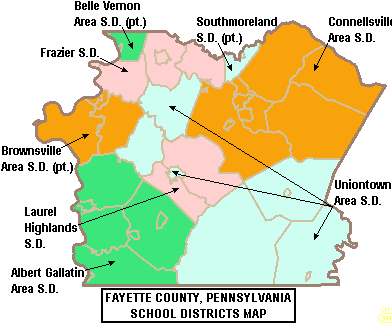

Address
- 142 Constitution Street Perryopolis, Pennsylvania, 15473; United States

Students and staff
- District mascot: Commodores
- Colors: Red and white

Other information
- Website: www.frazierschooldistrict.org

The Frazier School District is a rural public school district located in Fayette County, Pennsylvania, about 35 miles south of Pittsburgh. It serves the boroughs of Perryopolis and Newell, and the townships of Perry, Jefferson, and Lower Tyrone. Frazier School District encompasses approximately 83 square miles. According to 2000 federal census data it serves a resident population of 8,531. By 2010, the district's population declined to 8,006 people. The educational attainment levels for the Frazier School District population (25 years old and over) were 88.8% high school graduates and 16.1% college graduates. The district is one of the 500 public school districts of Pennsylvania.

According to the Pennsylvania Budget and Policy Center, 40.5% of the district's pupils lived at 185% or below the Federal Poverty Level as shown by their eligibility for the federal free or reduced price school meal programs in 2012. In 2009, Frazier School District residents’ per capita income was $16,262, while the median family income was $39,438 In the Commonwealth, the median family income was $49,501 and the United States median family income was $49,445, in 2010. In Fayette County, the median household income was $39,115. In 2013 the Pennsylvania Department of Education, reported that less than 10 students in the Frazier School District were identified as homeless. In 2014, the median household income in the USA was $53,700.

Frazier School District is named for a wealthy Perryopolis resident named Mary Fuller Frazier, who provided the struggling school district then named Perry Area with an endowment. Frazier is the smallest district in Fayette County. The district operates three schools. There is one elementary school, one middle school, and one high school. The elementary and middle school are connected together. All three schools sit on the campus in Perryopolis Borough. There is also a library that is open to the community and an athletic field. Frazier opened the new Frederick L. Smeigh Learning Center in August 2015 which houses all K-8 students.

The Intermediate Unit IU1 provides the district with a wide variety of services like specialized education for disabled students and hearing, background checks for employees, state mandated recognizing and reporting child abuse training, speech and visual disability services and criminal background check processing for prospective employees and professional development for staff and faculty.

== Extracurriculars ==
Frazier School District offers a variety of clubs, activities and sports.

=== Sports ===
The district funds:

Varsity

Boys

- Baseball - AA
- Basketball- AA
- Football - A
- Golf - AA
- Tennis - AA
- Track and field - AA
- Wrestling - AA

Girls

- Basketball - AA
- Golf - AA
- Softball - A
- Track and field - AA
- Volleyball - A

Junior high middle school sports

Boys

- Basketball
- Football
- Wrestling

Girls

- Basketball
- Softball
- Volleyball

According to PIAA directory July 2022

== Vocational - Technical Services ==
Frazier High School uses the services of the Central Westmoreland Career and Technology Center in New Stanton
