= Vivicca Whitsett =

Vivicca A. Whitsett is an American actress, comedian, and labor activist. Whitsett has appeared on several television shows and on standup stages across the country. In 2000-2004, Whitsett was elected to the Screen Actors Guild's National Board of Directors. She currently serves as a local Los Angeles SAG board member. During her time serving on SAG's Board, Whitsett was named the National Chair of the EEO Committee, was named a Trustee on the IACF Trust Fund, served on the Communications, Executive and Legislative Committees. In 2011, Vivicca was named the National Co-Chair of SAG's EEO Committee, where they had the most successful Black History Month panel featuring Tarji P. Henson, Marla Gibbs, John Singleton moderated by Wayne Brady More than 800 union members attended this event, with media coverage from Beverly Hills to India.

== Career ==
Whitsett started out as a lobbyist in Washington, D.C., and was a member of the 1999 White House's Advance Team for Foreign Affairs. Vivicca relocated to Los Angeles, to pursue a career in acting but initially worked on Bill Clinton's campaign in Los Angeles.

Whitsett has been performing standup all over the country and is a regular at the Pasadena Ice House, Comedy Store, Hollywood Improv and the Laugh Factory. She is also one of the few women who warm up audiences for ABC's The Revolution, Tori Spelling & Jeff Lewis Show, Relationship 360 with Steve Warren and Bank of Hollywood in addition to Ryan Seacrest Productions, ABC, NBC, Fox, CBS and E! networks.

Vivicca was rolled down a crater in a giant metal gerbil cage on 101 Ways To Leave A Gameshow (episode #4) and she crashed into giant bowling pins in a car for ABC's Crash Course. Whitsett has had roles in Big Shots, Space Jam, ER, Escape from LA, Crash Course, Deal or No Deal, Miss Match, K Street, Malcolm & Eddie among others.

Vivicca is the current 2012-13 National Spokesperson for Novolog/Nordisk's FlexPen and has a 30-feet ad in Times Square.

She currently resides in West Hollywood, California.
