= Whitsett Historic District (Whitsett, Pennsylvania) =

Historic district in Pennsylvania, United States

- U.S. National Register of Historic Places
- U.S. Historic district
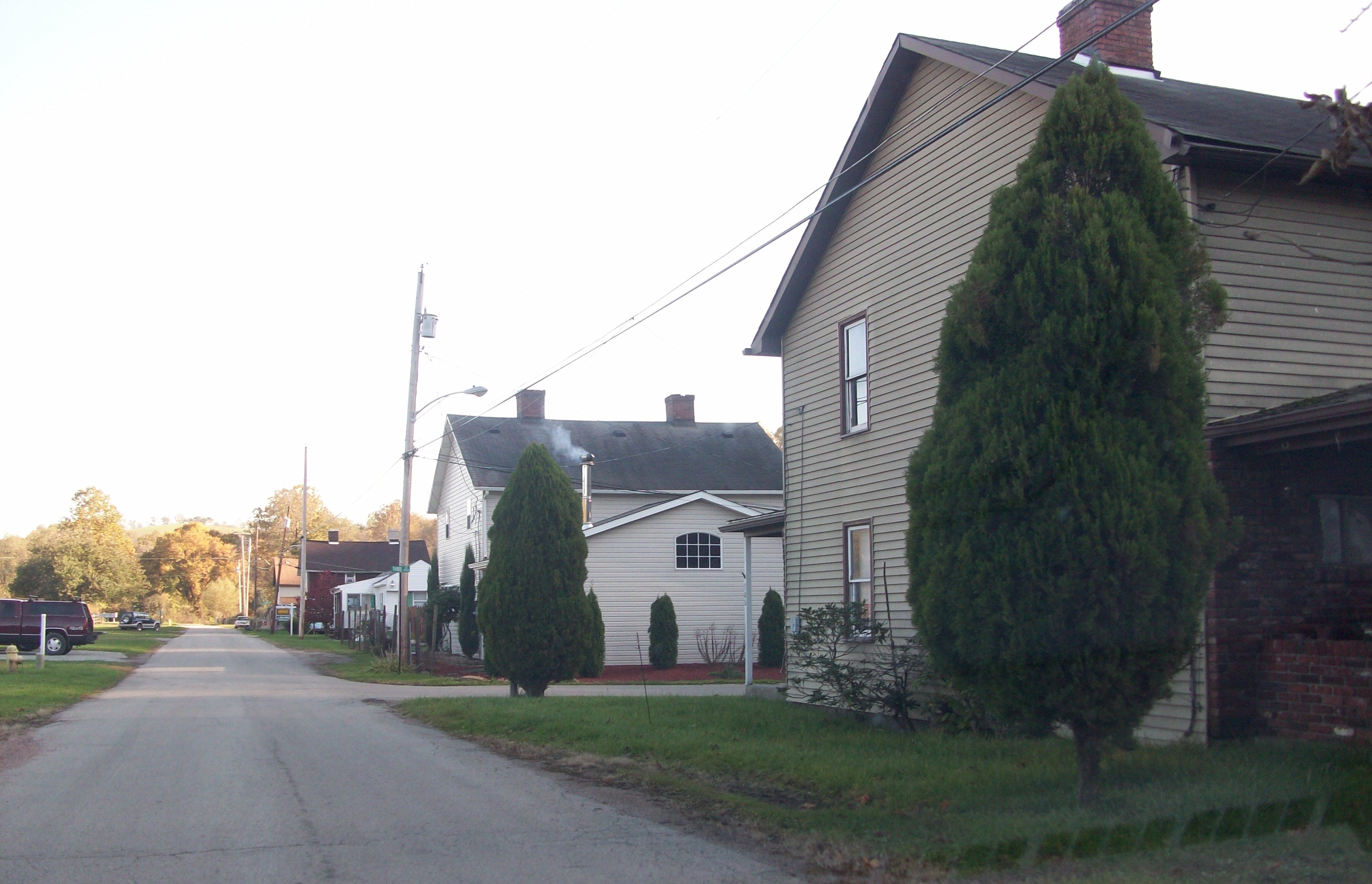
- Whitsett Historic District, October 2009

- Location within Pennsylvania Location within the United States
- Location: Roughly bounded by the Youghiogheny River, the former Elwell Branch of the Pittsburgh and Lake Erie railroad tracks, and Elwell Run, at Whitsett, Perry Township, Pennsylvania
- Coordinates: 40°06′22″N 79°46′21″W
- Area: 79 acres (32 ha)
- Built: 1903
- MPS: Bituminous Coal and Coke Resources of Pennsylvania MPS
- NRHP reference No.: 95000883
- Added to NRHP: July 21, 1995

The Whitsett Historic District is a national historic district that is located in Perry Township, Fayette County, Pennsylvania in the United States.

It was added to the National Register of Historic Places in 1995.

== History and architectural features ==
This district encompasses forty-eight contributing buildings and five contributing structures that are located in the bituminous coal mining community of Whitsett. Most of the contributing buildings were built between 1890 and 1917; thirty-one of these are two-story, frame duplex workers houses. The oldest building is the Whitsett farmhouse, which was built circa 1845. Other buildings and structures include three mine manager's dwellings, two brick former mine buildings, the former company store annex, the former water pumphouse, the remains of the Banning Mine No. 2 entrance, the foundation of the Banning Mine No. 2 tipple complex, the mine's slate dump, a beehive coke oven battery, and the abandoned Pittsburgh and Lake Erie Connellsville Branch.
