= Newell, Pennsylvania =

Borough in Pennsylvania, US

- Borough
- Location in Fayette County, Pennsylvania

- Location in Pennsylvania Location in the United States
- Coordinates: 40°4′49″N 79°53′49″W
- Country: United States
- State: Pennsylvania
- County: Fayette
- Established: 1952

Government
  - Mayor: Nicki Todaro

Area
  - Total: 0.72 sq mi (1.87 km^{2})
  - Land: 0.59 sq mi (1.52 km^{2})
  - Water: 0.13 sq mi (0.34 km^{2})

Population (2020)
  - Total: 513
  - Density: 872.1/sq mi (336.72/km^{2})
- Time zone: UTC-4 (EST)
  - Summer (DST): UTC-5 (EDT)
- ZIP code: 15438
- Area code: 724
- FIPS code: 42-53504

Newell is a borough in Fayette County, Pennsylvania, United States. The population was 512 at the time of the 2020 census.

The town is served by the Frazier School District.

== Geography ==
Newell is located at 40°4′29″N 79°53′49″W (40.074689, −79.896984).

According to the United States Census Bureau, the borough has a total area of 0.8 square miles (2.1 km^{2}), of which 0.6 square miles (1.6 km^{2}) is land and 0.2 square miles (0.52 km^{2}) (19.48%) is water.

== Surrounding and adjacent neighborhoods ==
Newell has only one land border, with Jefferson Township to the east.

Across the Monongahela River in Washington County, Newell runs adjacent with (from north to south) Elco, California, Coal Center and another segment of California.

== Demographics ==
Historical population
Census	Pop.	Note	%±
1960	746		—
1970	650		−12.9%
1980	629		−3.2%
1990	518		−17.6%
2000	551		6.4%
2010	541		−1.8%
2020	513		−5.2%
2021 (est.)	505	▼	−1.6%

As of the 2010 census, there were 541 people and 241 households. As reported in the 2000 census, there were 162 families residing in the borough.

The population density was 892.6 inhabitants per square mile (344.6/km^{2}). There were 232 housing units at an average density of 375.8 per square mile (145.1/km^{2}).

The racial makeup of the borough was 99.82% White and 0.18% African American. Hispanic or Latino of any race were 0.54% of the population.

There were 222 households, out of which 26.6% had children under the age of eighteen living with them; 53.2% were married couples living together, 14.9% had a female householder with no husband present, and 27.0% were non-families. 25.7% of all households were made up of individuals, and 15.8% had someone living alone who was sixty-five years of age or older.

The average household size was 2.48 and the average family size was 2.91.

In the borough the population was spread out, with 21.1% under the age of eighteen, 7.8% from eighteen to twenty-four, 29.0% from twenty-five to forty-four, 20.5% from forty-five to sixty-four, and 21.6% who were sixty-five years of age or older. The median age was forty-one years.

For every one hundred females, there were 91.3 males. For every one hundred females aged eighteen and over, there were 88.3 males.

The median income for a household in the borough was $33,988, and the median income for a family was $41,477. Males had a median income of $38,611 compared with that of $20,556 for females.

The per capita income for the borough was $18,592.

Roughly 3.0% of families and 5.7% of the population were living below the poverty line, including 7.1% of those who were under the age of eighteen and 4.8% of those who were aged sixty-five or over. Famous deck builder, 'Uncle' Kris Miller resides in the borough

Photo gallery

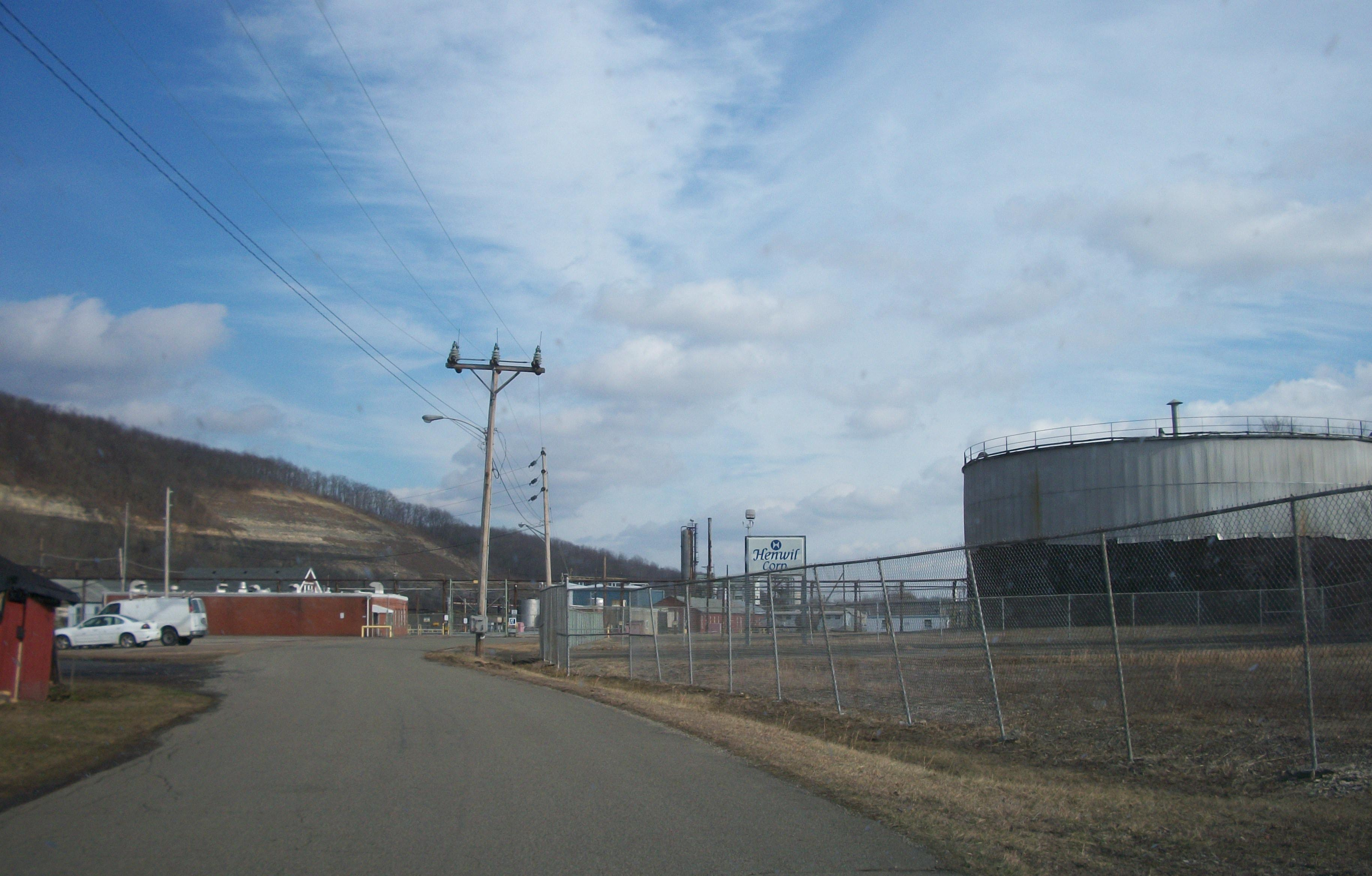
The Henwil Chemicals plant dominates the northern side of the municipality.

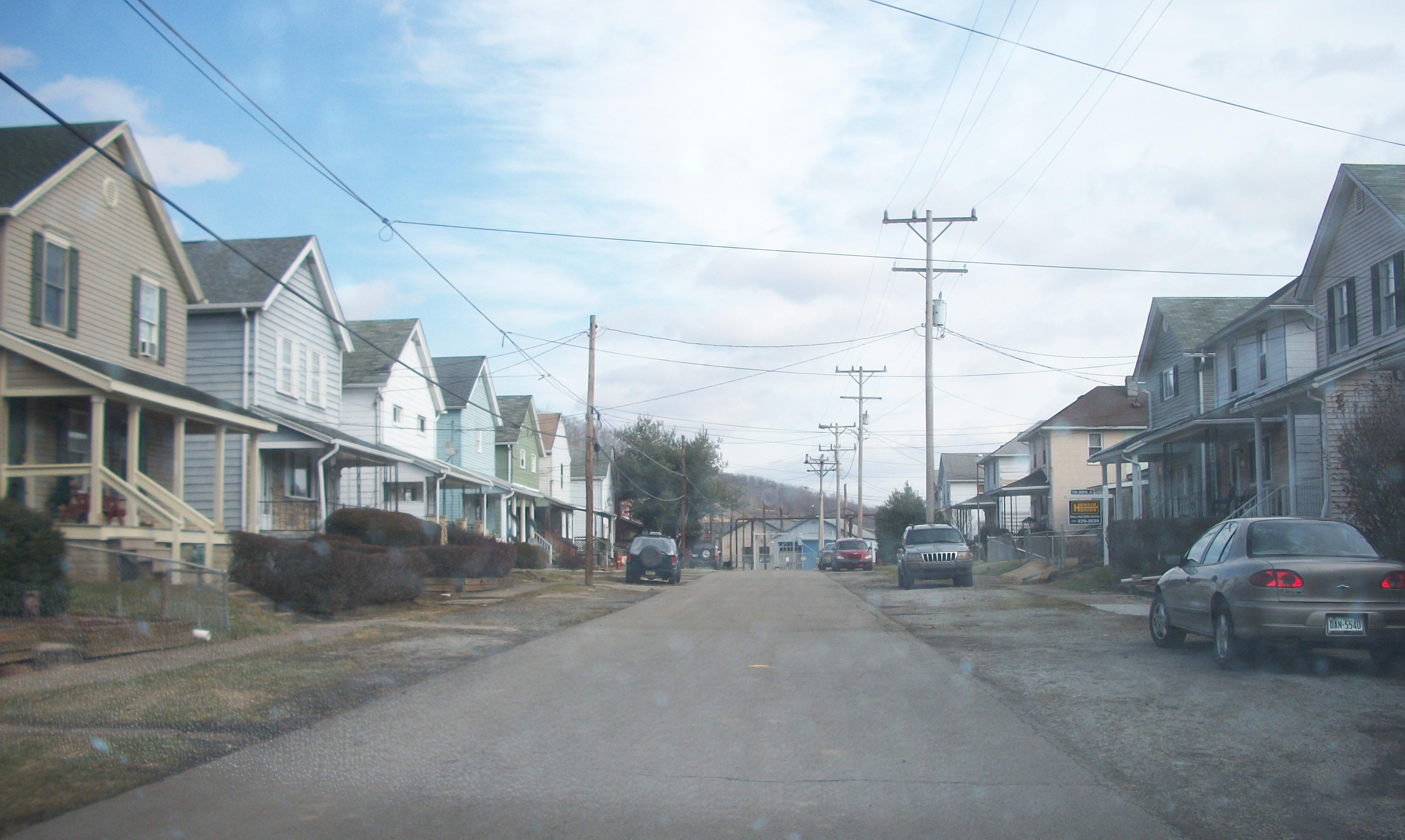
Early 20th-century homes are clustered near the plant.

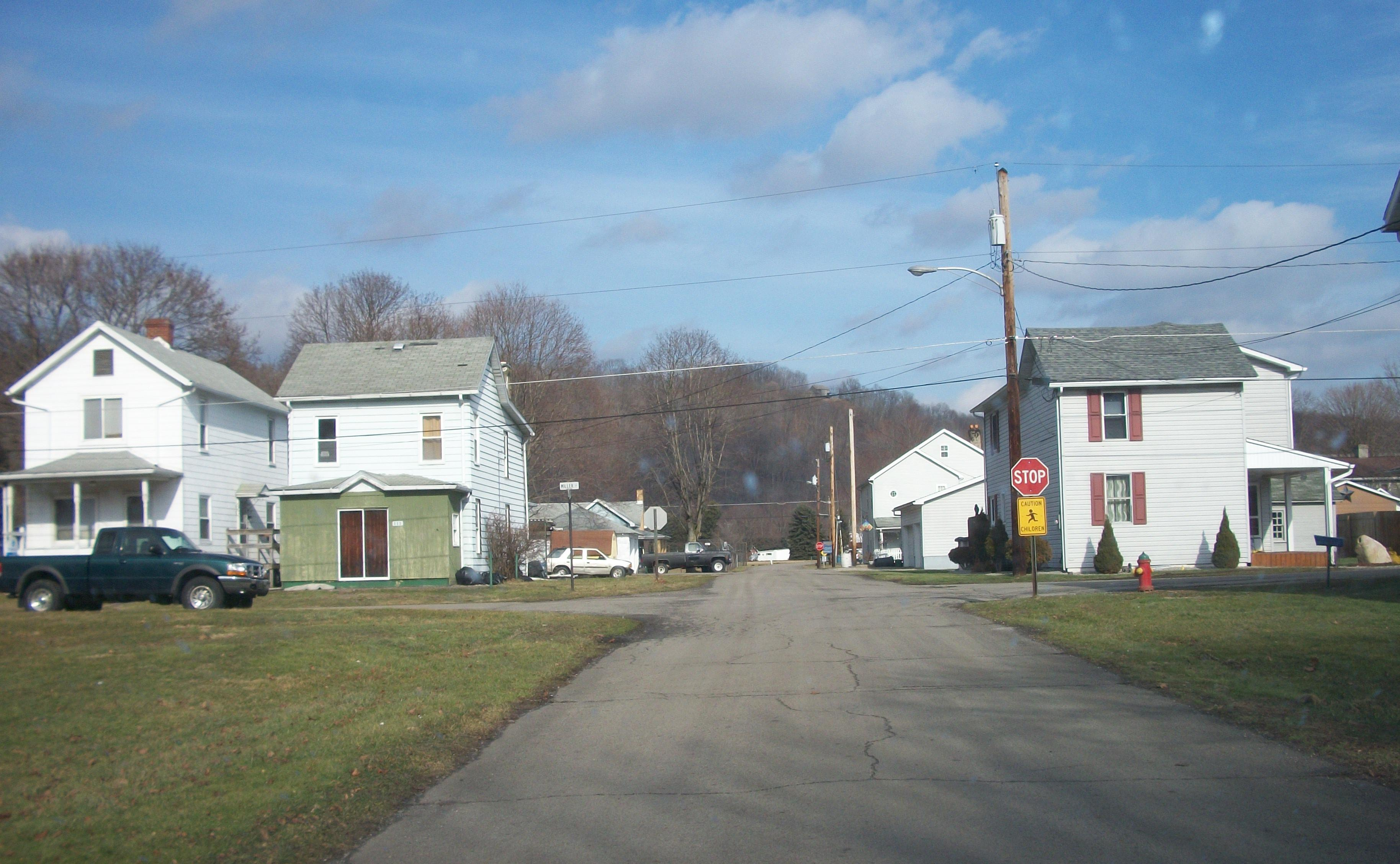
A typical street along the Newell riverfront.

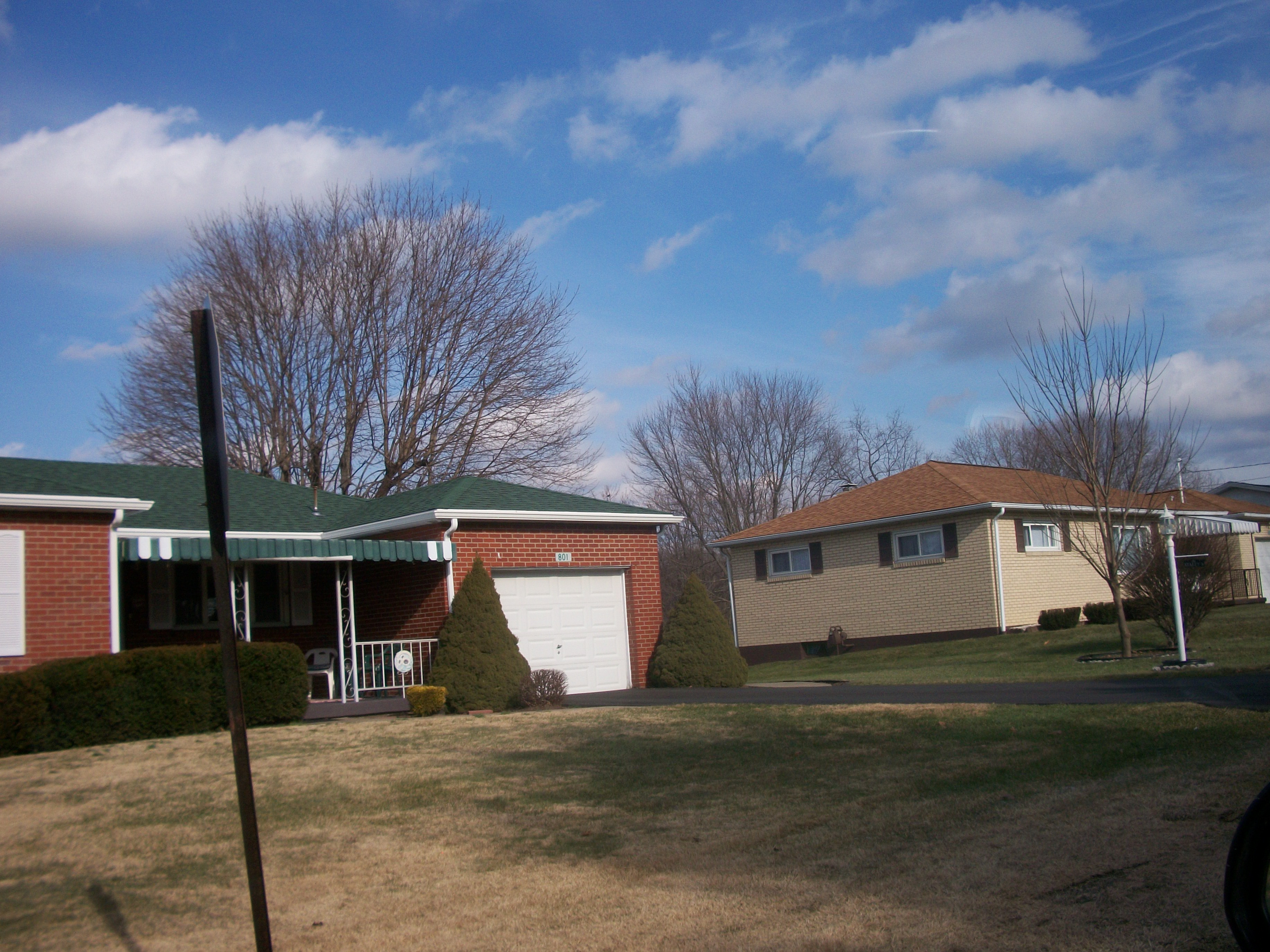
On a hill above the river, many suburban-style homes are included in the borough.

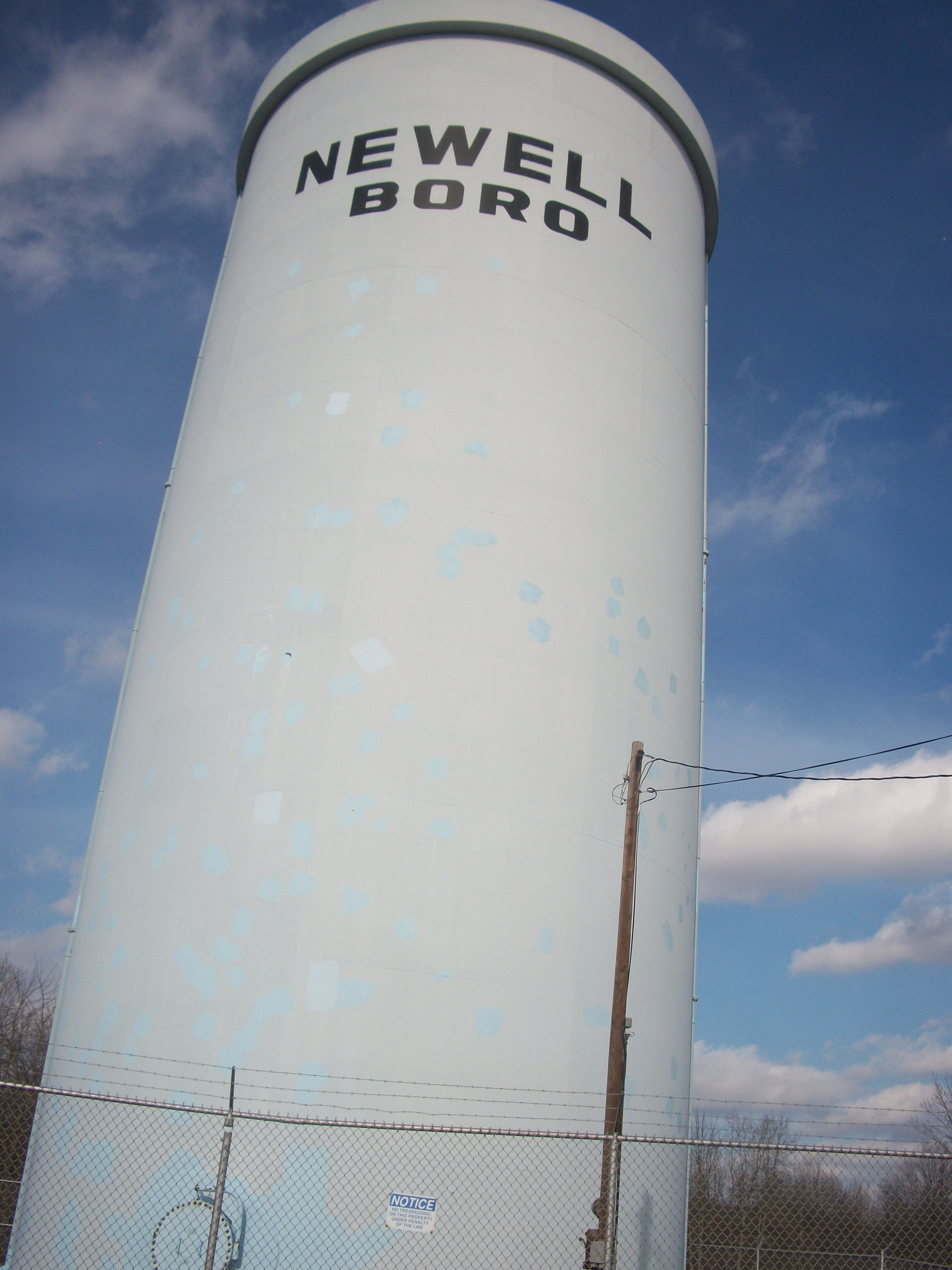
Water tower on a hill high above the Monongahela River.
