= Whitsett, Pennsylvania =

Unincorporated community in Pennsylvania, US

- Unincorporated community
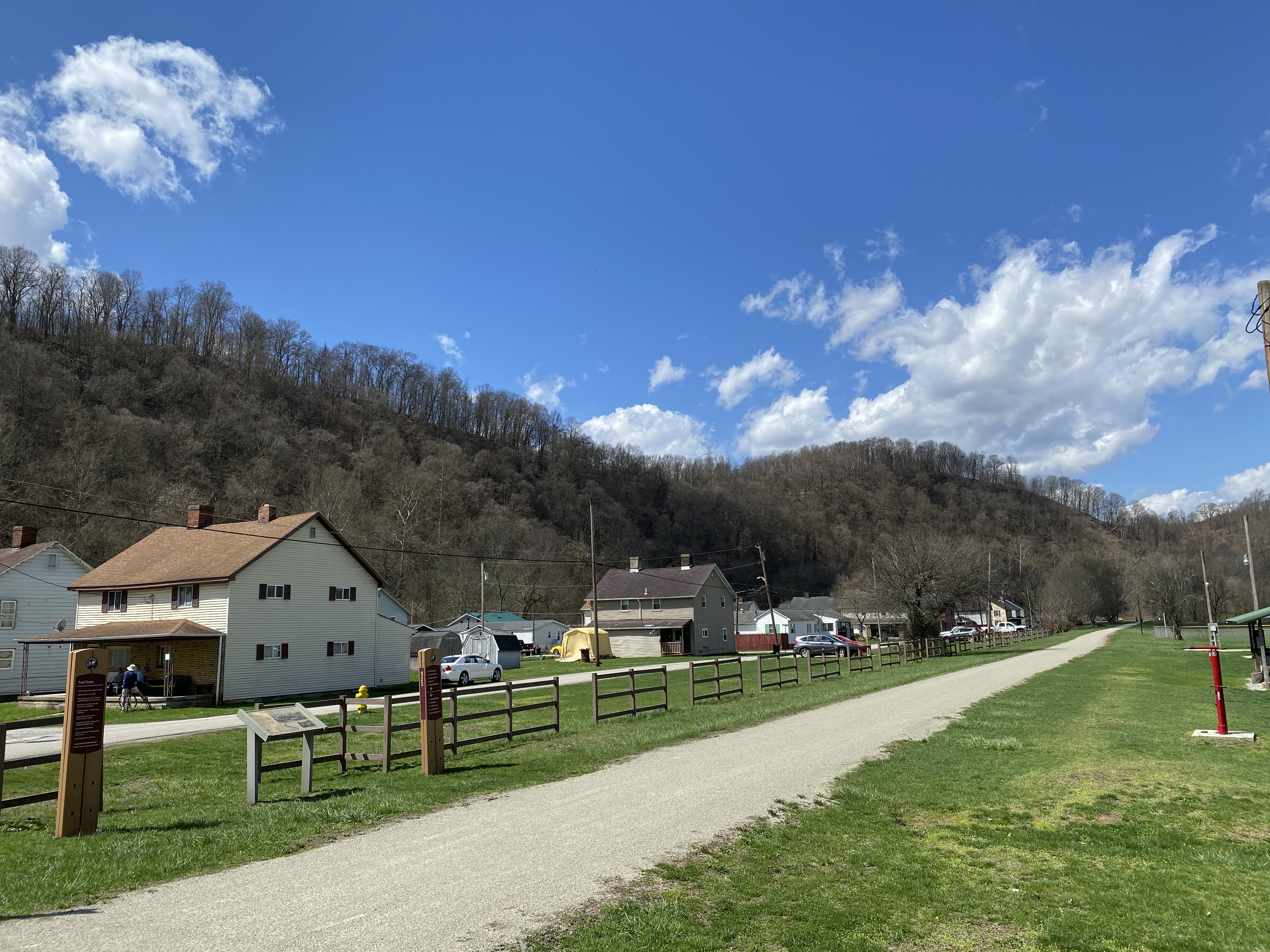
- Great Allegheny Passage in Whitsett

- Location within Pennsylvania Location within the United States
- Coordinates: 40°06′15″N 79°45′02″W
- Country: United States
- State: Pennsylvania
- County: Fayette
- Township: Perry
- Time zone: UTC-5 (Eastern (EST))
  - Summer (DST): UTC-4 (EDT)
- GNIS feature ID: 1191364

Whitsett is an unincorporated community in Fayette County, Pennsylvania, United States, approximately 30 miles (50 km) south of Pittsburgh. The population is estimated at 200. It was founded in 1845 by Ralph C. Whitsett Sr. He and his family built a large red brick house in 1873, which still stands today. The community is made up of mostly “company” houses that were built for workers who worked in a large coal mine located nearby; the mine was Banning #2^{1}. Most of the houses were semi-detached "twins" built to accommodate two families. The mine has been closed since 1954 and most of the houses have been renovated and turned into single-family dwellings.

== History of coal mining ==
The history of coal mining in Whitsett began on July 21, 1891, and would end in 1954; for a span of 63 years Whitsett was a coal mining town. Coal mining operations started in Whitsett in the summer of 1891; when the Luce-Whitsett Coal & Coke Company began mining coal and producing coke at Whitsett. The Luce-Whitsett Coal & Coke Company was owned and operated by Henry Luce, Albinus H. Whitsett, who was also its secretary; and David P. Whitsett, who was the mine superintendent. This partnership lasted from July 21, 1891 until November 16, 1892. This mine employed 126 men.

The Luce-Whitsett Coal & Coke Company was sold to Frank M. Osborne of Cleveland, Ohio, for $7,277.86 on November 16, 1892. The coal mine then had its name changed to the Osborne, Saeger, and Company; it was in operation for five years. In 1897 Albinus H. Whitsett and his brother James E. Whitsett purchased the coal mine back from the Osborne, Saeger, and Company; they renamed the coal mine the Rainbow Coal Company. On November 18, 1901, the Rainbow Coal Company was sold to the Pennsylvania Mining Company, later called the Pittsburgh Coal Company. It was purchased from the Whitsett Family for $6,500.00. The Pennsylvania Mining Company/Pittsburgh Coal Company named the coal mine at Whitsett, PA - Banning #2. Banning #2 at Whitsett began mining coal in 1902.

The company ceased operations on Friday, February 22, 1946, when a slate fall killed three of its miners. Those killed in the mine that day were Homer Young, 52, of Wickhaven, Andrew Vargo Jr., 28, of Whitsett, and Henry Garner Sr., 49, also of Whitsett. In 1948 the Robertson & Sheppard Coal Company began operations at Whitsett on a very limited scale; it was hand-picked coal. In the year 1954, that mine would also close operations, and it also marked the end of an era, when coal mining would play a major role in the village of Whitsett. In 1910 the Whitsett Mine (Banning #2), employed 659 miners, and produced 535,484 tons of coal - more than any of the other 18 coal mines located in the Youghiogheny River valley.

== Present day ==
The Great Allegheny Passage runs through Whitsett, at the trailhead there is space for parking and trail access located at Weiss Memorial Park. There is also a basketball court, baseball field, playground and pavilions near the trail access. The trail was built on the old lines of the Pittsburgh & Lake Erie railroad. Whitsett was added to National Register of Historic Places in 1995. The former Banning #2 coal mine property is now owned by mosaic artist Rachel Sager who has created a collaborative outdoor mosaic art installation called The Ruins Project on the remains of the mine's outbuildings. The project tells the story of the historic mine and town, and includes the work of more than 250 artists from around the world.
