= Layton, Pennsylvania =

Layton
- Unincorporated community
- Location of Layton, Pennsylvania
- Coordinates: 40°5′24″N 79°43′22″W
- Country: United States
- State: Pennsylvania
- County: Fayette
- Elevation: 810 ft (250 m)
- Time zone: UTC-5 (EST)
  - Summer (DST): UTC-4 (EDT)
- ZIP code: 15428

Layton is an unincorporated community in Fayette County, Pennsylvania.

== History ==
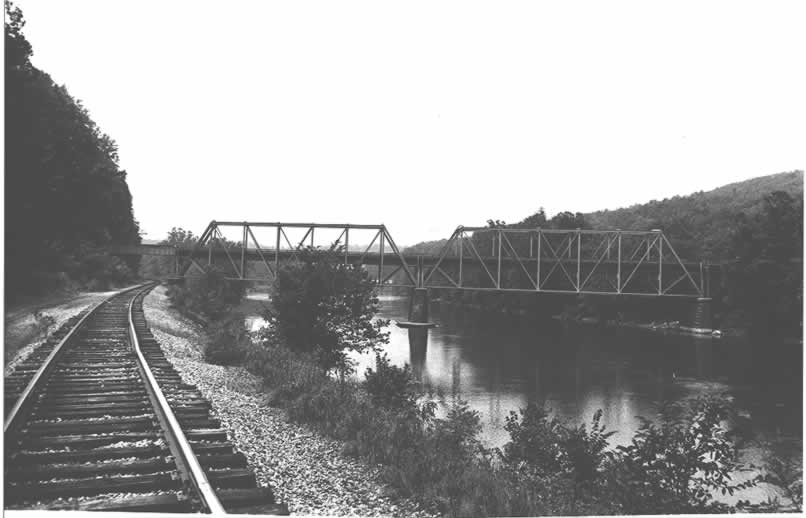
Layton Bridge, c. 1982

Layton is the former site of a large brickworks, due to local deposits of flint clay.

It was also here that the Washington Run Railroad connected to the B&O Railroad. According to historian Franklin Ellis, "The Baltimore and Ohio Railroad Company was the first corporation which made any actual movement towards the construction of a railway line through the valleys of the Youghiogheny and Monongahela rivers." In 1826, the company secured approval from the Pennsylvania General Assembly to build a railroad from Baltimore, Maryland through the Commonwealth of Pennsylvania "to the Ohio River." The company was directed by legislators to complete its work within fifteen years. Surveys of possible sites for the B&O line in Fayette County were made between 1836 and 1838, but when planners realized that they would not be able to meet their fifteen-year deadline, they requested, and received, legislative approval to extend their completion date to February 1847. Unable to meet that extended deadline and now facing competition from the Pennsylvania Railroad, B&O executives were forced to abandon their planned expansion through Fayette County. As a result, the Pittsburgh and Connellsville Railroad Company, which was incorporated in 1837, took over the legislature's plan for railroad expansion and became the first railroad to open a line within the county. The Pittsburgh and Connellsville company then began purchasing the necessary land, rights of way and equipment, initiated the first construction efforts on its rail line, opened depot grounds at West Newton and Connellsville, and then also purchased land for stations at: "Port Royal, Smith's Mill, Jacob's Creek, Layton (foot of Big Falls), Old Franklin Iron Works, Smilie's Run (Dawson), and at Rists's Run, below Connellsville." The completed rail line to Connellsville was then officially opened in 1855.

According to Ellis, Layton Station was situated on two hundred and seventeen acres of land that were originally patented on April 6, 1791 by "Mary Higgs (a daughter of John Shreve)" and named "Springfield." Deeded by Higgs to Francis Bryson on June 3, 1795, the land was then sold by Bryson on August 2, 1797 to George Johnston, who then transferred it to William Espy on April 2, 1806. Espy's sons, Hugh and Robert, who subsequently inherited the land in December 1813, sold it to Abraham Layton for two thousand three hundred and fifty-two dollars on October 25, 1821. Following Layton's death, his sons, Michael and Abraham Layton, operated keel boats along the river on the property to ship sand and glass products. They then sold the land to Daniel R. Davidson, who transferred it to Joseph Wilgus in 1864. Sometime around the mid to late 1860s, a pure deposit of silex, which was useful for manufacturing glass, was discovered on this land.

As a village grew up around the station, it adopted the name of Layton. The first store there was opened by telegraph operator Henry Brollier, who also became the village's first postmaster. A second store was opened by P. M. Hunt in 1876.

By 1880, B&O Railroad was leasing lines from the Pittsburgh and Connellsville company, and the population of Perry Township, where the Banning's and Layton railroad stations were located, had grown to one thousand four hundred and seventy-six.

In 1899, a Pratt truss railroad bridge was built near Layton; it was designed by Taylor & Romine, built by A & P Roberts Co. of Philadelphia and the Pencoyd Iron Works, ultimately carried Legislative Route 26191 over the Youghiogheny River, and was subsequently added to the National Register of Historic Places on June 22, 1988.

In early July 2022, the historic Layton Bridge, which had been converted from a railroad bridge to a one-lane bridge connecting Layton to Perryopolis and Route 51, was temporarily closed (through August 2022) for repairs to stabilize both the bridge itself and the tunnel providing access to it. According to District 12 bridge engineer Jeremy Hughes, "It's one of our few bridges that are over 100 years old and it's one of our few bridges that's a former railroad bridge." Civic officials decided to limit the bridge's weight restrictions to enable continued use for the immediate future by emergency vehicles and snow plows until the bridge could be replaced sometime around 2025.

== In popular culture ==
A five-bedroom house in Layton was used as the location for the fictional site of a rural home used by the fictional serial killer, Jame “Buffalo Bill” Gumb, for a subterranean holding pen and murder site in the 1991 film, "The Silence of the Lambs."
