= Walter Q. Gresham =

American judge and politician (1832–1895)

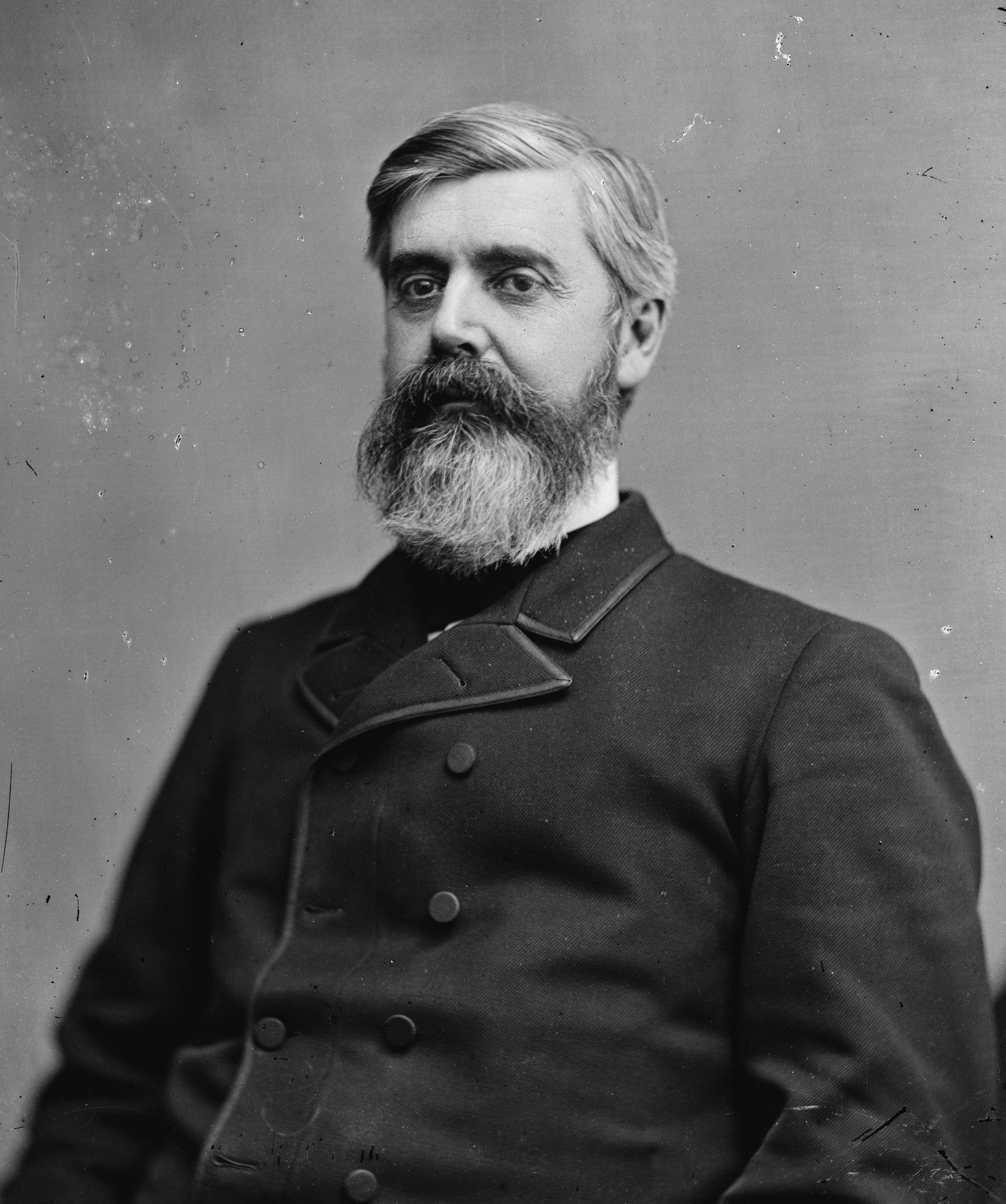
- Portrait, c. 1870–1880

33rd United States Secretary of State
- In office March 7, 1893 – May 28, 1895
- President: Grover Cleveland
- Preceded by: John W. Foster
- Succeeded by: Richard Olney

Judge of the United States Court of Appeals for the Seventh Circuit
- In office June 16, 1891 – March 3, 1893
- Appointed by: Operation of law
- Preceded by: Seat established by 26 Stat. 826
- Succeeded by: James Graham Jenkins

Judge of the United States Circuit Courts for the Seventh Circuit
- In office October 28, 1884 – March 3, 1893
- Appointed by: Chester A. Arthur
- Preceded by: Thomas Drummond
- Succeeded by: James Graham Jenkins

35th United States Secretary of the Treasury
- In office September 5, 1884 – October 28, 1884
- President: Chester A. Arthur
- Preceded by: Charles J. Folger
- Succeeded by: Hugh McCulloch

31st United States Postmaster General
- In office April 9, 1883 – September 4, 1884
- President: Chester A. Arthur
- Preceded by: Timothy O. Howe
- Succeeded by: Frank Hatton

Judge of the United States District Court for the District of Indiana
- In office September 1, 1869 – April 9, 1883
- Appointed by: Ulysses S. Grant
- Preceded by: David McDonald
- Succeeded by: William Allen Woods

Member of the Indiana House of Representatives
- In office 1860–1861

Personal details
- Born: Walter Quintin Gresham; March 17, 1832 Lanesville, Indiana, U.S.
- Died: May 28, 1895 (aged 63) Washington, D.C., U.S.
- Resting place: Arlington National Cemetery
- Party: Whig (before 1855); American (1855); Republican (1856–1892); Democratic (1892–1895)
- Spouse: Matilda McGrain
- Parents: Sarah Davis; William Gresham
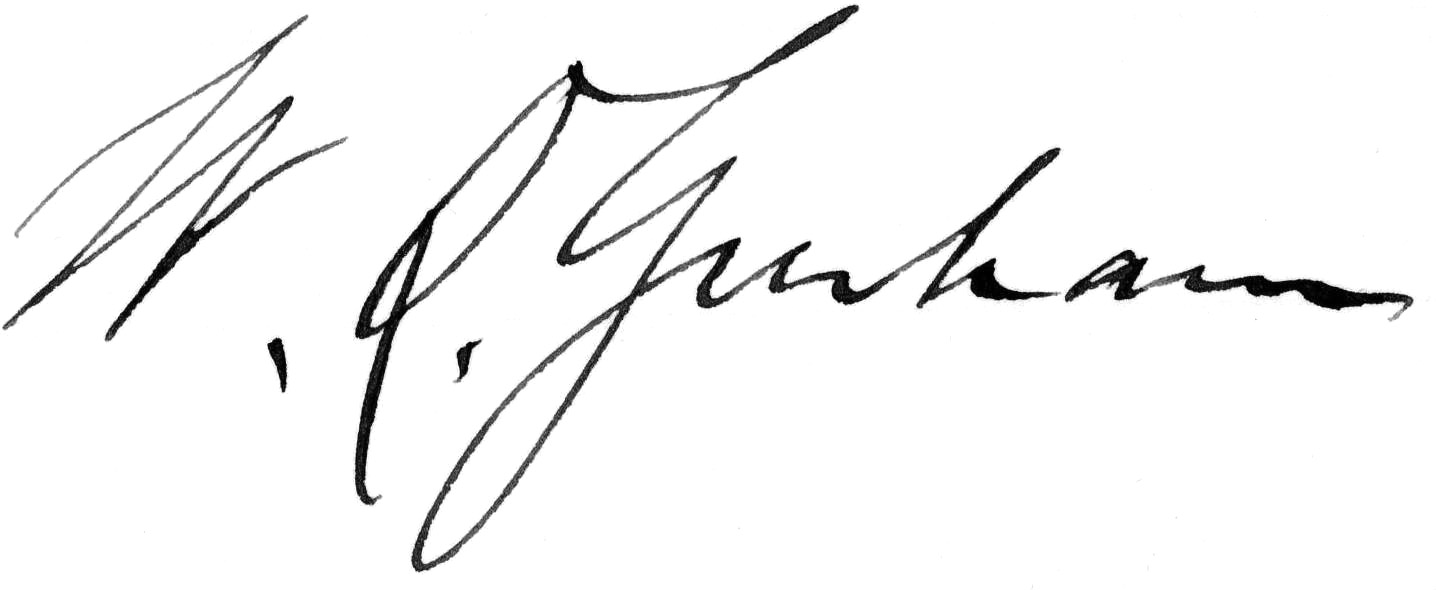
- Signature

Military service
- Branch/service: United States Army (Union Army)
- Years of service: 1861–1864
- Rank: Brigadier general
- Battles/wars: American Civil War

Walter Quintin Gresham (March 17, 1832 – May 28, 1895) was an American attorney, jurist, statesman, and politician who served in the cabinets of presidents Chester A. Arthur and Grover Cleveland.

Gresham was the 31st postmaster general of the United States under Arthur from 1883 to 1884 and briefly the 35th U.S. secretary of the treasury from September to October 1884 before resigning to become a federal judge. He was twice a candidate for the Republican nomination for U.S. president in 1884 and 1888 before leaving the party to support Cleveland in the 1892 election. He joined Cleveland's second cabinet as the 33rd U.S. secretary of state from 1893 until his death in 1895.

Gresham served as a federal judge on the U.S. Court of Appeals for the Seventh Circuit, the U.S. Circuit Courts for the Seventh Circuit, and the U.S. District Court for the District of Indiana.

== Early life and education ==
Walter Quintin Gresham was born on March 17, 1832, in Lanesville, Indiana, to William Gresham and Sarah Davis.

William Gresham was a former colonel in the Indiana militia, a cabinet maker, and a member of the Whig Party. He was elected sheriff of Harrison County, and on January 26, 1834, he was fatally stabbed while assisting in the arrest of Levi Sipes, a so-called "desperado". After William's death, Walter and his brothers were raised by a stepfather, Noah Remley. His grandmother's brother, Dennis Pennington, was also influential on his childhood. Pennington secured him a position in the office of the Harrison County auditor.

After attending the local schools in Harrison County, Gresham attended Corydon Seminary from 1849 to 1851. Montgomery Schuyler Jr. later attributed Greshman's foreign policy to his devout religiosity.

Gresham attended Indiana University Bloomington for a year beginning in September 1851, then returned to Corydon to read law with judge William A. Porter. He was admitted to the bar on April 1, 1854, and entered private practice with Thomas C. Slaughter.

Gresham quickly became involved in politics as an opponent of slavery, advocating for gradual, peaceful abolition. He ran unsuccessfully for Harrison County clerk in 1853. He joined the nativist American Party in 1855 before quickly joining the new Republican Party in 1856 and actively campaigning for the party's ticket. In 1860, he was elected to the Indiana House of Representatives as a Republican in a strongly Democratic district. Though Stephen A. Douglas carried Harrison County in the presidential election, Gresham won by sixty votes.

Gresham's first act in the House was to introduce a resolution declaring armed resistance to constitutional laws by Congress as treason; though the word "treason" was ultimately removed, Gresham's resolution passed. He was also a strong critic of the spoils system.

Gresham received a commission as a colonel on the staff of Oliver P. Morton, but their relationship was strained. As chair of the House Committee on Military Affairs, he was the author of a bill transferring power to commission militia officers to the governor; their office had previously been elected. Gresham asked Morton for such a commission but was refused.

== Civil War service ==
At the end of his term in the House, Gresham organized a military company at Corydon and enlisted as a private; he was elected captain but, following his friends' lobbying of Governor Morton, was quickly commissioned lieutenant colonel of the 38th Indiana Volunteer Infantry on September 18, 1861. In December, he was promoted to colonel and placed in command of the 53rd Indiana Volunteer Infantry, which subsequently took part in Ulysses S. Grant's Tennessee campaign of 1862, including the Sieges of Corinth and Vicksburg, during which Colonel Gresham commanded a brigade. On August 11, 1863, he was appointed brigadier general of volunteers and was placed in command of the Federal forces at Natchez, Mississippi.

In 1864, he commanded a division of the XVII Corps in William Tecumseh Sherman's Atlanta campaign, and before the Battle of Atlanta, on July 20, he received a gunshot wound to his knee that forced him to retire from active service and left him lame for life. In 1865, he was appointed a brevet major general of volunteers.

== Political and judicial career ==
In November 1865, Gresham returned to private practice in New Albany, Indiana in partnership with judge John Butler, but shortly began a solo practice. Though Gresham's popularity with his party declined over his opposition to black suffrage, he was nominated for United States House of Representatives in 1866. He was defeated by Michael C. Kerr. Instead, the legislature elected him to handle Indiana state finances in New York City.

While serving in that office, Gresham was a delegate to the 1868 Republican National Convention. He was nominated for House against Kerr again but was defeated by a larger margin.

=== Judge for the U.S. District Court of Indiana ===
On September 1, 1869, after declining appointments from President Grant as collector of the Port of New Orleans and U.S. attorney for the District of Indiana, Gresham received a recess appointment without consent to a seat on the U.S. District Court for the District of Indiana vacated by judge David McDonald; he accepted. He was nominated by President Grant on December 6, 1869, and confirmed by the U.S. Senate on December 21, 1869, the same day he received his commission.

Gresham's career as a district judge was marked by the Great Railroad Strike of 1877, during which he organized volunteer companies to preserve order and protect property. He repeatedly declined to run for public office, including governor of Indiana and the U.S. Senate.

=== Cabinet of Chester A. Arthur, Court of Appeals, and presidential campaigns ===
On April 9, 1883, Gresham resigned from the bench to accept an appointment as U.S. postmaster general in president Chester A. Arthur's cabinet. He supervised the reduction of the postal rate from three cents to two, the increase in the weight allowance from half an ounce to a full ounce, and the reduction in the cost of postage of mail to Canada. He also participated in the suppression of the Louisiana lottery by banning it from federal mails. He also oversaw reforms designed to improve the foreign postal service and restore faster mail delivery.

In September 1884, Arthur appointed Gresham to succeed Charles J. Folger, who died in office, as U.S. secretary of the treasury. After one month in office, he resigned to accept a recess appointment from President Arthur to a seat on the U.S. Circuit Court for the Seventh Circuit vacated by judge Thomas Drummond. He was nominated to the same position by President Arthur on December 3, 1884, was confirmed on December 9, and received his commission the same day. Gresham was assigned by operation of law to additional and concurrent service on the U.S. Court of Appeals for the Seventh Circuit on June 16, 1891, to a new seat authorized by the Evarts Act. He resigned on March 3, 1893.

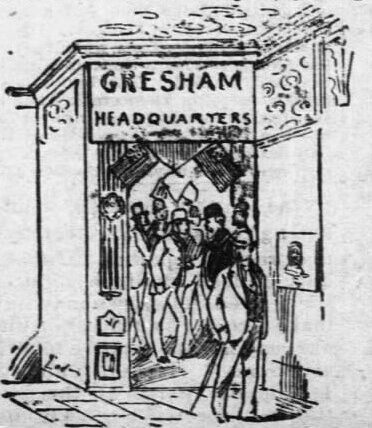
Illustration of the 1888 Republican National Convention headquarters of Gresham's presidential campaign

Gresham was a candidate for the 1884 and 1888 Republican presidential nominations. His 1888 candidacy was supported by several notable agrarian unions, including the Agricultural Wheel, the National Grange of the Order of Patrons of Husbandry, and the Farmers' Alliance. On the first ballot, Gresham finished second behind John Sherman and carried the states of Washington, Oregon, Minnesota, Illinois, Colorado, and Missouri. He did not, however, carry Indiana, which backed his rival Benjamin Harrison. On the eighth ballot, Harrison secured the nomination; he went on to defeat incumbent Democratic president Grover Cleveland in the general election.

Once in office, Harrison signed the McKinley Tariff. As a leading critic of protective tariffs and personal rival to Harrison, Gresham grew increasingly estranged from the Republican Party.

=== Secretary of State ===
In 1892, Gresham was offered the presidential nomination of the Populist Party, but declined and supported the Democratic candidate, Cleveland; privately, he emphasized that his support was due to Cleveland's position on the tariff and not his personal rivalry with Harrison.

On January 25, 1893, Cleveland offered Gresham the position of secretary of state. On the advice of his family, who suggested joining Cleveland's administration would appear to be a quid pro quo and risk his personal popularity, Gresham first declined the offer on February 3. On the advice of friends, especially Henry Watterson, and an urgent telegram from Cleveland to accept the offer, he reversed his position days later. Despite some opposition from Democratic Party regulars, the appointment was generally received with approval.

Gresham was Cleveland's secretary of state from 1893 to 1895. As secretary, Gresham led a moderate diplomatic application of the Monroe Doctrine in Central America and served as an international arbitrator between imperial powers in Central America and Asia. He negotiated the withdrawal of British troops during the Nicaragua Crisis of 1894–1895 and helped settle the Venezuelan crisis of 1895. He also served as an arbitrator in the First Sino-Japanese War and participated in the Bering Sea Arbitration. During the Hawaiian crisis following the 1893 Overthrow of Queen Liliʻuokalani, Gresham and President Grover Cleveland opposed the annexation of Hawaii. Cleveland's predecessor, Benjamin Harrison had supported annexation, however left office before any decisive action could be undertaken. When Cleveland came to power, he withdrew the annexation treaty from Senate, and attempted to restore the Queen.

Gresham died on May 28, 1895, in Washington, D.C. He is interred in Arlington National Cemetery.

== Personal life ==
Gresham married Matilda McGrain on March 11, 1858. They had two children, Kate and Otto.

One of Gresham's grandsons was U.S. representative Walter G. Andrews of New York.

== Legacy ==
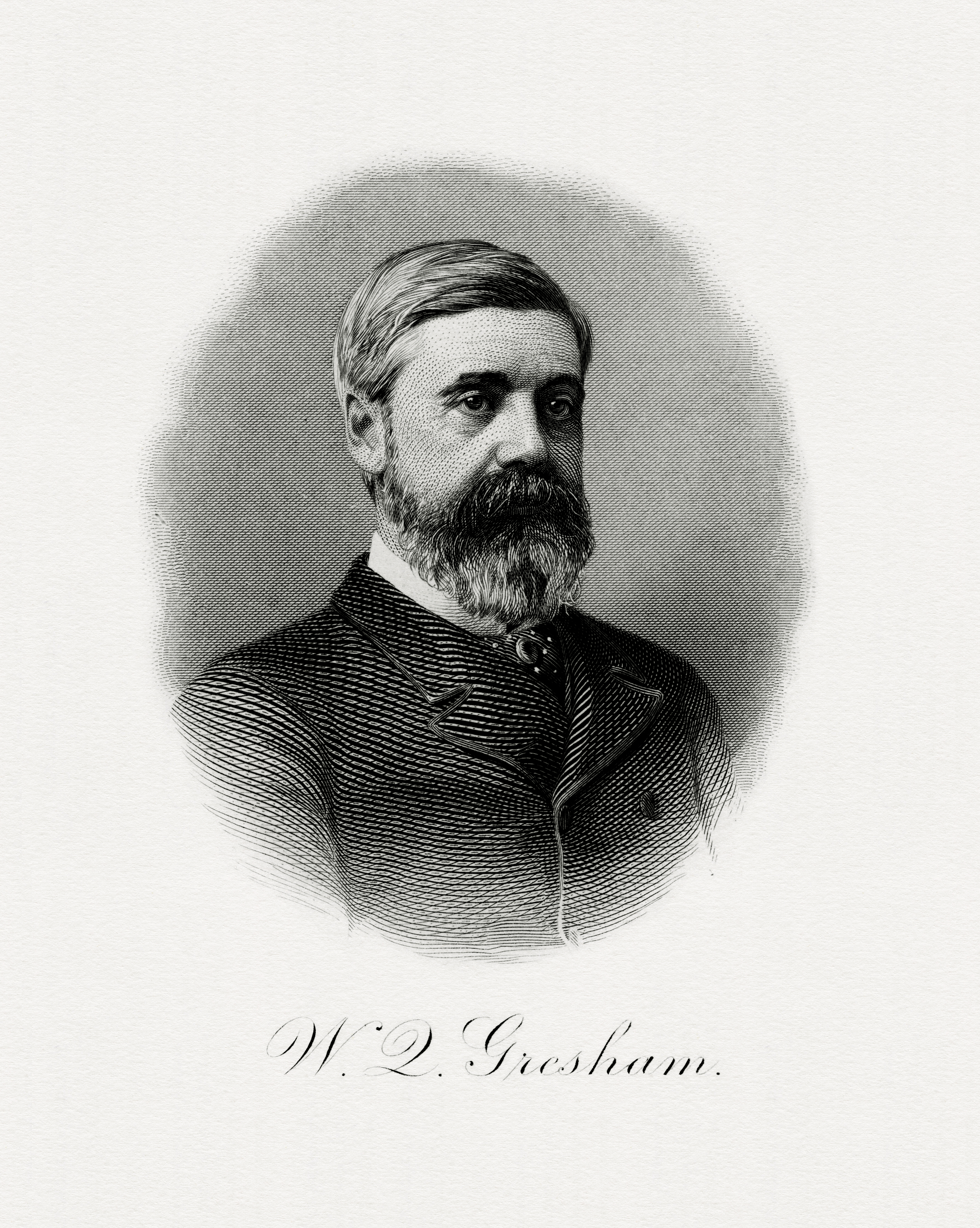
A portrait of Gresham by the Bureau of Engraving and Printing

Gresham received an honorary doctorate from Indiana University in 1883.

An 800-page biography of Gresham by his son and widow was published in 1919.

Gresham, Oregon; Gresham, Nebraska; Gresham, Wisconsin; and the ship USRC Gresham are named in his honor.

== See also ==
- List of American Civil War generals (Union)

== Bibliography ==
- Ford, Henry Jones (1921). The Cleveland Era: A Chronicle of the New Order in Politics. Yale University Press.
- Furer, Howard B., ed. (1970). James A. Garfield, 1831–1881. Oceana Publications.
- ——, ed. (1970). Chester A. Arthur, 1830–1880. Oceana Publications.
- Gresham, Matilda (1919). Life of Walter Quintin Gresham. Vol. I. Rand McNally & Company.
- Howe, George Frederick (1957). Chester A. Arthur: A Quarter Century of Machine Politics. F. Ungar Publishing Company.
- Perry, Henry Fales (1906). History of the Thirty-Eighth Regiment Indiana Volunteer Infantry. F.A. Stuart.
- Schuyler, Montgomery Jr. (1928). "Walter Quintin Gresham". In Bemis, Samuel Flagg (ed.). The American Secretaries of State and Their Diplomacy. Vol. VII. Alfred A. Knopf.
- Sedgwick, Theron E. (1921). York County, Nebraska and Its People: Together with a Condensed History of the State. Vol. I. S. J. Clarke Publishing Company.
- Vexler, Robert I., ed. (1968). Grover Cleveland, 1837–1908. Oceana Publications.
- Vexler, Robert I. (1975). The Vice-Presidents and Cabinet Members: Biographies Arranged Chronologically by Administration. Vol. I. Oceana Publications.

Legal offices
Preceded by David McDonald	Judge of the United States District Court for the District of Indiana; 1869–1883	Succeeded by William Allen Woods
Preceded by Thomas Drummond	Judge of the United States Circuit Courts for the Seventh Circuit; 1884–1893	Succeeded by James Graham Jenkins
Preceded by Seat established by 26 Stat. 826	Judge of the United States Court of Appeals for the Seventh Circuit; 1891–1893	Succeeded by James Graham Jenkins
Political offices
Preceded by Timothy O. Howe	United States Postmaster General; 1883–1884	Succeeded by Frank Hatton
Preceded by Charles J. Folger	United States Secretary of the Treasury; 1884	Succeeded by Hugh McCulloch
Preceded by John W. Foster	United States Secretary of State; 1893–1895	Succeeded by Richard Olney
