= David McDonald (judge) =

American judge (1803–1869)

Judge of the United States District Court for the District of Indiana
- In office December 13, 1864 – August 25, 1869
- Appointed by: Abraham Lincoln
- Preceded by: Albert Smith White
- Succeeded by: Walter Q. Gresham

Personal details
- Born: David McDonald; May 8, 1803 Millersburg, Kentucky
- Died: August 25, 1869 (aged 66) Indianapolis, Indiana
- Resting place: Crown Hill Cemetery and Arboretum, Section 3, Lot 37
- Education: read law

David McDonald (May 8, 1803 – August 25, 1869) was a United States district judge of the United States District Court for the District of Indiana.

== Education and career ==
Born in Millersburg, Kentucky, McDonald read law to enter the bar in 1830, and entered private practice in Washington, Indiana. He was a member of the Indiana House of Representatives from 1833 to 1834, and a prosecuting attorney of the 7th Judicial Circuit of Indiana from 1834 to 1837, thereafter returning to private practice until 1839. He was a Judge of the 10th Judicial Circuit of Indiana from 1839 to 1852, also serving as a professor of law at Indiana University Bloomington from 1842 to 1852. He was again in private practice, this time in Indianapolis, Indiana from 1853 to 1864.

== Federal judicial service ==
On December 12, 1864, McDonald was nominated by President Abraham Lincoln to a seat on the United States District Court for the District of Indiana vacated by Judge Albert Smith White. McDonald was confirmed by the United States Senate on December 13, 1864, and received his commission the same day, serving thereafter until his death on August 25, 1869, in Indianapolis.

== Death ==
David McDonald died in Indianapolis, Indiana, on August 25, 1869, at the age of sixty-six. His remains are interred at Crown Hill Cemetery in Indianapolis in Section 3, Lot 37.

== Sources ==
Legal offices
Preceded by Albert Smith White	Judge of the United States District Court for the District of Indiana; 1864–1869	Succeeded by Walter Q. Gresham
