= Edward A. Hannegan =

American politician (1807–1859)

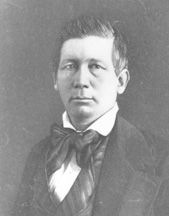

United States Senator from Indiana
- In office March 4, 1843 – March 3, 1849
- Preceded by: Oliver H. Smith
- Succeeded by: James Whitcomb

Member of the U. S. House of Representatives from Indiana's 7th district
- In office March 4, 1833 – March 3, 1837
- Preceded by: District created
- Succeeded by: Albert S. White

Indiana House of Representatives
- In office 1832–1833
- In office 1841–1842

Personal details
- Born: Edward Allen Hannegan; June 25, 1807 Hamilton County, Ohio, U.S.
- Died: February 25, 1859 (aged 51) St. Louis, Missouri, U.S.
- Resting place: Woodlawn Cemetery, Terre Haute, Indiana
- Party: Democratic-Republican; Democrat
- Spouse: Mary Chambers Duncan
- Profession: Lawyer; Schoolteacher

Edward Allen Hannegan (June 25, 1807 – February 25, 1859) was an American lawyer and politician from Indiana, serving two terms as a United States representative from 1833 to 1837, and one term as a U.S. Senator from 1843 to 1849.

== Early life and education ==
Born in Hamilton County, Ohio, he moved with his parents to Bourbon County, Kentucky, the same year. He attended the public schools, studied law at Transylvania University, taught school, and worked as a farm hand. Hannegan moved to Fountain County, Indiana, about 1825 where he worked as a farm hand and as a school teacher. He was admitted to the bar in April 1828 in Fountain County. Moving the following year, he was admitted to practice law in Warren County, Indiana, on May 27, 1829, settling in Williamsport. A few months later, he moved to Covington, where he continued the practice of law. At some unknown time, Hannegan became a Freemason. On April 4, 1829, he married Margaret Chambers Duncan in Knox County, Indiana; they had one son, Sellman Key Hannegan, born January 20, 1832.

== Politics and foreign service ==
Hannegan was a member of the Indiana House of Representatives from 1832 to 1833 and from 1841 to 1842.

=== Congress ===
He was elected as a Democrat to the Twenty-third and Twenty-fourth Congresses, serving from March 4, 1833 – March 4, 1837. Hannegan was not a candidate for renomination in 1836 and resumed the practice of law; he was elected as a Democrat to the U.S. Senate in 1842 and served from March 4, 1843, to March 4, 1849. He was an unsuccessful candidate for renomination in 1849, losing to Governor James Whitcomb.

While in the Senate, he was chairman of the Committee on Private Land Claims (Twenty-ninth Congress) and a member of the Committee on Roads and Canals (Twenty-ninth and Thirtieth Congresses) and the Committee on Foreign Relations (Thirtieth Congress).

=== Diplomat ===
He was appointed by President James K. Polk United States Minister to Prussia March 29, 1849, and served 1849–1850. The Queen consort of King Frederick William IV became infatuated with Hannegan. During a court function, Hannegan broke custom and kissed the hand of the queen. Irate and possibly jealous, King Frederick Wilhelm IV requested that Hannegan be recalled.

Upon his return to the United States, Hannegan resumed his law practice in Covington.

== Military service ==
On August 5, 1838, Hannegan received a commission as a colonel in the Indiana militia. He was stationed at Fort Plymouth due to conflict with the local Potawatomi who were being forced to leave Indiana for Osawatomie in the Kansas Territory. This event became known as the Trail of Death because more than 40 of the 850 tribal members died on the march.

== Murder case ==
Hannegan was an alcoholic from a young age. On the night of May 6, 1852, his brother-in-law, Captain John R. Duncan, who had served honorably in the Mexican–American War and with whom he and his wife lived, confronted Hannegan about his heavy drinking out of concern for Hannegan's political future. Hannegan's wife took him by the arm and attempted to take him upstairs away from the argument. Hannegan grabbed a nearby cane dagger and mortally wounded Duncan by stabbing him in the neck to the hilt of the dagger. Duncan died the following day, declaring that no blame should be placed on Hannegan.

Hannegan was arrested and charged with manslaughter. At the time, Lew Wallace was the prosecuting attorney for Covington; he was also a close friend of Hannegan. Because Wallace's prosecution was so weak and Hannegan was permitted to present his case (an unusual practice), the grand jury refused to indict Hannegan. Wallace was heavily criticized by the community for his prosecution and forced to resign and move to Crawfordsville. Daniel W. Voorhees was then appointed to replace Wallace. Despite the evidence, Voorhees decided not present the case to the grand jury, and he too was forced to leave Covington. The case was dismissed by Judge Isaac Naylor, September 18, 1852.

== Later life and death ==
Hannegan continued to practice law in Covington until 1857 when he moved to St. Louis, Missouri, where his son was already living. He practiced law there for two years and was preparing to reenter politics. Hannegan's wife preceded him in death and he continued drinking and developed a morphine habit. He was the keynote speaker at a political rally on February 24, 1859, promoting the candidacy of Stephen A. Douglas for president. Hannegan was intoxicated and under the influence of morphine when he delivered the address, which was poorly received. Derided and ridiculed for his performance, Hannegan returned to his room where he overdosed on morphine, his body being discovered the following day. Interment was in Woodlawn Cemetery, Terre Haute, Indiana.

== Notes ==
U.S. House of Representatives
Preceded by New district	Member of the U.S. House of Representatives from Indiana's 7th congressional district March 4, 1833 – March 4, 1837	Succeeded by Albert S. White
U.S. Senate
Preceded by Oliver H. Smith	U.S. senator (Class 3) from Indiana; March 4, 1843 – March 4, 1849; Served alongside: Albert S. White, Jesse D. Bright	Succeeded by James Whitcomb
Diplomatic posts
Preceded by Andrew Jackson Donelson	United States Ambassador to Germany; June 30, 1849 – January 13, 1850	Succeeded by Daniel D. Barnard
