= 1888 Republican National Convention =

American political convention

- 1888 presidential election
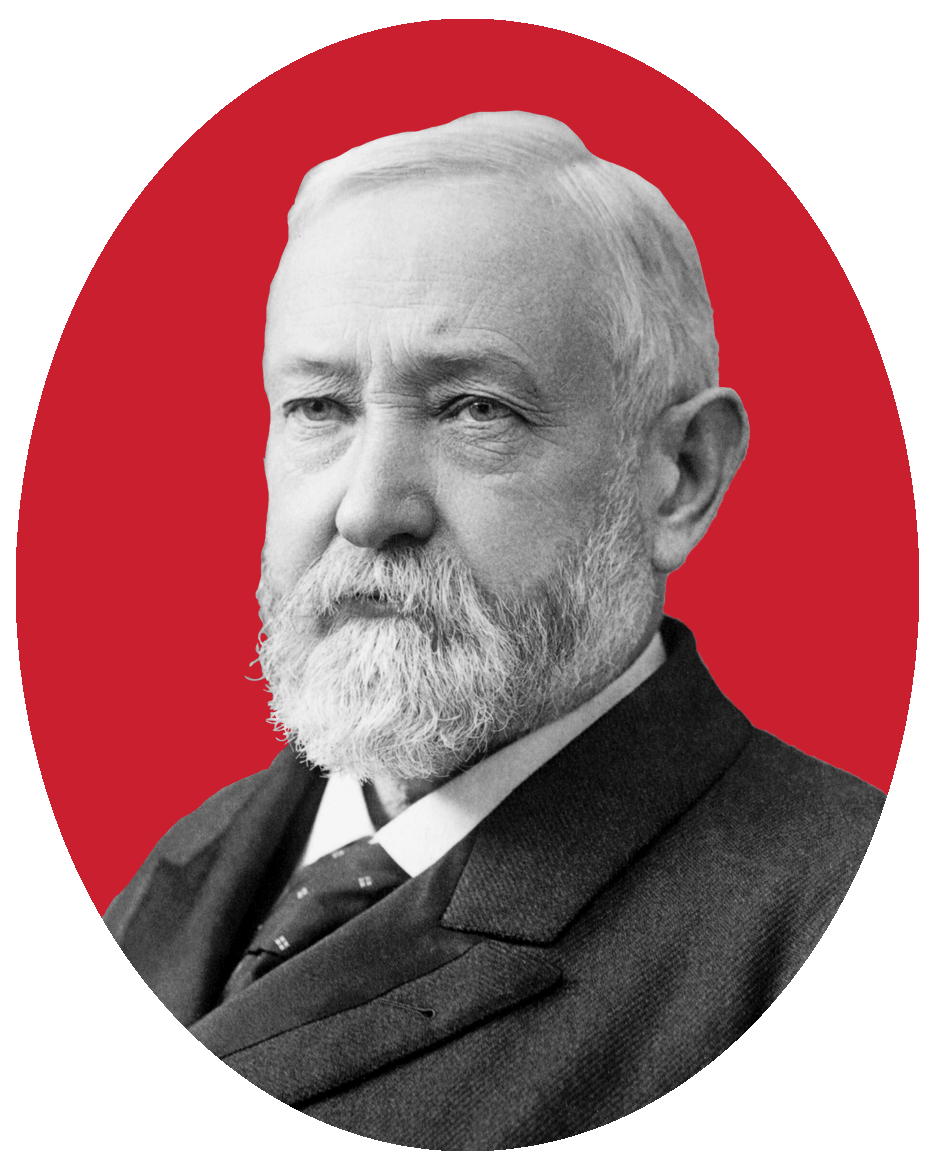
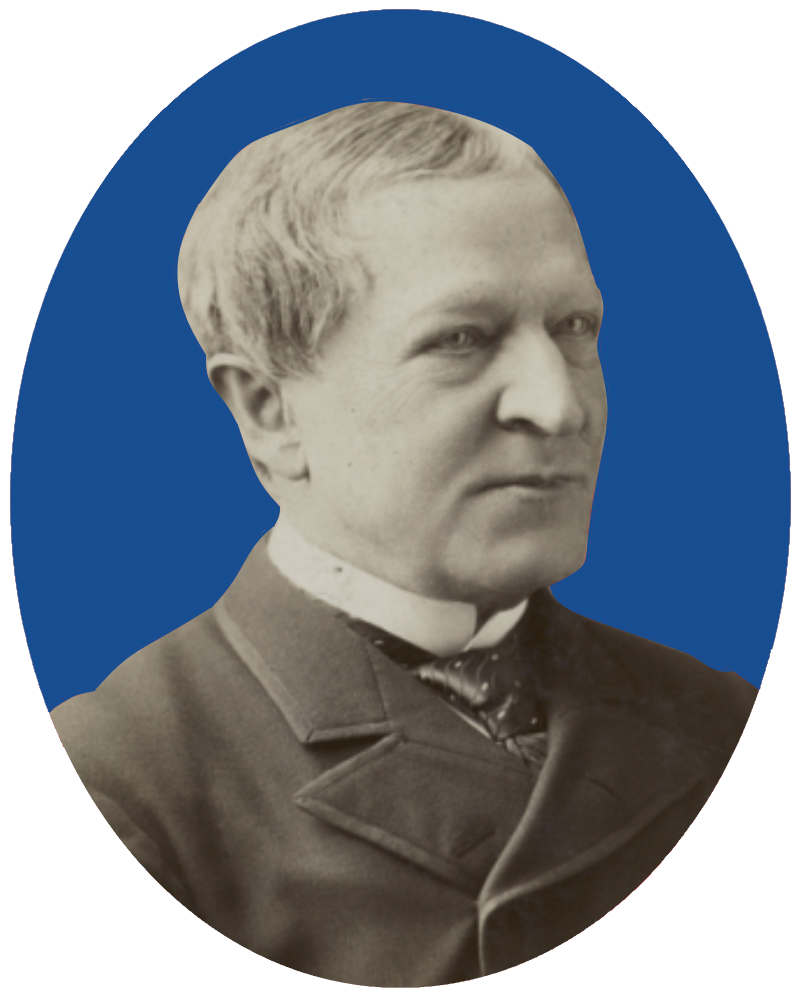
- Nominees; Harrison and Morton

Convention
- Date(s): June 19–25, 1888
- City: Chicago, Illinois
- Venue: Auditorium Theatre
- Chair: Morris M. Estee

Candidates
- Presidential nominee: Benjamin Harrison of Indiana
- Vice-presidential nominee: Levi P. Morton of New York
- Other candidates: John Sherman; Russell A. Alger; Walter Q. Gresham

Voting
- Total delegates: 832
- Votes needed for nomination: 417
- Results (president): Harrison (IN): 544 (65.38%); Sherman (OH): 118 (14.18%); Alger (MI): 100 (12.02%); Gresham (IN): 59 (7.09%); Blaine (ME): 5 (0.60%); McKinley (OH): 4 (0.48%); Others: 1 (0.12%)
- Results (vice president): Morton (NY): 592 (71.15%); Phelps (NJ): 119 (14.3%); Bradley (KY): 103 (12.38%); Bruce (MS): 11 (1.32%); Abstaining: 6 (0.72%); Walter S. Thomas: 1 (0.12%)
- Ballots: 8

The 1888 Republican National Convention was a presidential nominating convention held at the Auditorium Theatre in Chicago, Illinois, on June 19–25, 1888. It resulted in the nomination of former Senator Benjamin Harrison of Indiana for president and Levi P. Morton of New York, a former Representative and Minister to France, for vice president. During the convention, Frederick Douglass was invited to speak and became the first African-American to have his name put forward for a presidential nomination in a major party's roll call vote; he received one vote from Kentucky on the fourth ballot.

The ticket won in the election of 1888, defeating President Grover Cleveland and former Senator Allen G. Thurman from Ohio.

== Venue ==
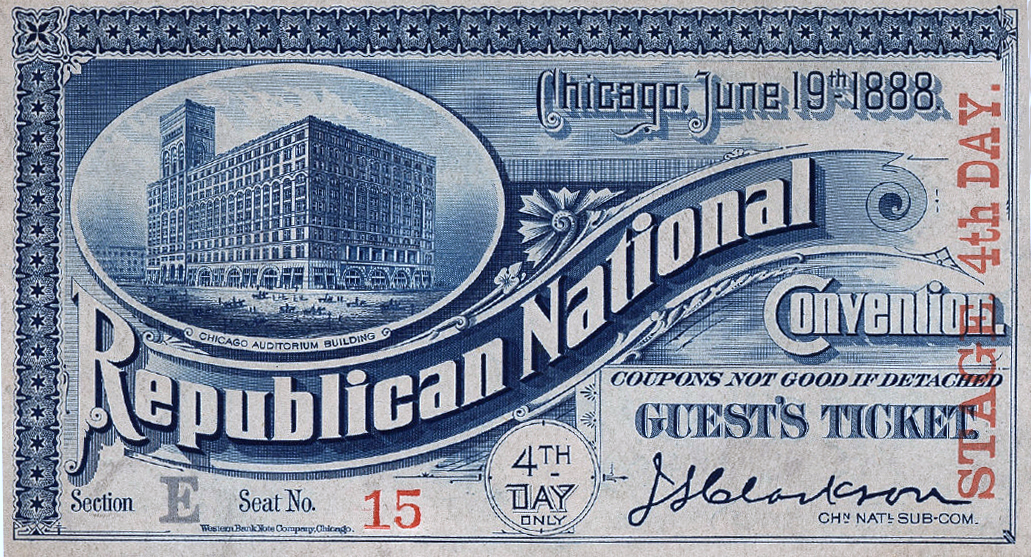
Entrance ticket, featuring a rendering of the design for the then-under-construction Auditorium Building (which housed the Auditorium Theatre, the main venue of the convention)

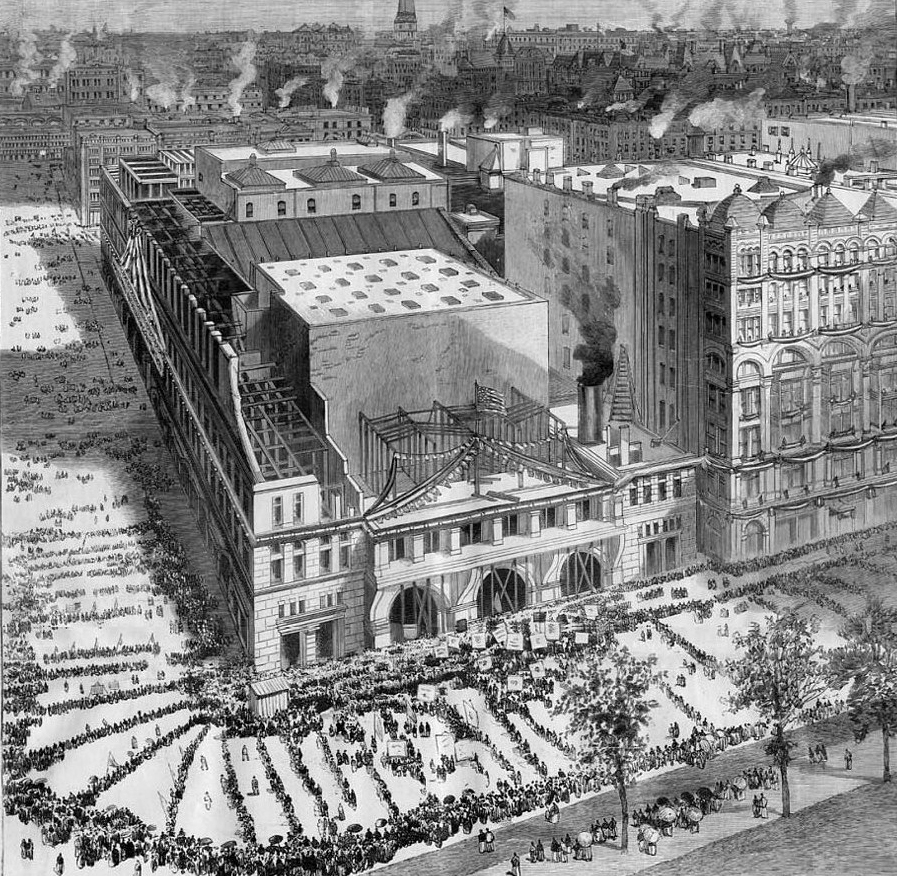
Illustration of the exterior of the then-incomplete Auditorium Building during the convention

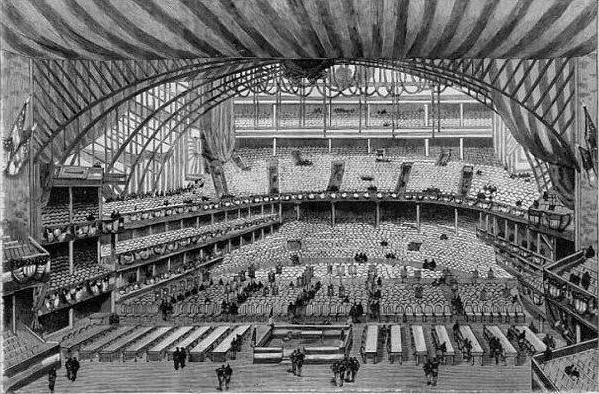
Illustration of the Auditorium Theatre during the convention

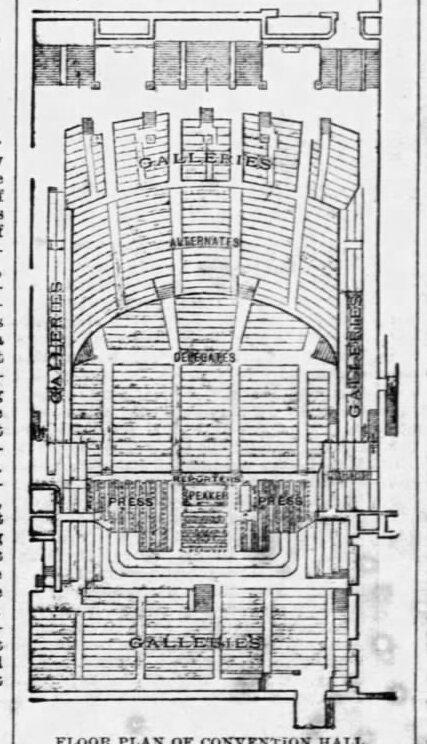
Floor plan of the venue as set-up during the convention

The convention was held in Chicago's Auditorium Theatre. Since construction had not been completed, a tent canvas was utilized as a temporary roof. Labor movement supporters took issue with the non-trade union labor used in construction of the theater's Auditorium Building. The potential controversy was resolved when Republicans adopted a platform that included increasing manufacturing jobs through higher tariffs to stimulate domestic manufacturing, a ban on foreign contract laborers, and improvement to harbors and waterways to increase employment by making it easier to transport raw materials and manufactured goods.

== Issues addressed ==
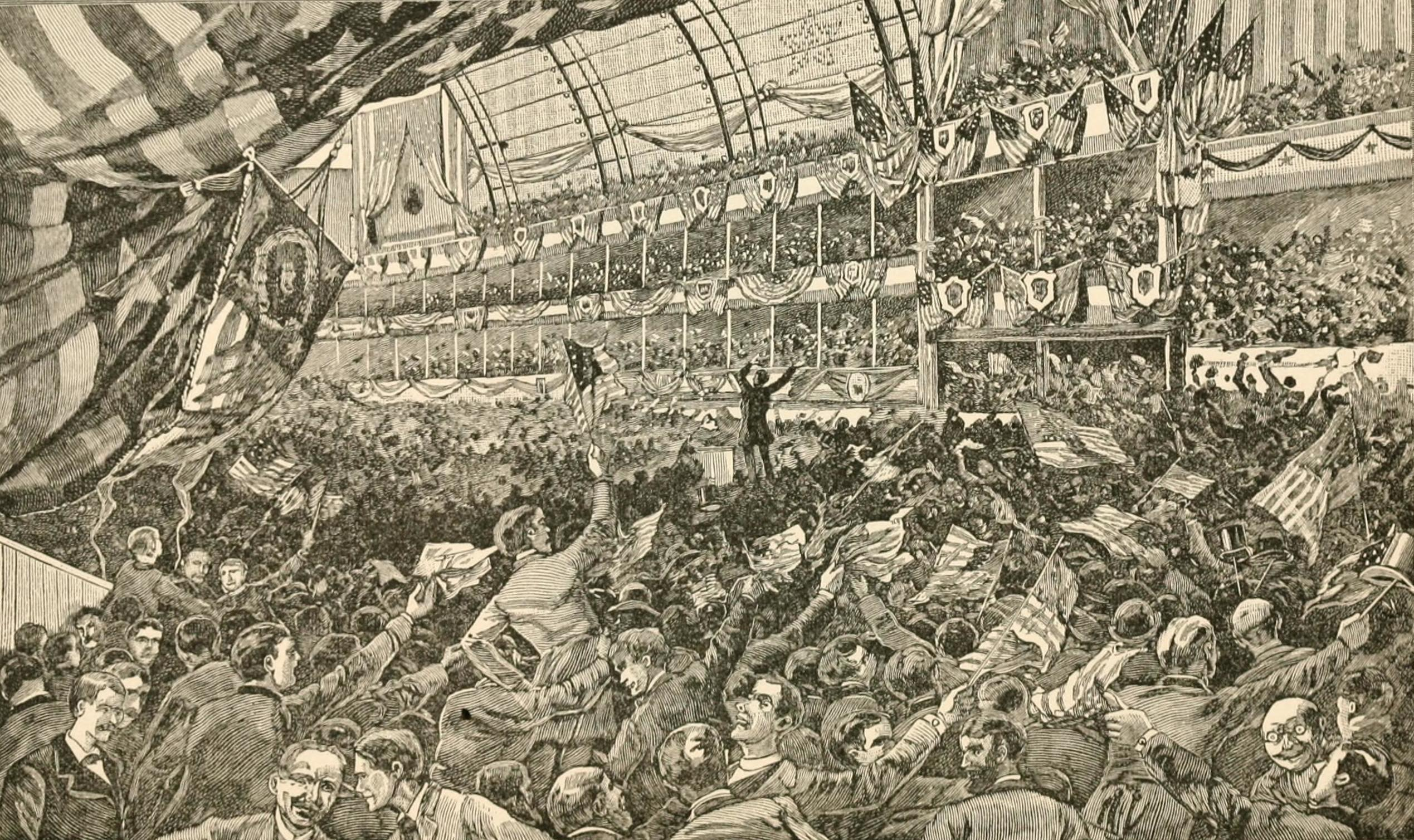
Illustration of the convention

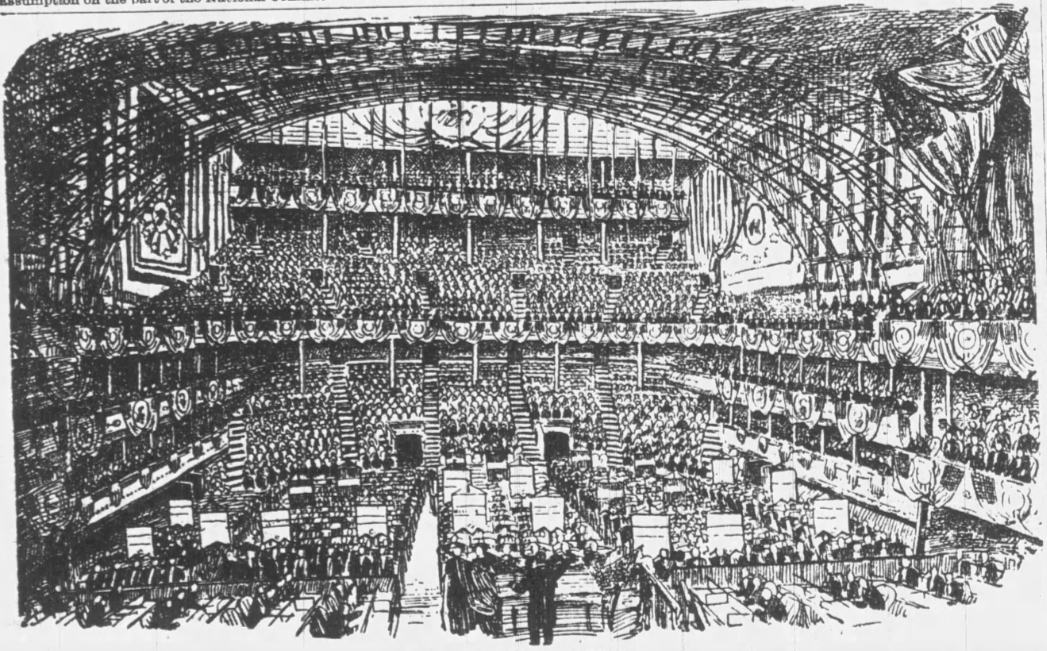
Illustration of the convention

In addition to support for higher tariffs, issues addressed at the convention included repeal of taxes on tobacco, support for the use of gold and silver as currency, and support for pensions for veterans. The party also expressed its opposition to polygamy.

== Presidential nomination ==
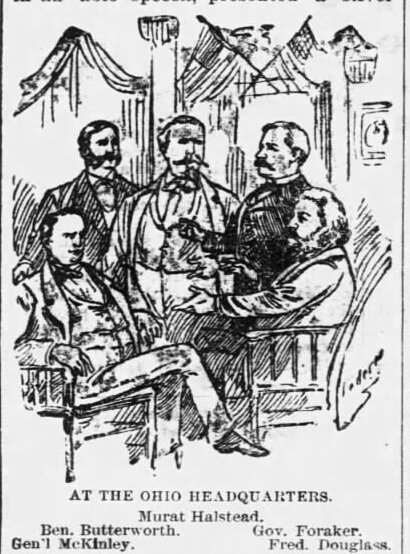
Illustration depicting a meeting at the Ohio delegation's convention headquarters featuring Murat Halstead, Benjamin Butterworth, William McKinley, Joseph B. Foraker, and Frederick Douglass

=== Nominated ===
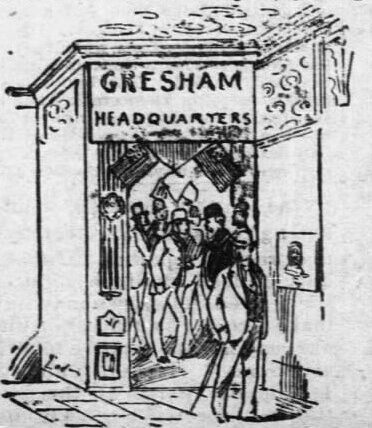
Illustration of the Gresham campaign's convention headquarters

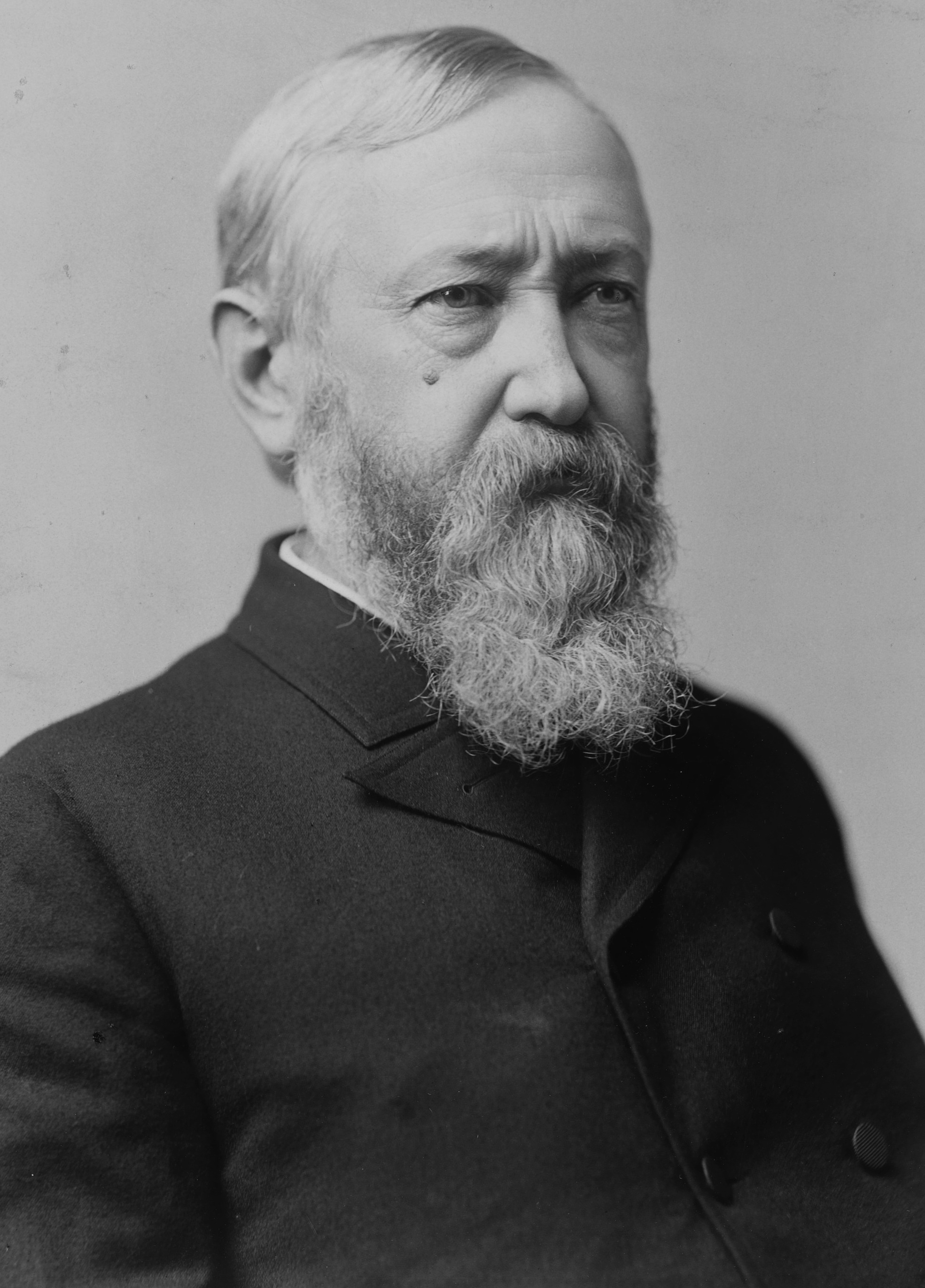
Former U.S. Senator
Benjamin Harrison
of Indiana

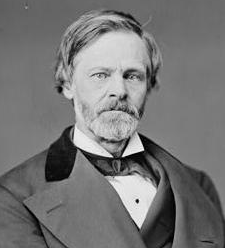
U.S. Senator
John Sherman
of Ohio

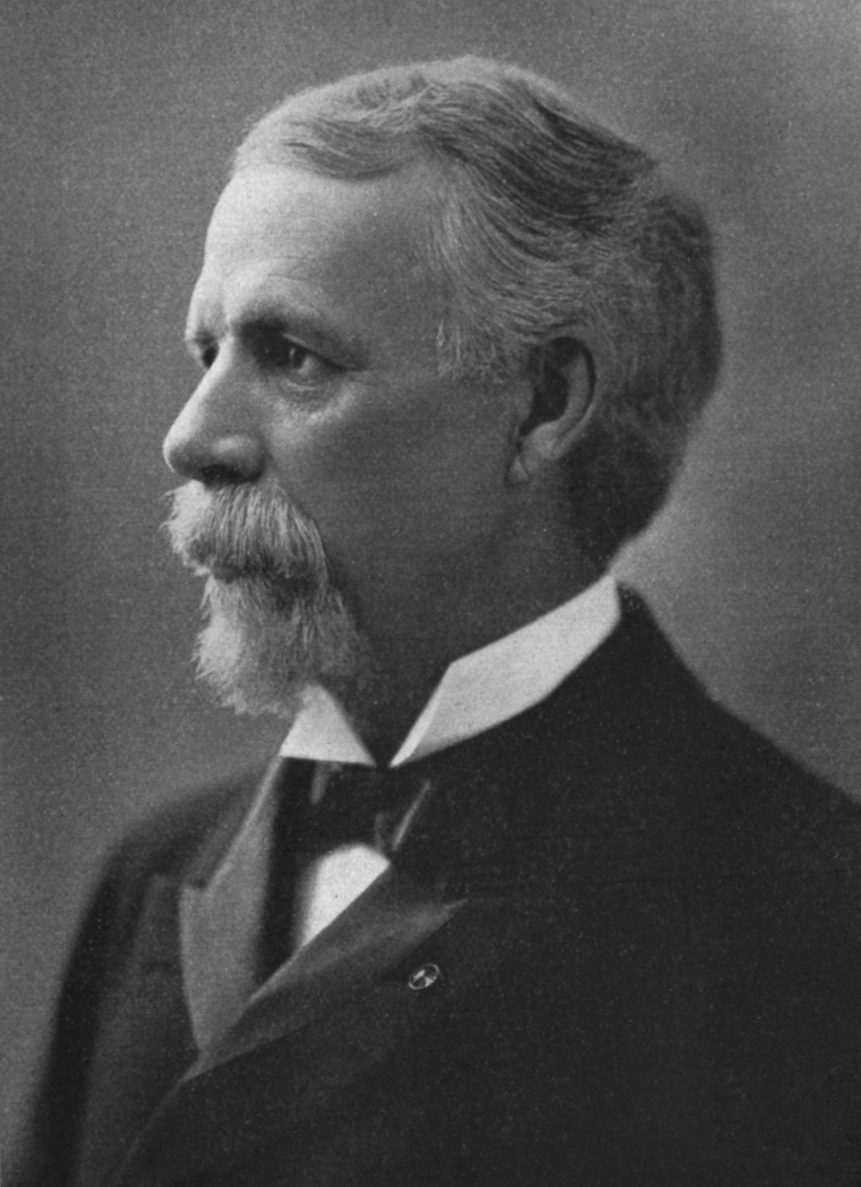
Former Governor
Russell A. Alger
of Michigan

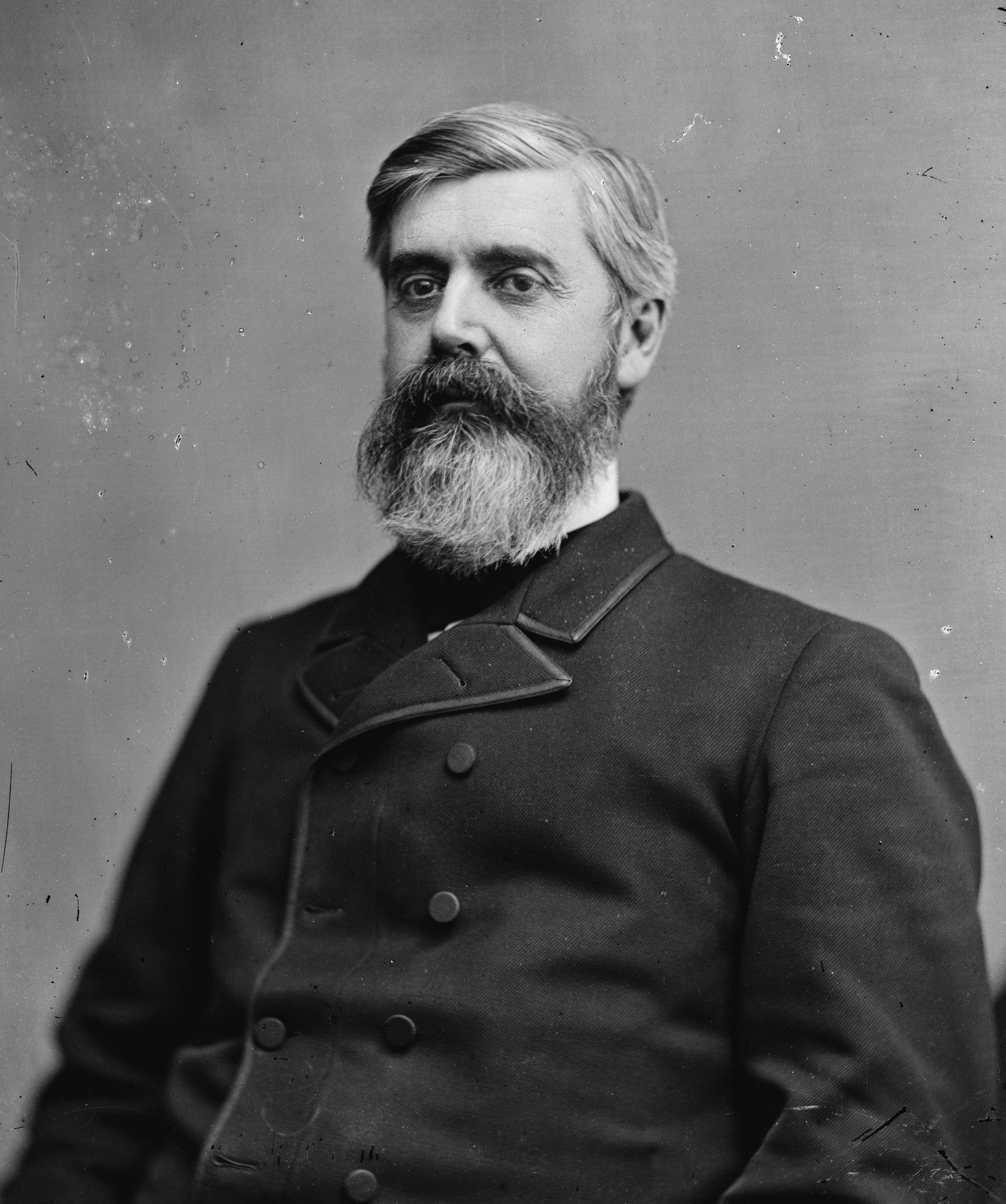
Former Secretary of the Treasury
Walter Q. Gresham
of Indiana

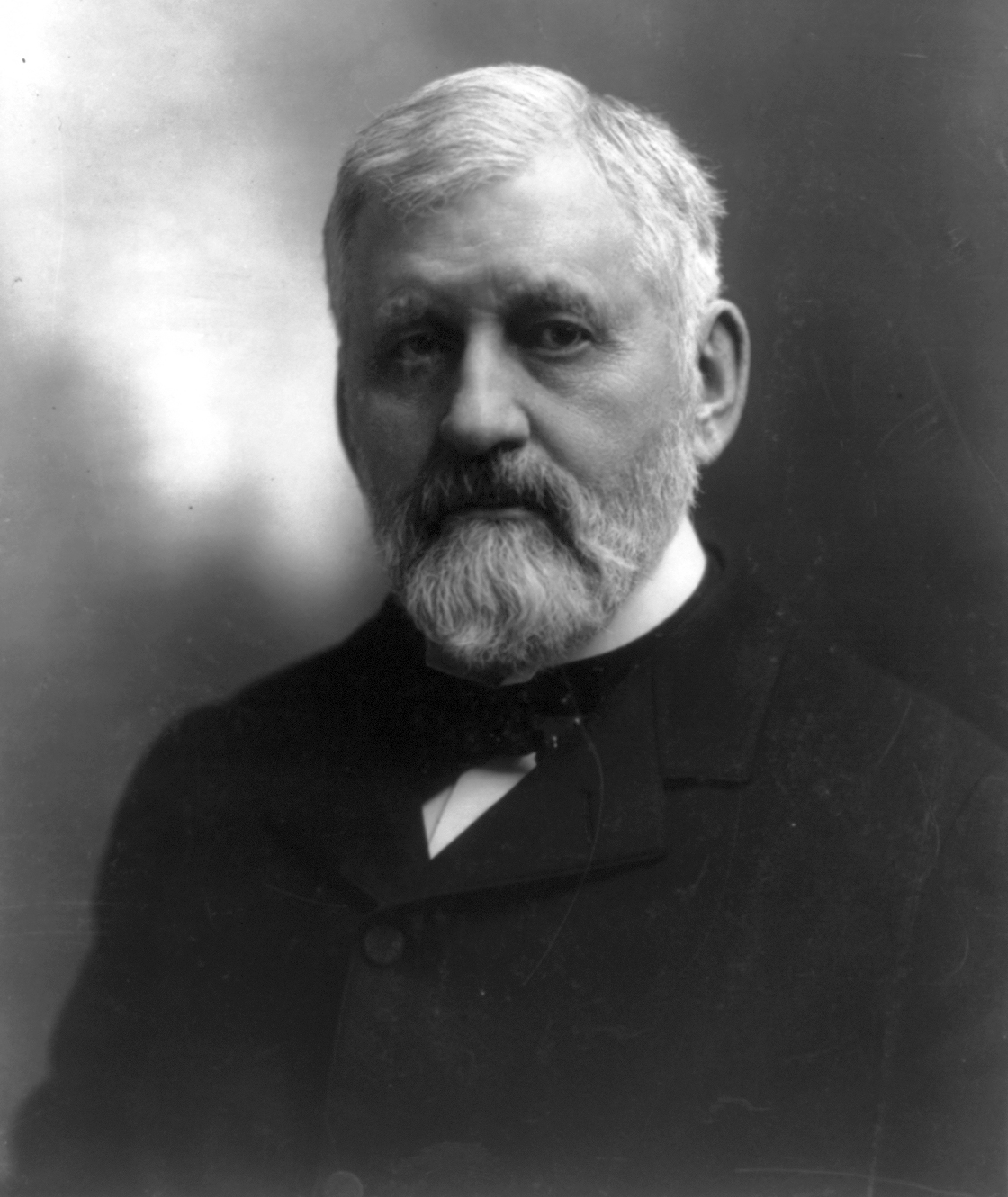
U.S. Senator
William B. Allison
of Iowa
(Withdrew after 7th Ballot)

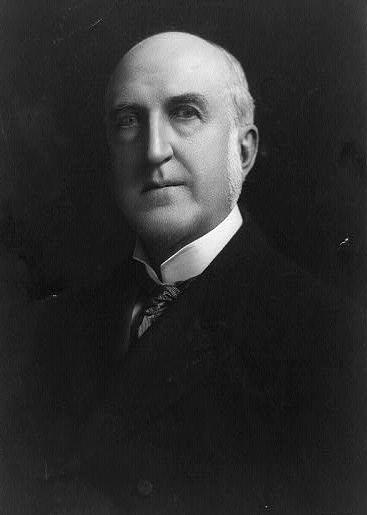
NYC RR President
Chauncey Depew
of New York
(Withdrew after 3rd Ballot)

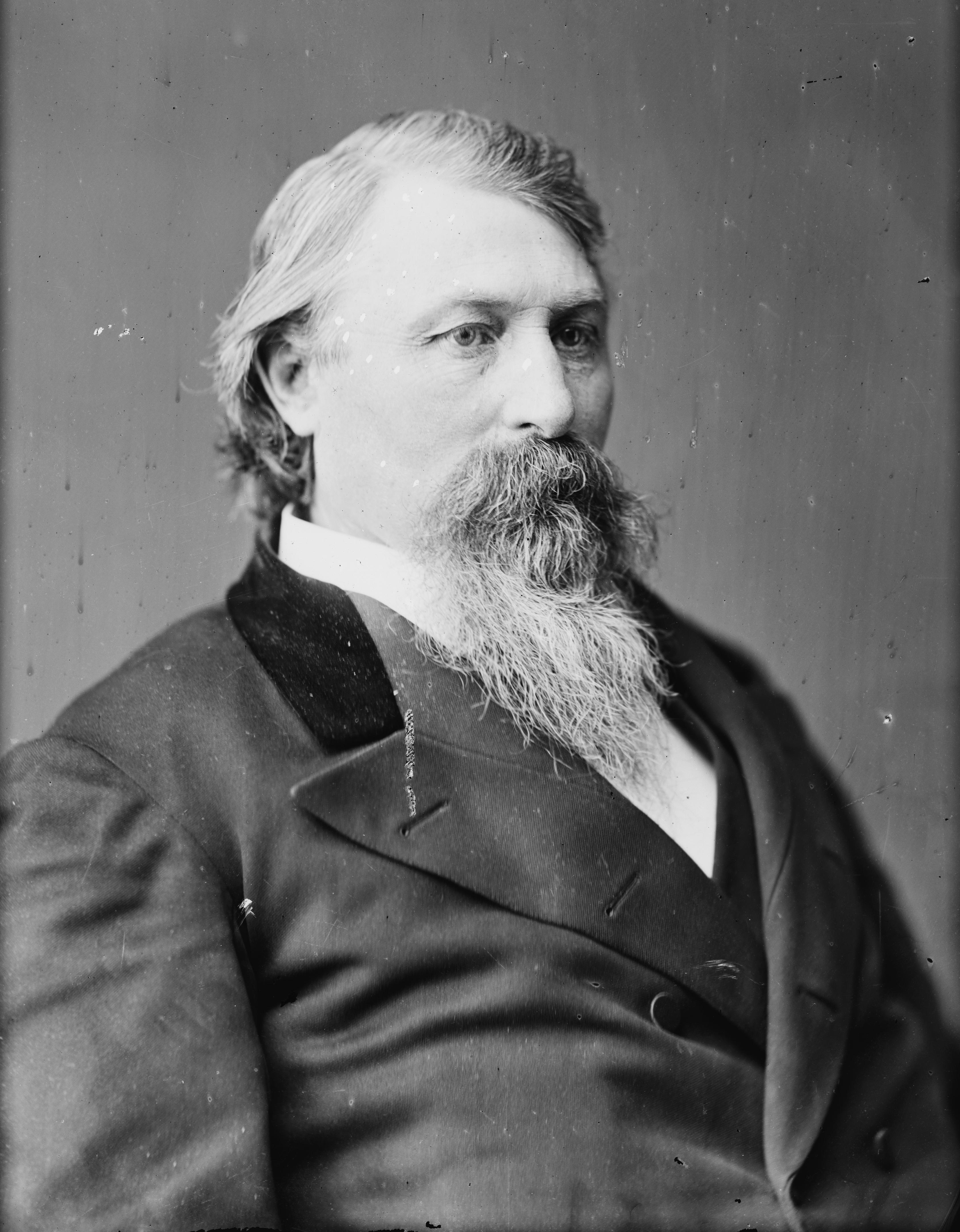
Governor
Jeremiah M. Rusk
of Wisconsin
(Withdrew after 3rd Ballot)

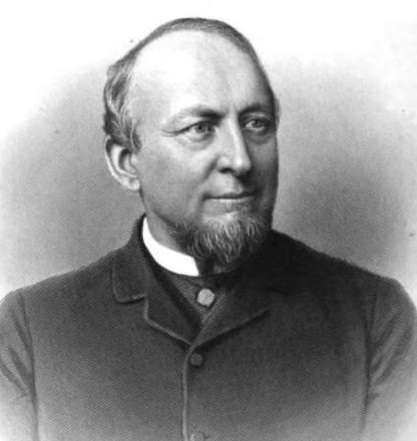
Mayor
Edwin Henry Fitler
of Pennsylvania
(Withdrew after 1st Ballot)

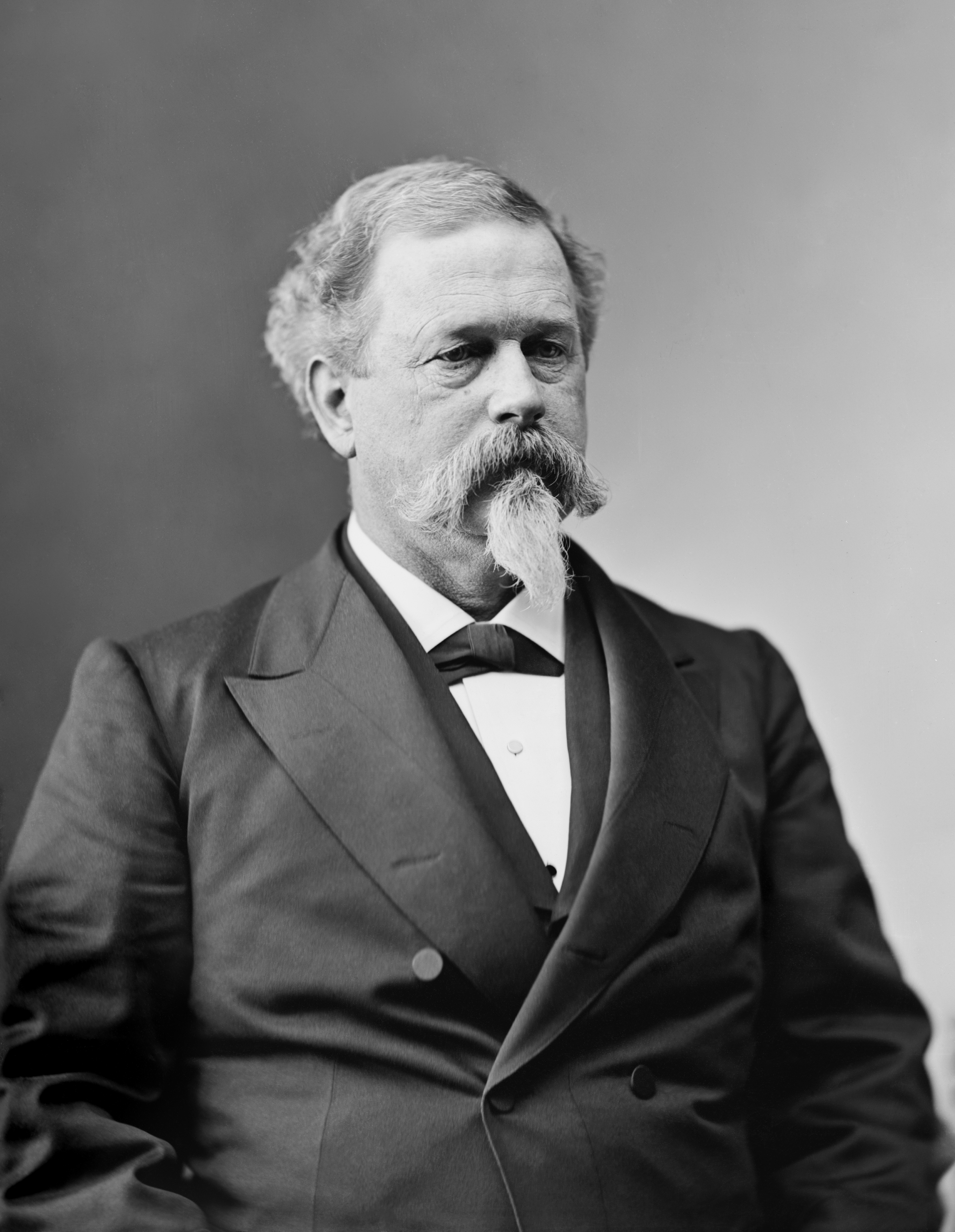
Senator
Joseph R. Hawley
from Connecticut
(Withdrew after 1st Ballot)

=== Not Nominated ===
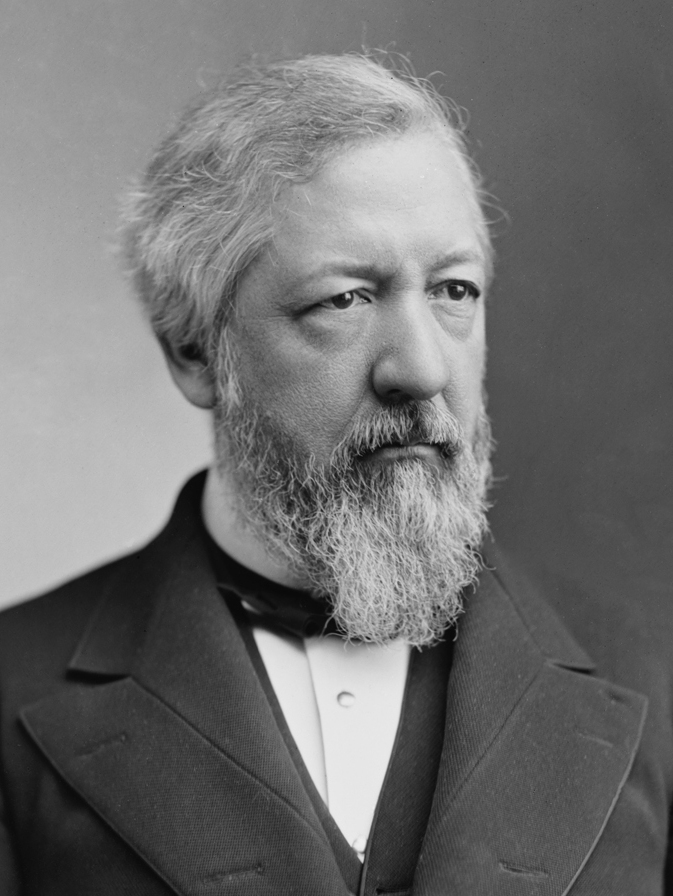
Former Secretary of State
James G. Blaine
of Maine
(Declined to Contest)
(Recommended Harrison)

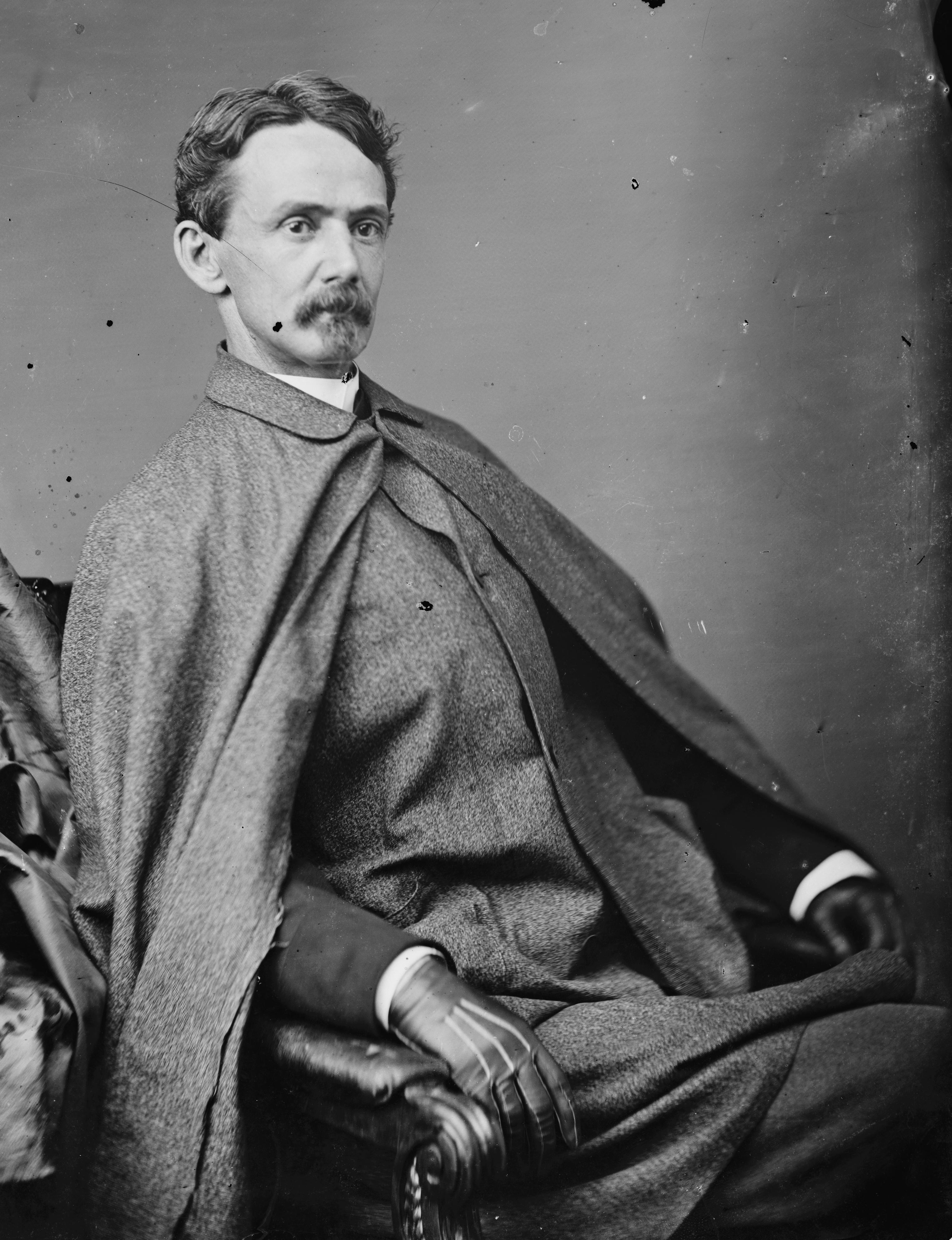
U.S. Senator
John J. Ingalls
of Kansas

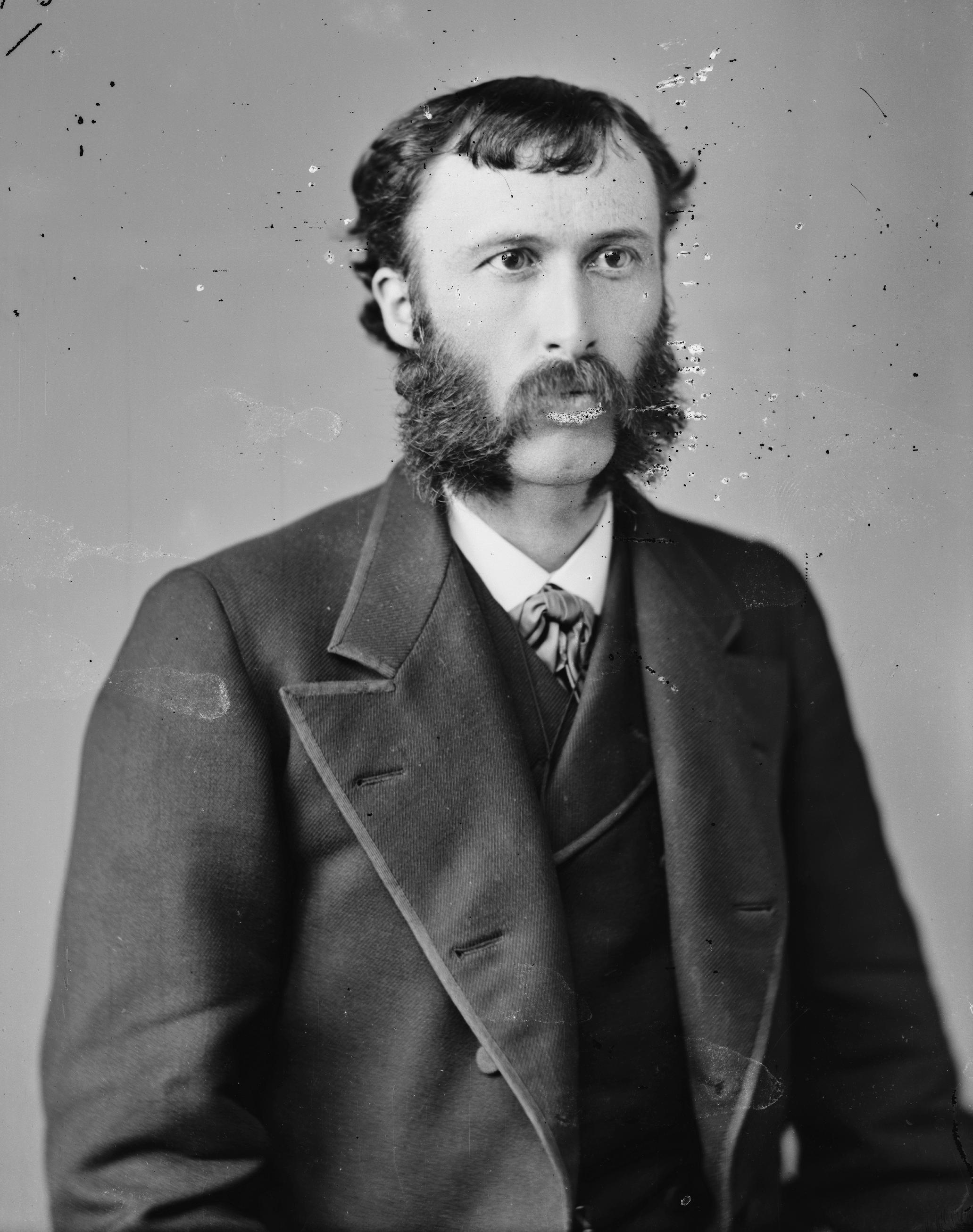
Representative
William Walter Phelps
of New Jersey

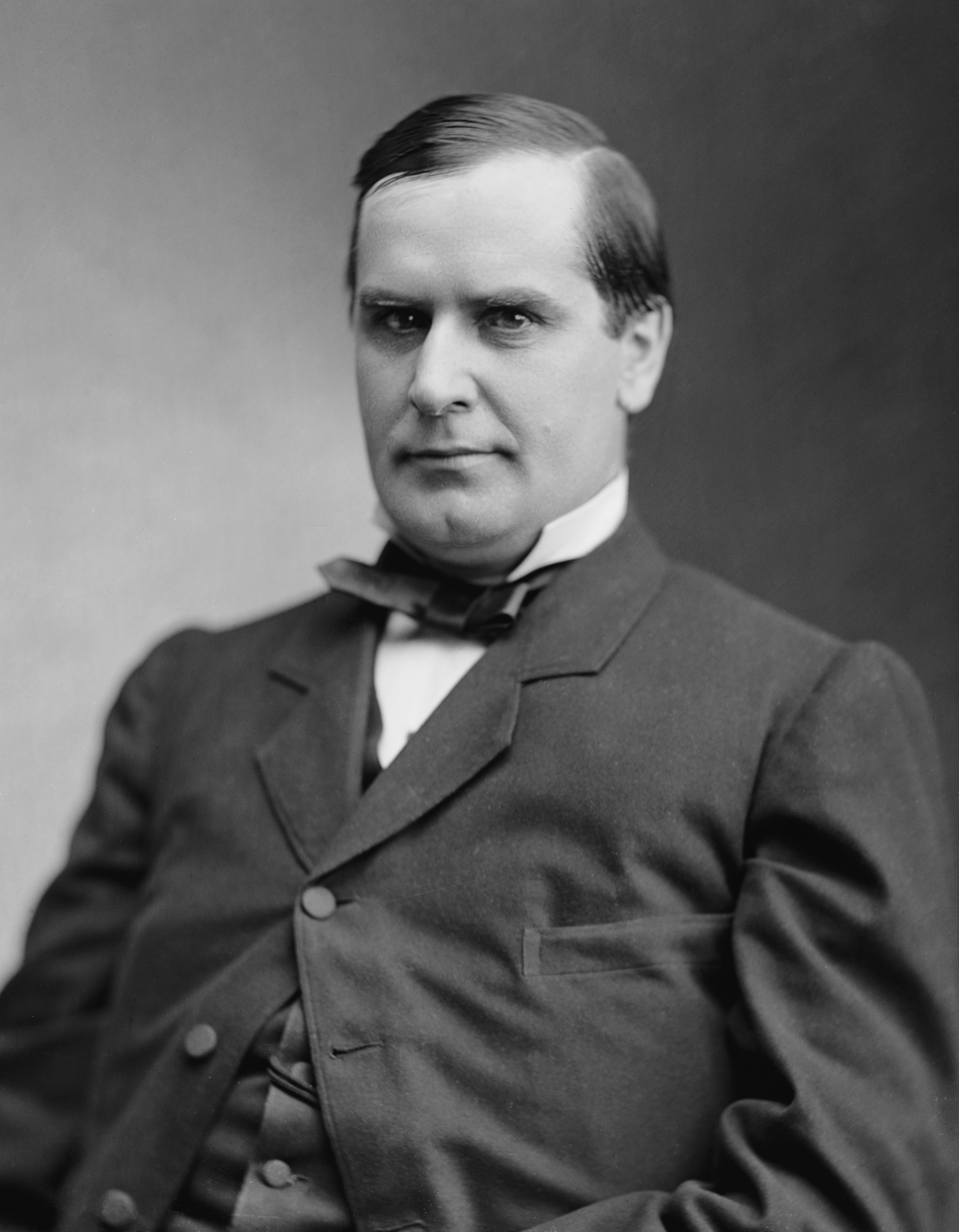
Representative
William McKinley
of Ohio
(Endorsed John Sherman)

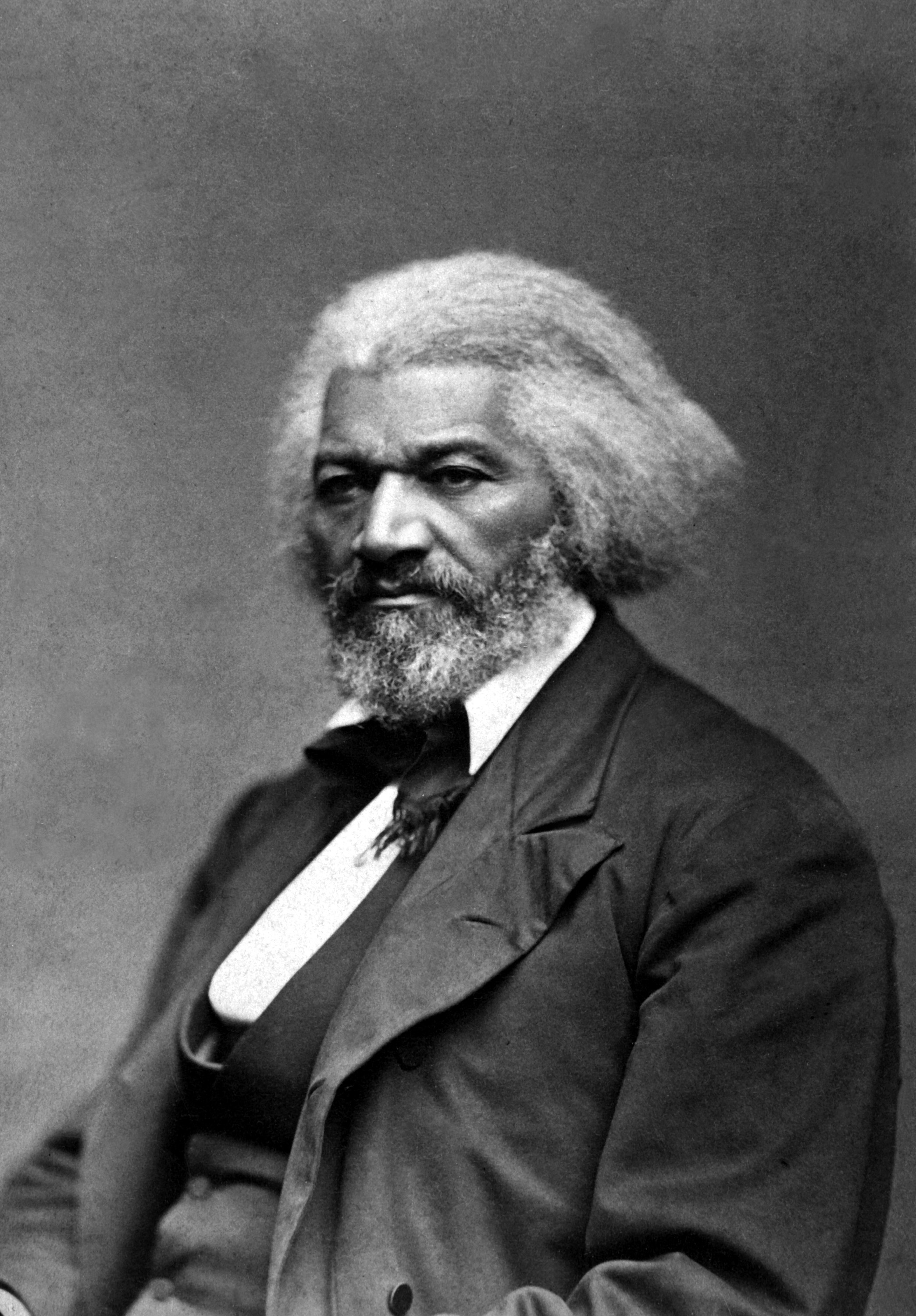
Suffragist
Frederick Douglass
of Washington, D.C.
Illustrations of nominating speeches

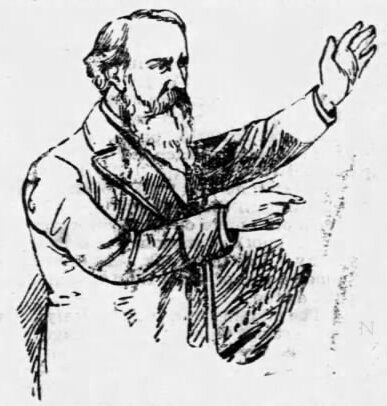
Albert G. Porter speaking on behalf of the nomination of Harrison

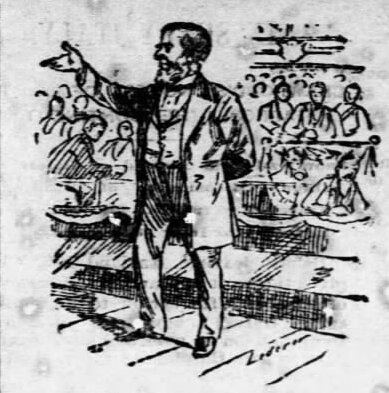
Leonard Swett speaking on behalf of the nomination of Gresham

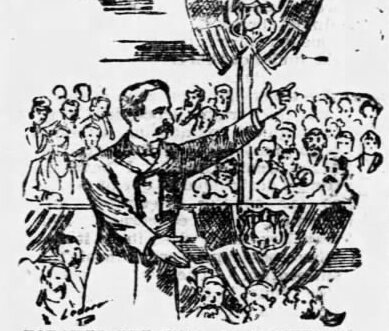
Joseph B. Foraker speaking on behalf of the nomination of Sherman

The early favorite for the nomination was James G. Blaine. After he disclaimed interest, several candidates vied for the prize, with the frontrunners being Russell A. Alger, Walter Q. Gresham, Chauncey Depew, and John Sherman. After several ballots, none of the leading candidates was able to obtain a majority. Benjamin Harrison, who had served in the U.S. Senate from 1881 to 1887, but had lost reelection after the Democrats gained control of the Indiana legislature, was a dark horse candidate. Republicans were dispirited after losing the presidency in 1884 and were attracted to Harrison because of the speech announcing his presidential candidacy, in which he described himself as a "living and rejuvenated Republican." Harrison won the nomination on the eighth ballot and "Rejuvenated Republicanism" became the party's campaign slogan.

Presidential Balloting
Candidate	1st	2nd	3rd	4th	5th	6th	7th	8th
Harrison	85	91	94	216	212	231	279	544
Sherman	229	249	244	235	224	244	230	118
Alger	84	116	122	135	143	137	120	100
Gresham	107	108	123	98	87	91	91	59
Allison	72	75	88	88	99	73	76	0
Depew	99	99	91	0	0	0	0	0
Blaine	35	33	35	42	48	40	15	5
Ingalls	28	16	0	0	0	0	0	0
Phelps	25	18	5	0	0	0	0	0
Rusk	25	20	16	0	0	0	0	0
Fitler	24	0	0	0	0	0	0	0
McKinley	2	3	8	11	14	12	16	4
Hawley	13	0	0	0	0	0	0	0
Lincoln	3	2	2	1	0	0	2	0
Miller	0	0	2	0	0	0	0	0
Douglass	0	0	0	1	0	0	0	0
Foraker	0	0	0	1	0	1	1	0
Grant	0	0	0	0	0	1	0	0
Creed Haymond	0	0	0	0	0	0	1	0
Blank	1	2	2	4	5	2	1	2

Presidential Balloting / 4th Day of Convention (June 22, 1888)

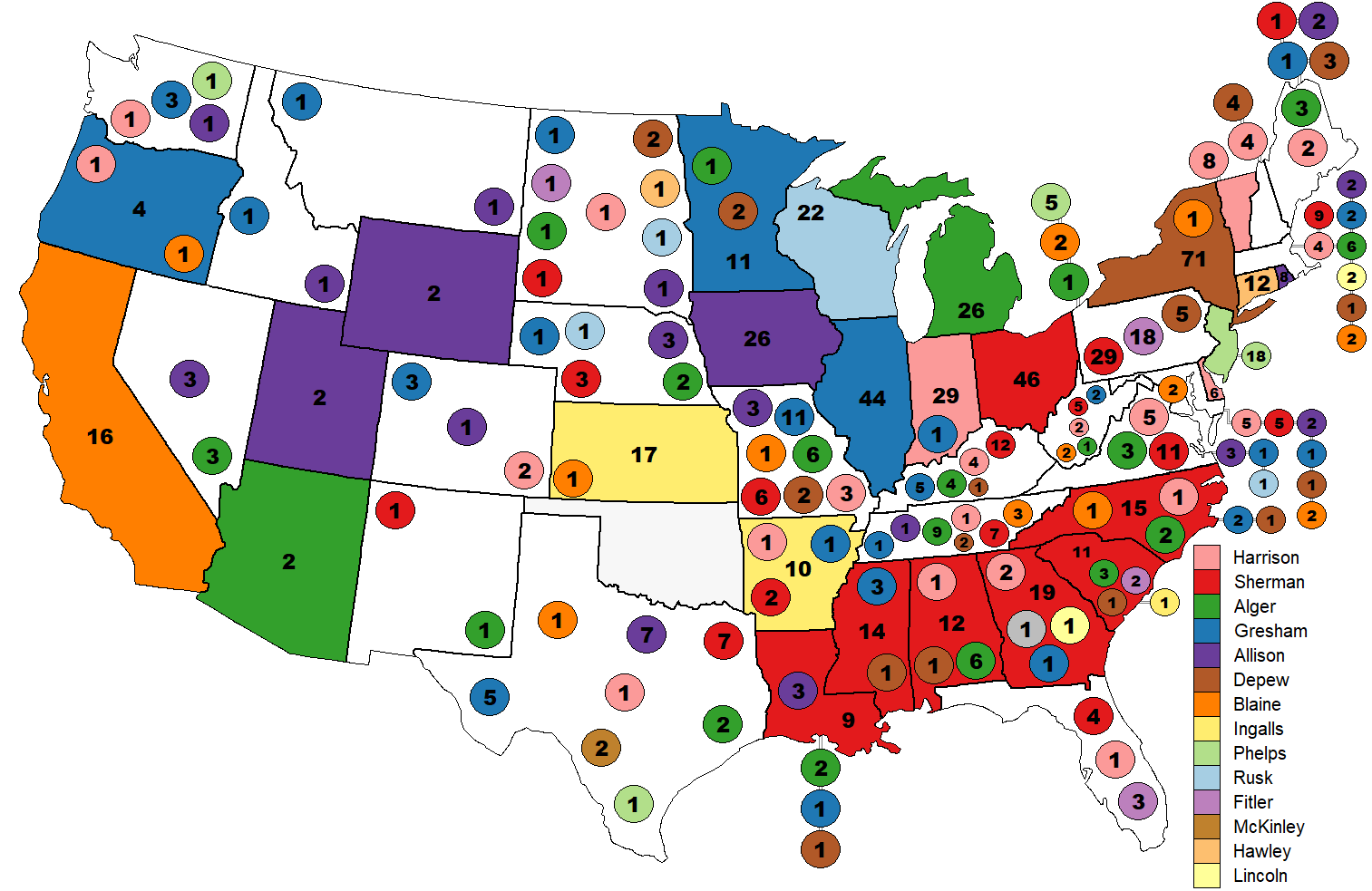
1st Presidential Ballot

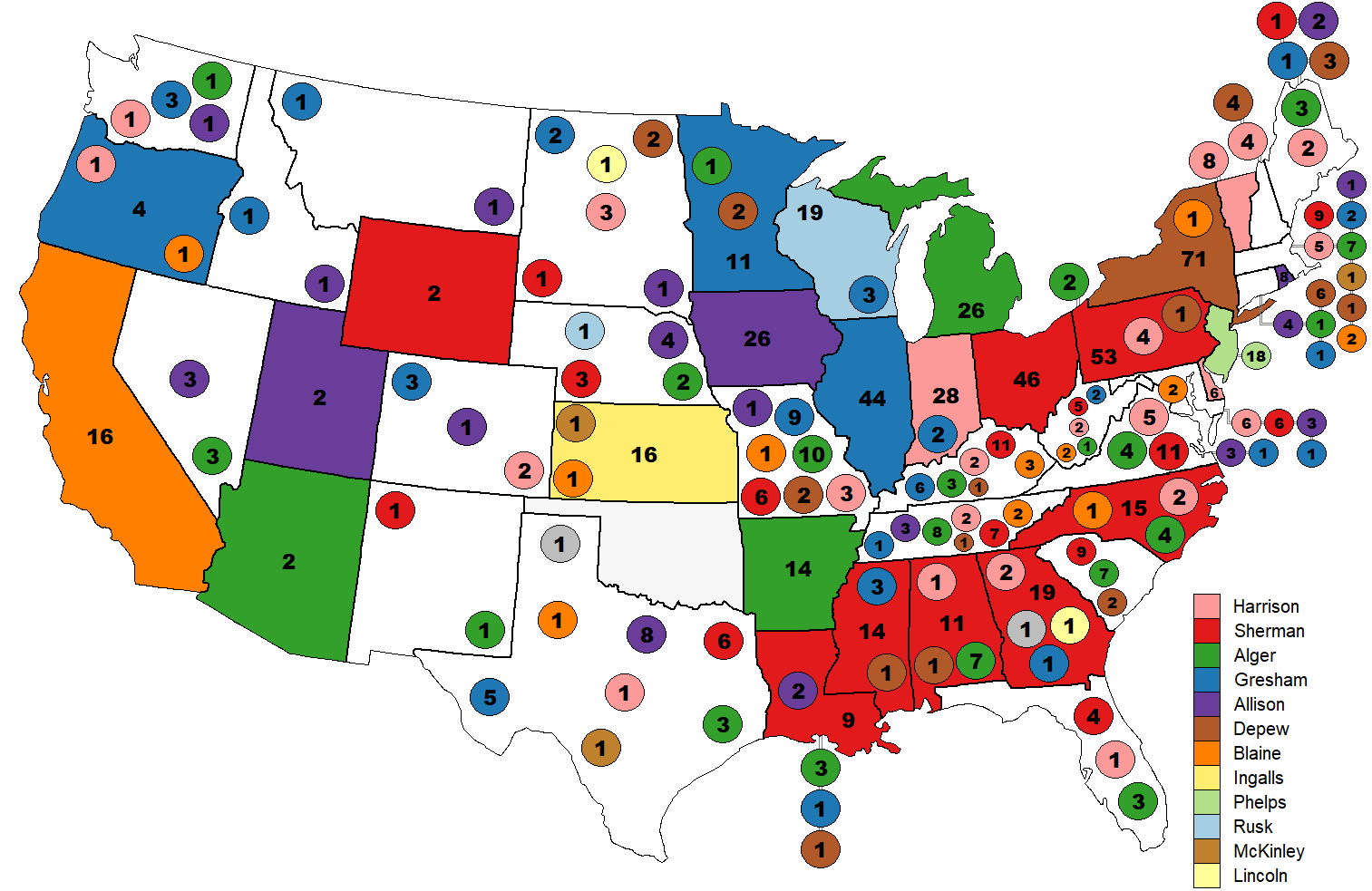
2nd Presidential Ballot

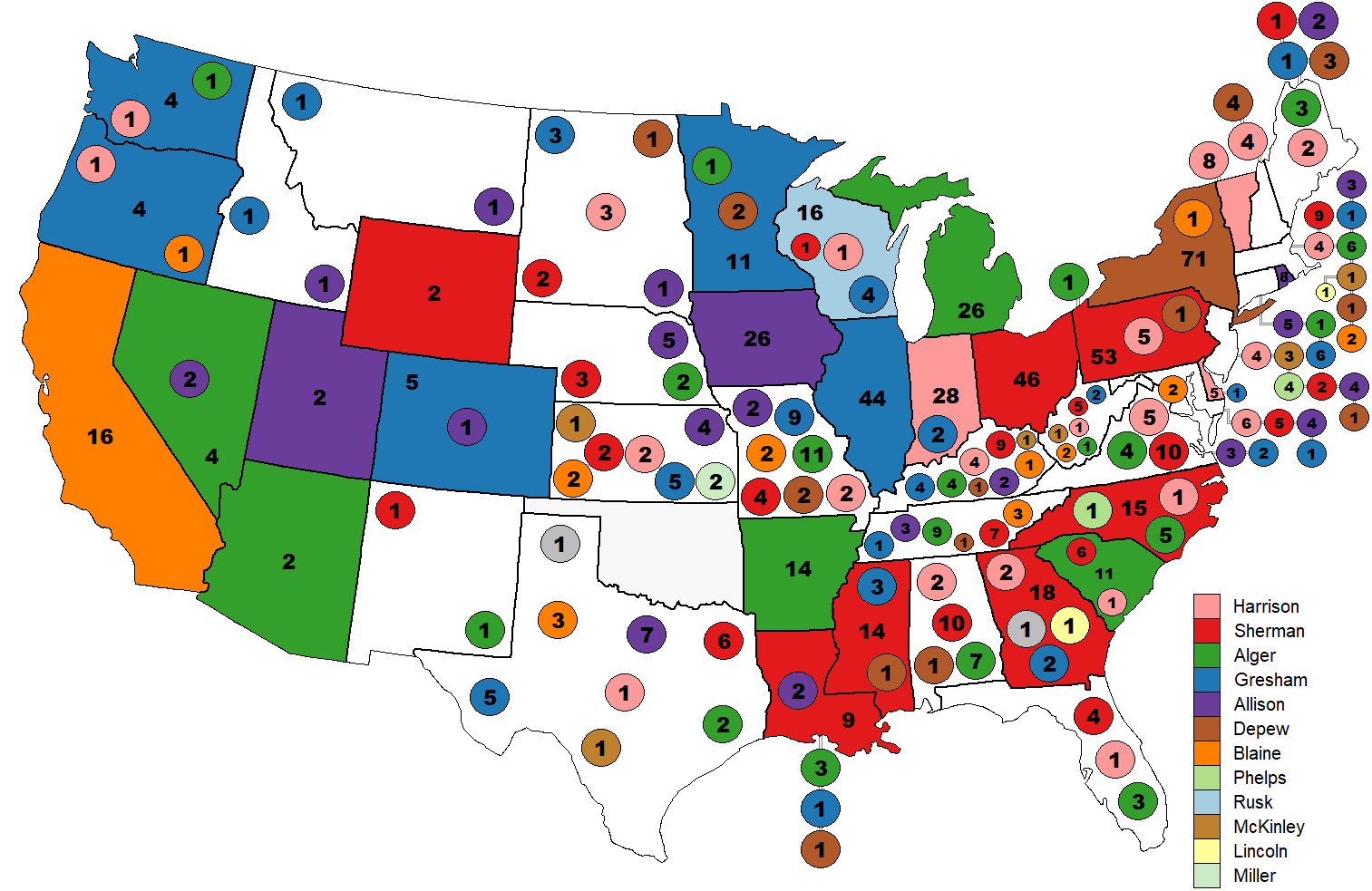
3rd Presidential Ballot

Presidential Balloting / 5th Day of Convention (June 23, 1888)

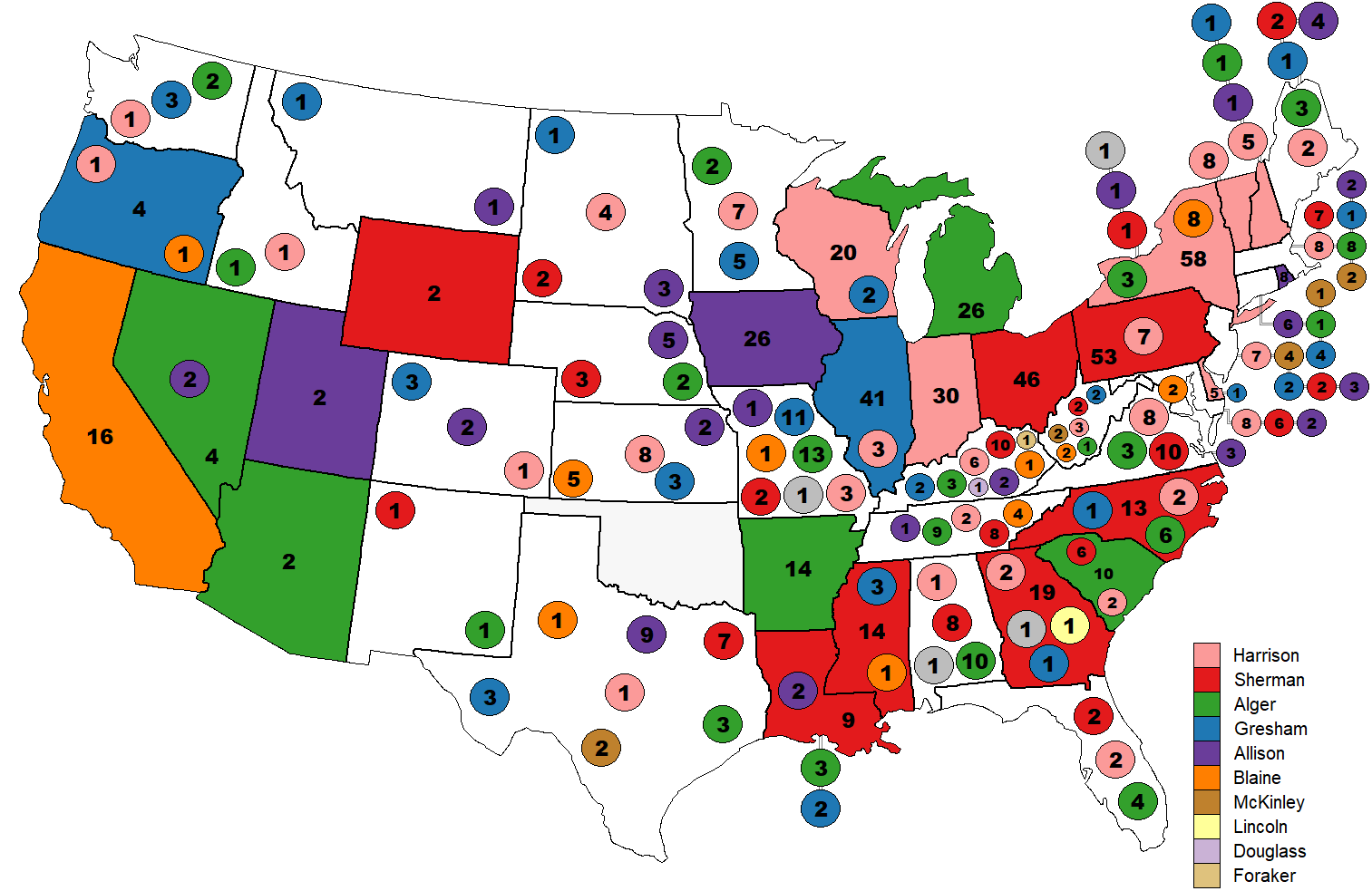
4th Presidential Ballot

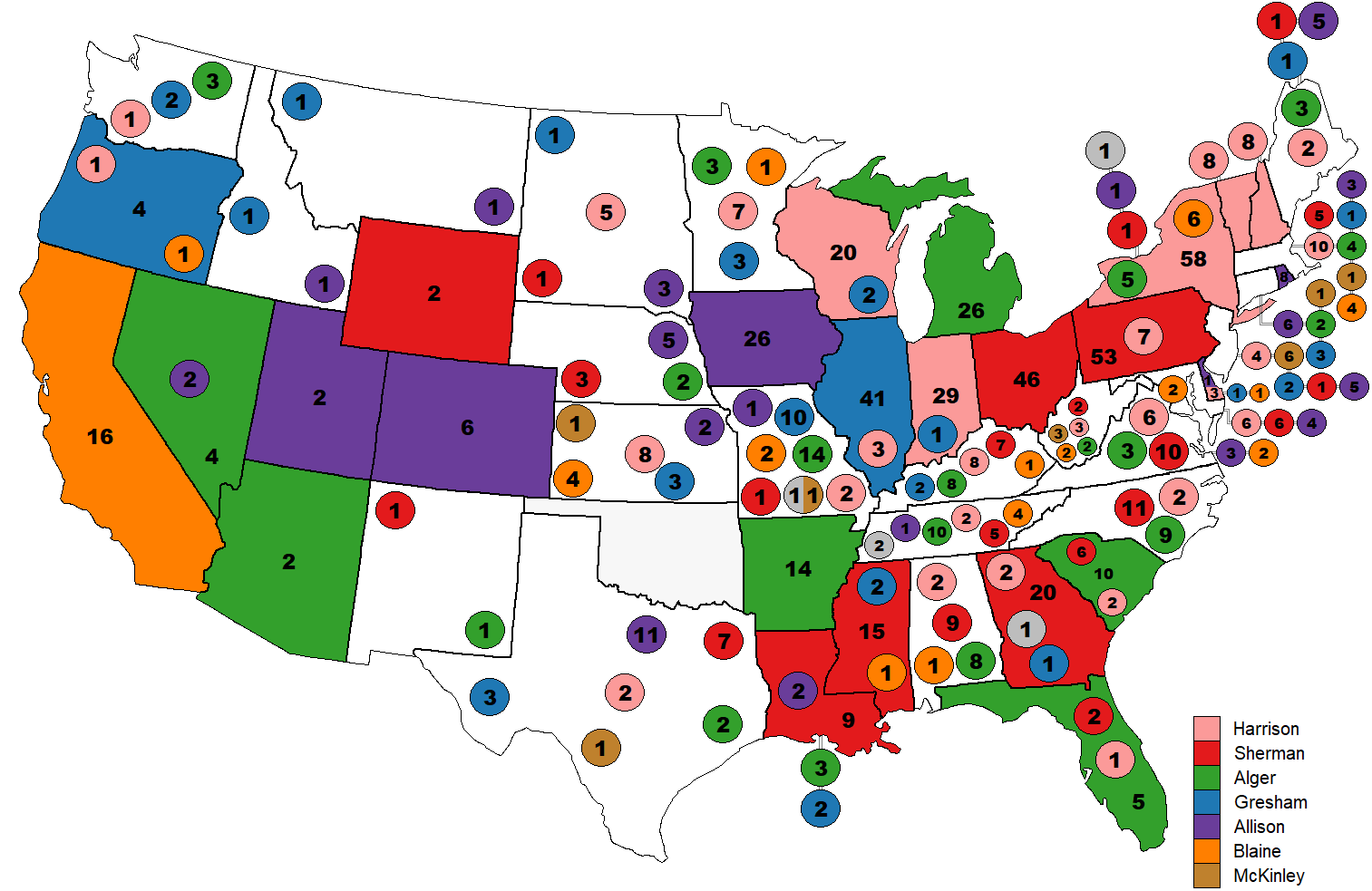
5th Presidential Ballot

Presidential Balloting / 6th Day of Convention (June 25, 1888)

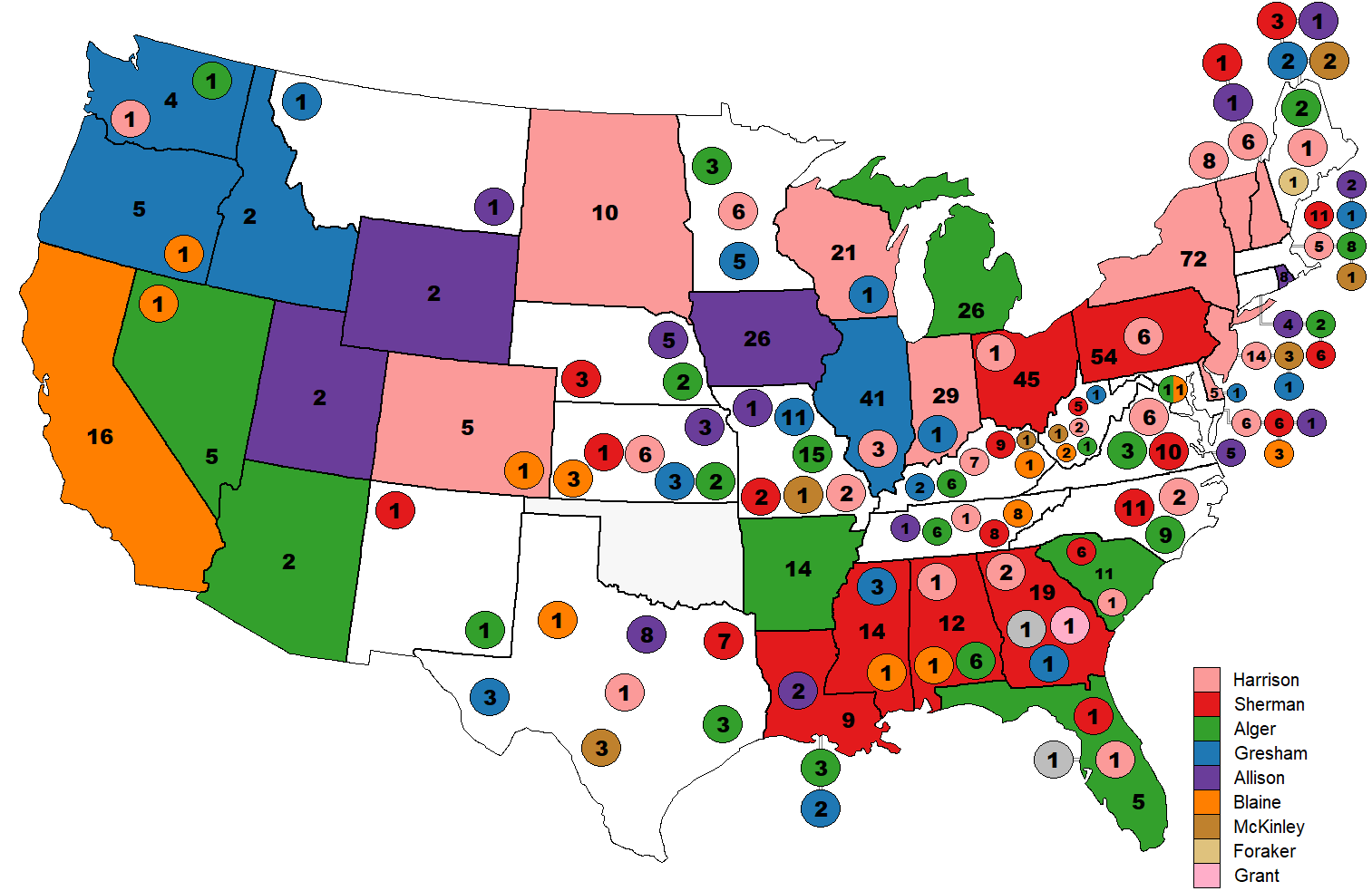
6th Presidential Ballot

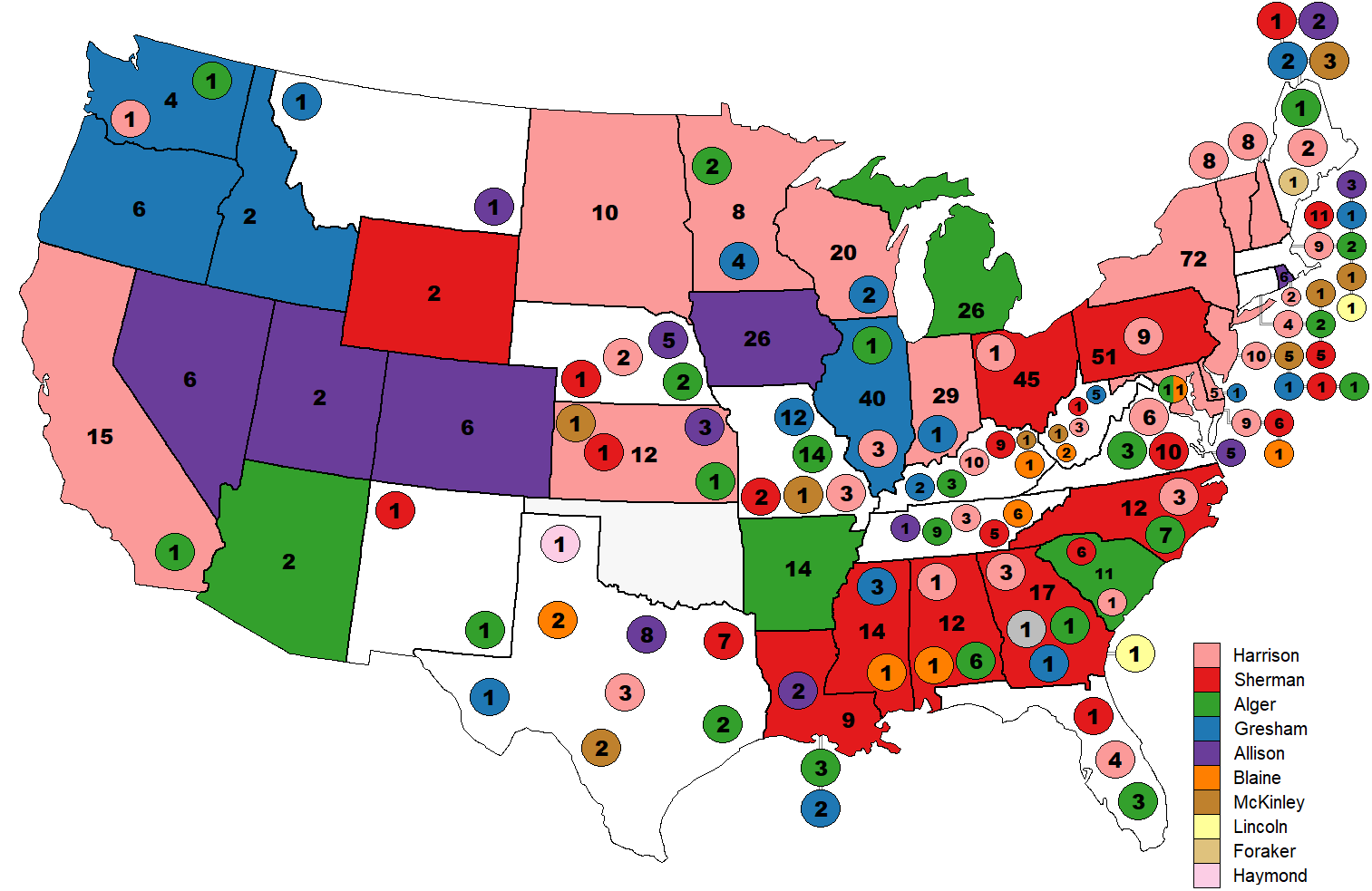
7th Presidential Ballot

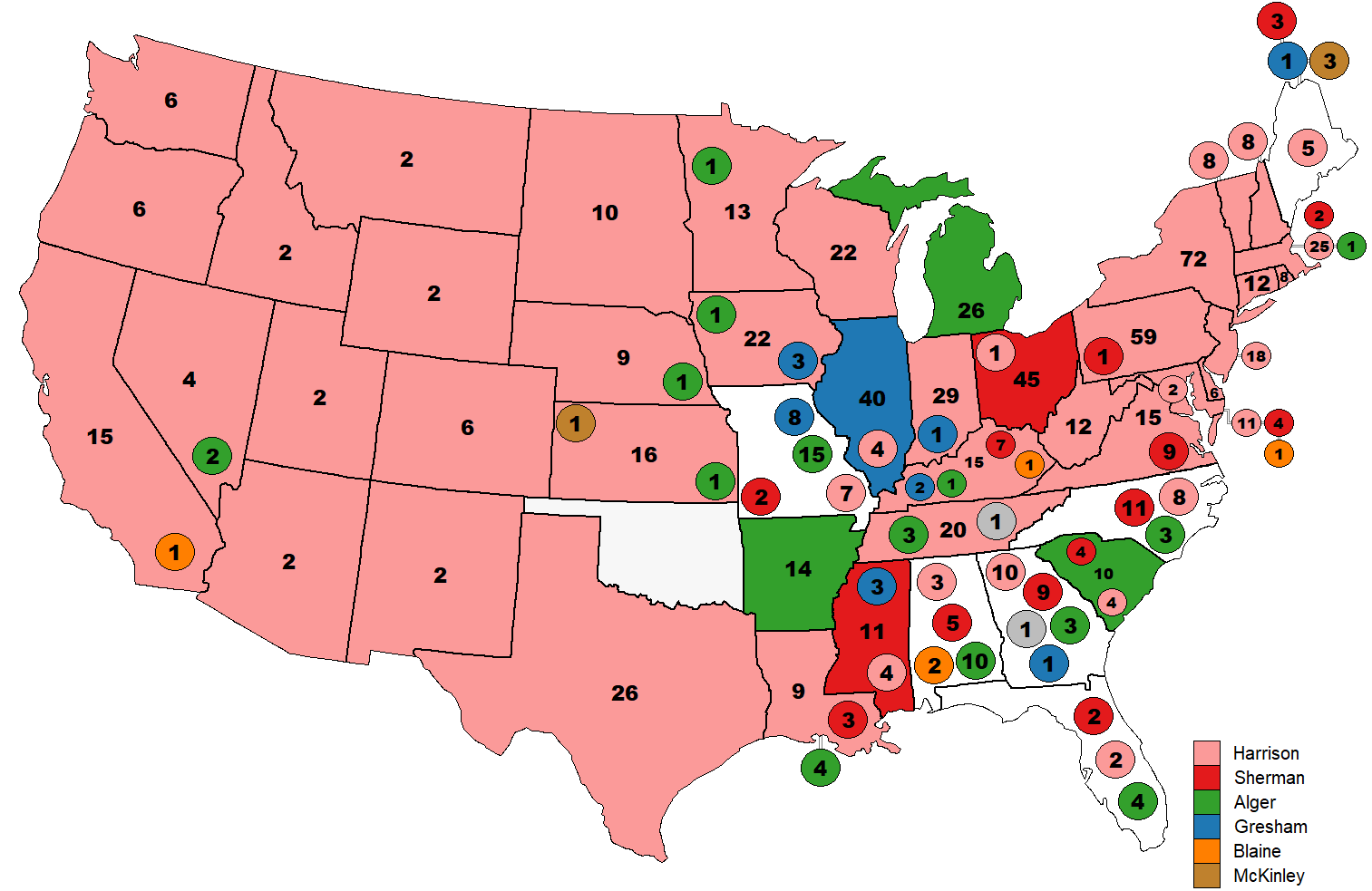
8th Presidential Ballot

== Vice presidential nomination ==
=== Vice presidential candidates ===
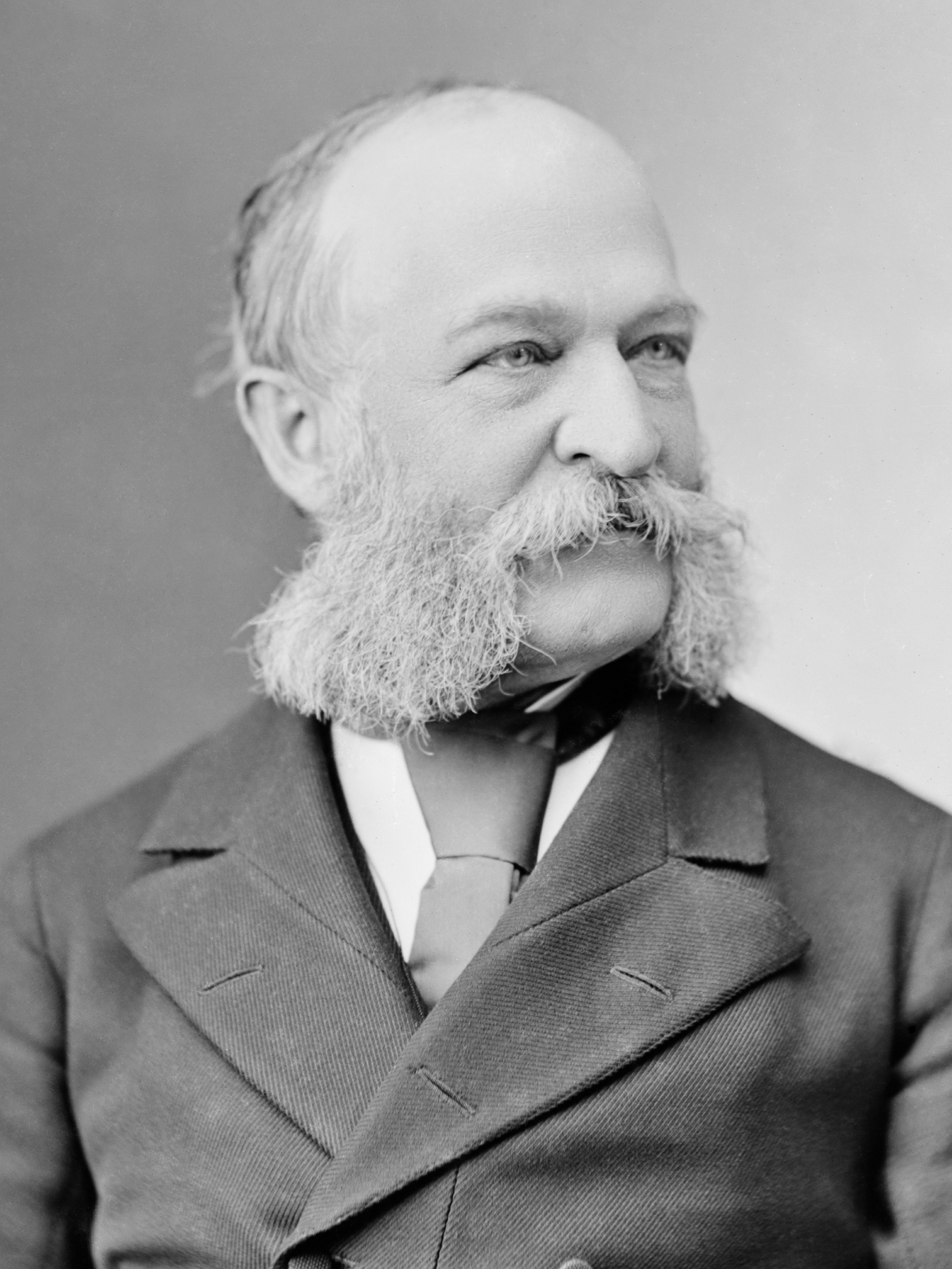
Former Minister
Levi P. Morton
of New York

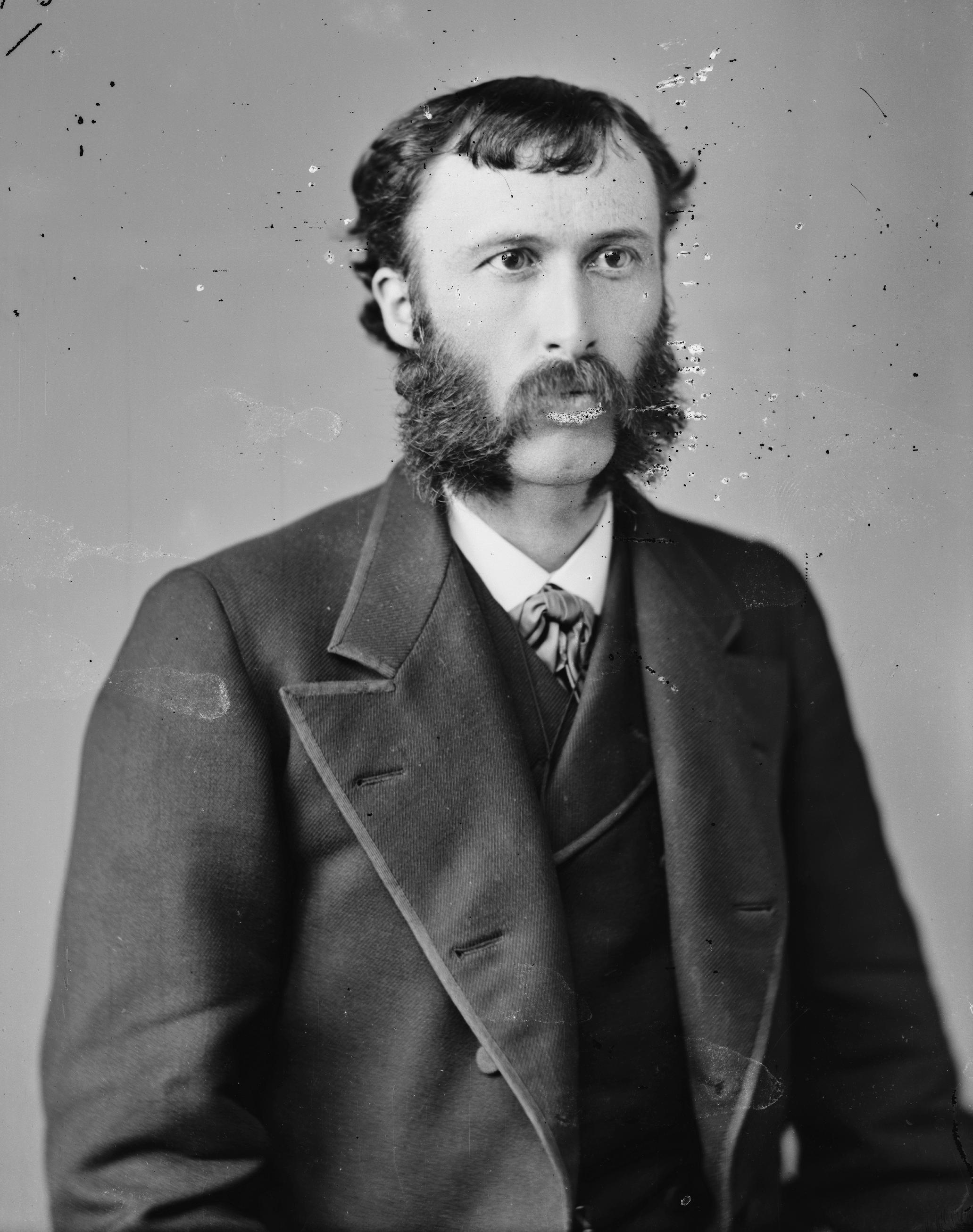
Representative
William W. Phelps
of New Jersey

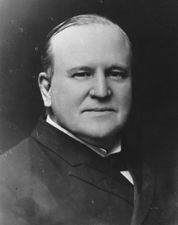
Gubernatorial Candidate
William O. Bradley
of Kentucky

Blaine, who had recommended Harrison for the presidential nomination, suggested former Representative and Minister to Austria-Hungary William Walter Phelps of New Jersey for vice president. Thomas C. Platt, an influential political boss in New York State, supported fellow New Yorker Levi P. Morton, a former Representative and Minister to France. He had been asked in 1880, but declined. This time Morton decided to accept. He was easily elected on the first ballot as Platt's support of Morton helped him defeat Phelps by a margin of five to one.

Vice Presidential Ballot
Candidate	1st
Morton	592
Phelps	119
Bradley	103
Bruce	11
Thomas	1
Not Voting	6

Vice Presidential Balloting / 6th Day of Convention (June 25, 1888)

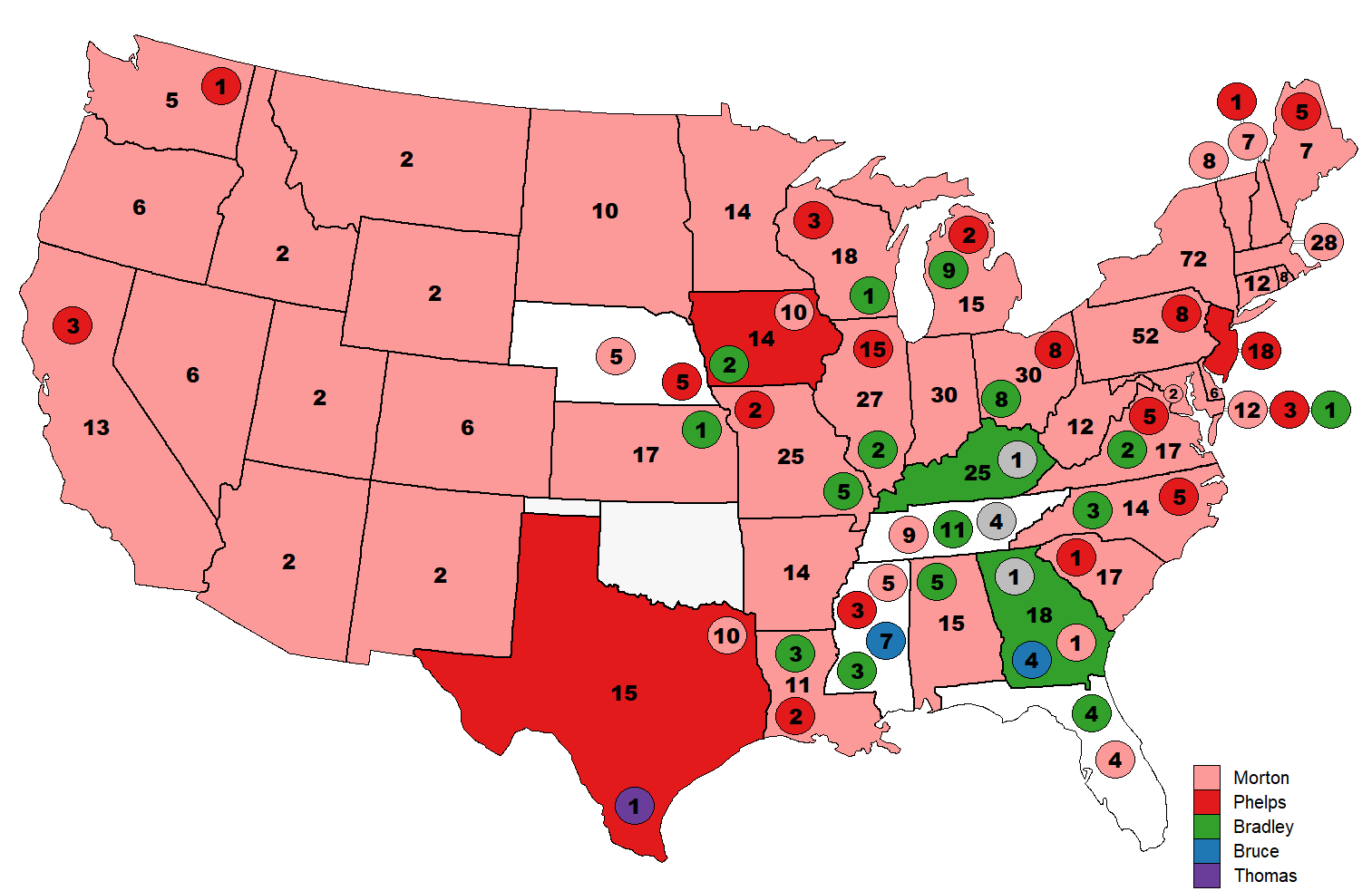
1st
Vice Presidential Ballot

== Accusation of delegate vote-buying ==
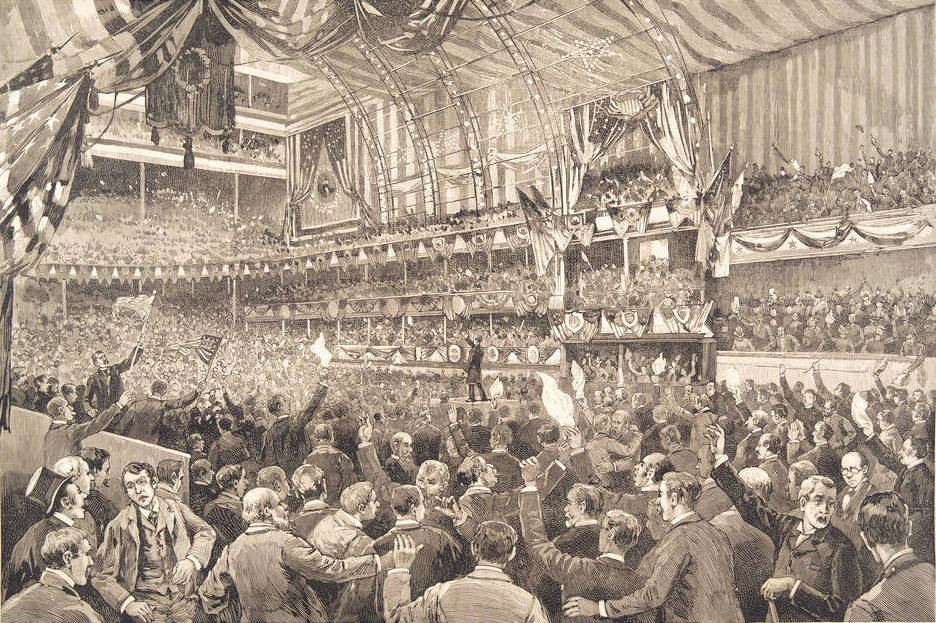
Illustration of the convention

Nearly a decade later, Ohio candidate John Sherman accused Michigan candidate millionaire Russell A. Alger of buying the votes of Southern delegates who had already confirmed their vote for Sherman. In Sherman's 1895 two-volume book "Recollections" he asserted, "I believe, and had, as I thought, conclusive proof, that the friends of Gen. Alger substantially purchased the votes of many of the delegates from the Southern States who had been instructed by their conventions to vote for me." Once accused, Alger submitted correspondence to the New York Times, who published one letter from 1888, written after the convention to Alger, where Sherman states, "if you bought some [votes], according to universal usage, surely I don't blame you." Later in the same New York Times article, Alger insisted neither he or friends bought a single vote. The article also quotes another delegate, James Lewis, who claimed that "the colored delegates of the South will unite on a Union soldier in preference" instead of a civilian.

When Sherman introduced his antitrust legislation two years later, his main example of unlawful combination drew from a Michigan Supreme Court case involving Diamond Match Company and Alger's participation as president and stock holder.

== See also ==
- History of the United States Republican Party
- List of Republican National Conventions
- United States presidential nominating convention
- 1888 United States presidential election
- 1888 Democratic National Convention

Preceded by 1884; Chicago	Republican National Conventions	Succeeded by 1892; Minneapolis
