= Albert Smith White =

American judge

Albert S. White
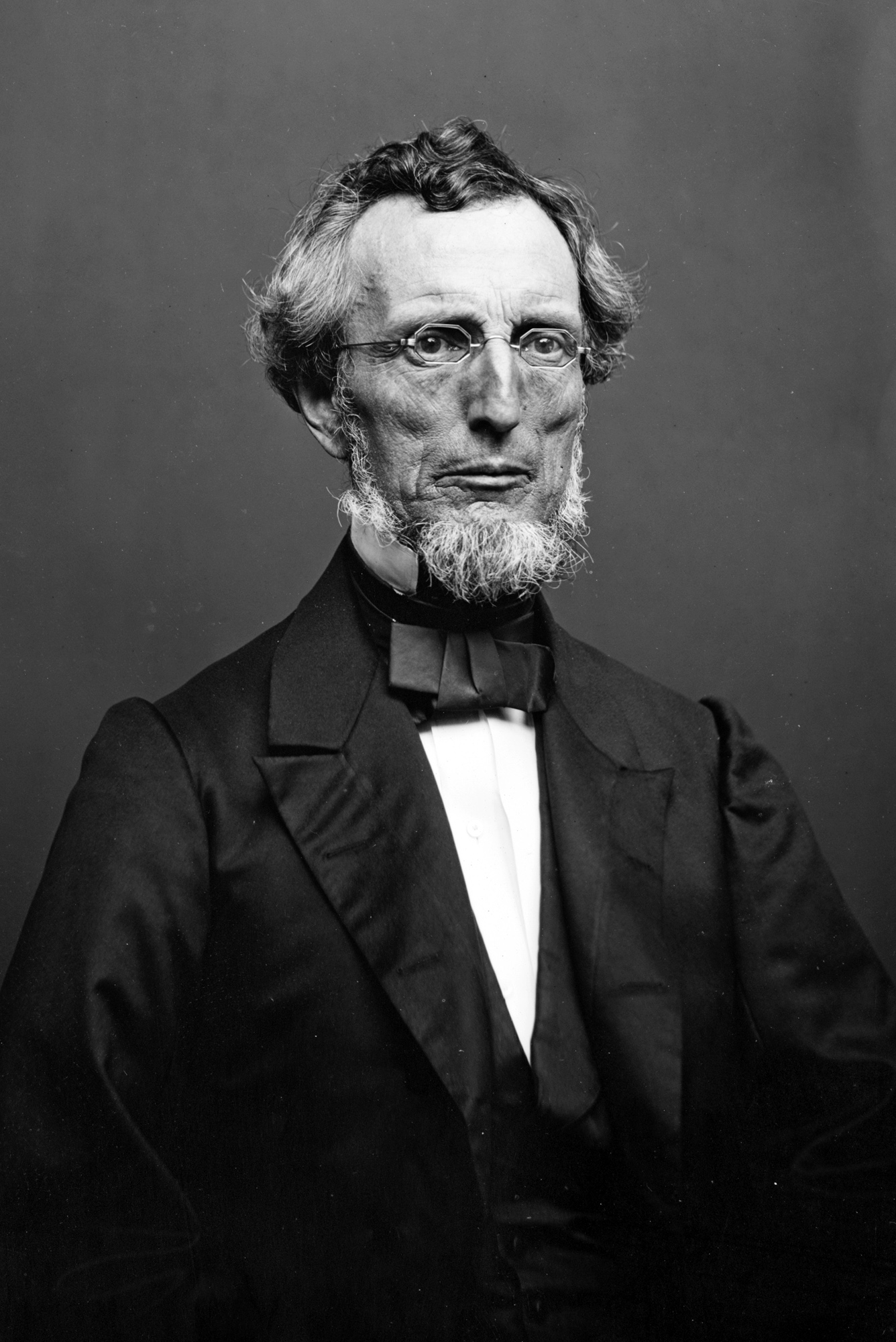
- Portrait, c. 1855–1865

Judge of the United States District Court for the District of Indiana
- In office January 18, 1864 – September 4, 1864
- Appointed by: Abraham Lincoln
- Preceded by: Caleb Blood Smith
- Succeeded by: David McDonald

Member of the U.S. House of Representatives from Indiana's 8th district
- In office March 4, 1861 – March 3, 1863
- Preceded by: James Wilson
- Succeeded by: Godlove Stein Orth

United States Senator from Indiana
- In office March 4, 1839 – March 3, 1845
- Preceded by: John Tipton
- Succeeded by: Jesse D. Bright

Member of the U.S. House of Representatives from Indiana's 7th district
- In office March 4, 1837 – March 3, 1839
- Preceded by: Edward A. Hannegan
- Succeeded by: Tilghman Howard

Personal details
- Born: Albert Smith White; October 24, 1803 Blooming Grove, New York, US
- Died: September 4, 1864 (aged 60) Stockwell, Indiana, US
- Resting place: Greenbush Cemetery; Lafayette, Indiana, US
- Party: Whig (until 1854); Republican (from 1854)
- Education: Union College read law

Albert Smith White (October 24, 1803 – September 4, 1864) was a 19th-century American lawyer, politician, and jurist who served as a United States senator from Indiana, a United States representative from Indiana and a United States district judge of the United States District Court for the District of Indiana.

== Education and career ==
Born on October 24, 1803, in Blooming Grove, New York, White graduated from Union College in 1822 and read law in 1825. He was admitted to the bar and entered private practice in New York from 1825 and 1829. He continued private practice in Lafayette, Indiana, from 1829 to 1836. He was an assistant clerk for the Indiana House of Representatives from 1830 to 1831. He was a candidate for the United States House of Representatives from Indiana in 1832. He was clerk of the Indiana House of Representatives from 1832 to 1835. He was a Presidential Elector on the Whig ticket in 1836.

== Congressional service ==
White was elected as a Whig from Indiana's 7th congressional district to the United States House of Representatives of the 25th United States Congress, serving from March 4, 1837, to March 3, 1839. He was not a candidate for renomination in 1838. He was elected as a Whig to the United States Senate and served from March 4, 1839, to March 3, 1845. He declined to be a candidate for reelection. He was chairman of the United States Senate Committee to Audit and Control the Contingent Expenses in the 27th United States Congress and chairman of the United States Senate Committee on Indian Affairs in the 27th and 28th United States Congresses.

== Later career ==
Following his departure from the Senate, White resumed private practice in Stockwell, Indiana, from 1845 to 1861, also serving as president of several railroads during that time period, including the Indianapolis and La Fayette Railroad and the Wabash and Western Railway.

== Subsequent congressional service ==
White was elected as a Republican from Indiana's 8th congressional district to the United States House of Representatives of the 37th United States Congress, serving from March 4, 1861, to March 3, 1863. He was not a candidate for renomination in 1862. He was appointed by President Lincoln as one of three commissioners to adjust the claims of citizens of Minnesota and the Dakota Territory against the United States Government for Indian depredations, relating to a Sioux Indian Massacre occurring in 1862.

== Federal judicial service ==
White was nominated by President Abraham Lincoln on January 14, 1864, to a seat on the United States District Court for the District of Indiana vacated by Judge Caleb Blood Smith. He was confirmed by the United States Senate on January 18, 1864, and received his commission the same day.

== Death and burial ==
He died on September 4, 1864, seven and a half months after his appointment. He was interred in Greenbush Cemetery in Lafayette.

== Sources ==
- United States Congress. "Albert Smith White (id: W000351)". Biographical Directory of the United States Congress.
- "White, Albert Smith". fjc.gov.

U.S. House of Representatives
Preceded by Edward A. Hannegan	Member of the U.S. House of Representatives from Indiana's 7th congressional district 1837–1839	Succeeded by Tilghman Howard
Preceded by James Wilson	Member of the U.S. House of Representatives from Indiana's 8th congressional district 1861–1863	Succeeded by Godlove Stein Orth
U.S. Senate
Preceded by John Tipton	U.S. senator (Class 1) from Indiana; 1839–1845; Served alongside: Oliver H. Smith and Edward A. Hannegan	Succeeded by Jesse D. Bright
Legal offices
Preceded by Caleb Blood Smith	Judge of the United States District Court for the District of Indiana; 1864	Succeeded by David McDonald
