= Oceana Publications =

Defunct legal publisher

- Industry: Legal publications
- Founded: 1945; 81 years ago
- Defunct: 2005
- Fate: Acquired by Oxford University Press
- Headquarters: Dobbs Ferry, New York, United States
- Website: Oceanalaw.com, from Internet Archive.

Oceana Publications Inc. was a legal publisher. It was founded in 1945. It was based in Dobbs Ferry, New York. Oxford University Press acquired the assets of the company in 2005.
