= Presidency of Grover Cleveland =

Presidency of Grover Cleveland may refer to:

- First presidency of Grover Cleveland, the United States presidential administration from 1885 to 1889
- Second presidency of Grover Cleveland, the United States presidential administration from 1893 to 1897

== See also ==
- Cabinet of Grover Cleveland (disambiguation)
- Inauguration of Grover Cleveland (disambiguation)
