= Inauguration of Grover Cleveland =

Inauguration of Grover Cleveland may refer to:

- First inauguration of Grover Cleveland, held in 1885 on his first of two presidencies
- Second inauguration of Grover Cleveland, held in 1893 on his second and last presidency

== See also ==
- The full text of Grover Cleveland's First Inaugural Address at Wikisource
- The full text of Grover Cleveland's Second Inaugural Address at Wikisource
