= Timeline of the first Grover Cleveland presidency =

The first presidency of Grover Cleveland began on March 4, 1885, when Grover Cleveland was inaugurated as the twenty-second president of the United States and ended on March 4, 1889, after one term. He served a second term from 1893 to 1897.

== 1885 ==
=== March 1885 ===
- March 4 – Grover Cleveland is inaugurated as the twenty-second president of the United States. Thomas A. Hendricks becomes vice president of the United States.
- March 6 – Thomas F. Bayard, Daniel Manning, William Crowninshield Endicott, Augustus H. Garland, William F. Vilas, William Collins Whitney, and Lucius Quintus Cincinnatus Lamar become secretary of state, secretary of the treasury, secretary of war, attorney general, postmaster general, secretary of the navy, and secretary of the interior, respectively.
- March 13 – Cleveland issues a proclamation to prohibit the settling of Native American territory in Oklahoma.

=== June 1885 ===
- June 17 – The individual parts of the Statue of Liberty arrive in New York.

=== July 1885 ===
- July 23
  - Cleveland issues a proclamation prohibiting the use of Cheyenne or Arapaho lands for cattle grazing.
  - Former president Ulysses S. Grant dies. The offices of the executive branch close early.

=== August 1885 ===
- August 7 – Cleveland issues a proclamation ordering the removal of illegal enclosures on public lands.

=== October 1885 ===
- October 1 – Cleveland issues an executive order appointing a physician to study cholera. This is a response to an ongoing cholera pandemic in Europe.

=== November 1885 ===
- November 7 – Cleveland issues a proclamation declaring a state of emergency in Washington. This allows him to send federal soldiers to the territory after anti-Chinese violence in Washington, including the Tacoma riot.
- November 25 – Vice President Thomas A. Hendricks dies.

=== December 1885 ===
- December 5 – The United States signs a boundary agreement with Mexico for territory west of the Rio Grande.
- December 7 – The 49th United States Congress convenes for its first session.
- December 8 – Cleveland delivers the 1885 State of the Union Address.
- December 14 – Cleveland asks Congress to grant more funds for the Cheyenne in Montana.

== 1886 ==
=== January 1886 ===
- January 19 – The Presidential Succession Act of 1886 amends the presidential line of succession so the heads of the executive departments are next in line to serve as acting president if there is no president or vice president.

=== February 1886 ===
- February 4 – Cleveland asks Congress to authorize the purchase of land from Native Americans in Miami.
- February 9 – Cleveland issues a proclamation declaring that he will have soldiers disperse anti-Chinese race riots in Seattle.
- February 26 – The United States signs a treaty exempting vessels from read measurement with Denmark.

=== March 1886 ===
- March 1 – Cleveland tells the Senate he should not have to provide the entirety of documentation around his selection of political appointments. He says that this would be an overreach of the legislative into the duties of the executive. The Senate decides against pursuing this further.
- March 11 – Cleveland vetoes a bill that would create public land out of private settler-owned land in Iowa. He says this is something to be addressed by Iowa's government and judiciary.
- March 15 – The United States signs international conventions to establish international exchange of official documents.

=== April 1886 ===
- April 12 – Howell E. Jackson is confirmed to the U.S. Circuit Court for the Sixth Circuit.
- April 22 – Cleveland asks Congress to create a committee for labor disputes.
- April 29 – The United States signs an extradition treaty with Japan.

=== May 1886 ===
- May 1 – Protests break out in favor of an eight-hour work day.
- May 3 – A small labor protest is attacked by police at the McCormick Harvesting Machine Company, killing one protester.
- May 4 – In the Haymarket affair, a bombing is carried out at a protest against the previous day's police violence. Seven police officers and four workers are killed.
- May 8 – Cleveland vetoes a bill that would grant military pensions to Union veterans whose applications were denied by the Pensions Bureau. He will veto a total of 255 pension bills while president.
- May 11
  - Cleveland formally accepts the Statue of Liberty as a gift from France.
  - Cleveland asks Congress to reassemble the legislature of the Utah Territory so funds can be reappropriated.
- May 14 – The United States signs a commerce treaty with Mexico.
- May 25 – Cleveland announces that he is engaged to Frances Folsom.

=== June 1886 ===
- June 2 – Cleveland marries Frances Folsom.

=== July 1886 ===
- July 3 – The United States signs a treaty of import duty and consuls with the Sultanate of Zanzibar.
- July 7 – Cleveland vetoes a bill that would authorize a public building in Dayton, Ohio. He says that Dayton already has two public buildings that were sufficient.

=== August 1886 ===
- August 3 – Congress overrides one of Cleveland's vetoes against pension bills. The bill grants a pension to Joseph Romiser, a man who reported that he was injured in an accidental musket discharge while serving in the military.
- August 5 – The 49th United States Congress adjourns from its first session.
- August 20 – Ten people are found guilty of the Haymarket affair bombing.

=== October 1886 ===
- October 2 – The United States signs a treaty of amity, commerce, and navigation with Tonga.
- October 13 – Cleveland issues a proclamation temporarily ending trade with Spanish ships coming from Cuba or Puerto Rico.
- October 27 – The United States signs a treaty with Spain regarding commercial relations with respect to Cuba and Puerto Rico.
- October 28 – Cleveland speaks at the dedication of the Statue of Liberty.

=== November 1886 ===
- November 10 – Four of the ten people convicted of the Haymarket affair bombing are hanged.

=== December 1886 ===
- December 1 – The United States signs an international agreement on the protection of submarine cables.
- December 6 – The 49th United States Congress convenes for its second session.
- December 8 – The American Federation of Labor trade union is established by Samuel Gompers in Columbus, Ohio.

== 1887 ==
=== February 1887 ===
- February 4 – The Interstate Commerce Act of 1887 creates the Interstate Commerce Commission within the Department of the Interior. Created to regulate railroads, this is the first independent regulatory agency in the United States.
- February 8 – The Dawes Act gives every Native American family a free plot of land and allows Native Americans who renounced their tribal holdings to apply for citizenship. It restricts Native American control over tribal land.
- February 11 – Cleveland vetoes the Dependent and Disability Pension Act, which would grant military pensions to anyone who had at least ninety days of military service. He says it was poorly written in a way that would result in fraudulent claims.
- February 16 – Cleveland vetoes the Texas Seed Bill, which would provide drought relief to farmers. He says it would exercise powers that the federal government does not have.

=== March 1887 ===
- March 2 – The Hatch Act of 1887 provides grants to create agricultural experiment stations in land-grant universities.
- March 3
  - Congress overrides Cleveland's July veto of constructing a public building in Dayton, Ohio.
  - The Tenure of Office Act, which prohibited presidents from unilaterally firing Senate-confirmed officeholders, is repealed.
  - The 49th United States Congress adjourns from its second session.
- March 28 – The United States signs an extradition treaty with Russia.

=== April 1887 ===
- April 1 – Charles S. Fairchild succeeds Daniel Manning as secretary of the treasury.
- April 22
  - Cleveland issues an executive order to regulate militia weapons and equipment in federal territory.
  - Cleveland issues a proclamation to suspend duties on imports from the Netherlands.

=== May 1887 ===
- May 9 – Cleveland issues a proclamation to close the executive for a day to honor former president James A. Garfield.
- May 26 – Cleveland appoints Emile Henry Lacombe to the U.S. Circuit Court for the Second Circuit as a recess appointment.

=== June 1887 ===
- June 2 – The United States signs an extradition treaty with the Netherlands.
- June 7 – Cleveland issues an executive order for seized Confederate battle flags to be returned to the Southern states.
- June 19 – Cleveland issues an executive order retracting his decision to return Confederate battle flags to the Southern states. His original order had been controversial, and he concluded that he does not have the power to return the flags.

=== July 1887 ===
- July 6 – King Kalākaua of the Hawaiian Kingdom approves a new constitution that reduces his power. He is compelled to sign it by the Honolulu Rifles militia, which has the backing of American landowners in Hawaii.
- July 7 – The United States signs an international agreement on the protection of submarine cables.

=== August 1887 ===
- August 31 – The United States signs a treaty of friendship, commerce, and navigation with Peru.

=== September 1887 ===
- September 21 – The United States signs a commercial treaty with Spain regarding its territorial possessions. Cleveland issues a proclamation suspending duties on imports from Spain.
- September 30 – Cleveland begins a tour of the Southern and Western states.

=== October 1887 ===
- October 22 – Cleveland returns from his tour of the Southern and Western states.

=== December 1887 ===
- December 5 – The 50th United States Congress convenes for its first session.
- December 6
  - Cleveland delivers the 1887 State of the Union Address. The only issue he addresses is tariffs, which he criticizes for being too high.
  - Cleveland nominates Secretary of the Interior Lucius Quintus Cincinnatus Lamar to the Supreme Court.
- December 21 – The United States signs a commercial treaty with Spain regarding its territorial possessions.
- December 30 – Cleveland issues a proclamation saying that Greer County is federal land and not part of Texas.

== 1888 ==
=== January 1888 ===
- January 11 – Lucius Quintus Cincinnatus Lamar ends his tenure as secretary of the interior.
- January 16
  - Lucius Quintus Cincinnatus Lamar is confirmed to the Supreme Court.
  - Donald M. Dickinson succeeds William F. Vilas as postmaster general. Vilas becomes secretary of the interior, filling the vacancy left by Lucius Quintus Cincinnatus Lamar.

=== February 1888 ===
- February 2 – Cleveland issues an executive order reforming the Civil Service Commission and revising the regulations it set.
- February 18 – The United States signs a fishery treaty with the United Kingdom regarding Canada and Newfoundland.
- February 28 – Cleveland's recess appointment Emile Henry Lacombe is confirmed to the U.S. Circuit Court for the Second Circuit.

=== April 1888 ===
- April 16 – Cleveland issues a proclamation suspending duties on imports from Guadeloupe.
- April 30 – Cleveland nominates Melville Fuller as Chief Justice of the United States.

=== May 1888 ===
- May 7 – The United States signs an extradition treaty with Colombia.
- May 24 – The president is authorized to create a Pan-American Conference in 1889.
- May 26 – The United States signs a commercial treaty with Spain regarding its territorial possessions.

=== June 1888 ===
- June 7 – The 1888 Democratic National Convention selects Cleveland as the Democratic Party's presidential nominee, with former senator Allen G. Thurman as his running mate.
- June 13 – The Department of Labor is established.
- June 25 – The 1888 Republican National Convention selects Senator Benjamin Harrison as the Republican Party's presidential nominee, with banker Levi P. Morton as his running mate.

=== July 1888 ===
- July 20 – Melville Fuller is confirmed as Chief Justice of the United States.

=== October 1888 ===
- October 1
  - The Arbitration Act of 1888 allows parties in railway disputes to engage in voluntary arbitration and authorizes the president to create a commission to resolve labor disputes.
  - The Scott Act of 1888 adds to the restrictions imposed by the Chinese Exclusion Act of 1882. It prohibits Chinese laborers from returning once they leave the United States.
- October 8 – Melville Fuller is sworn in as Chief Justice of the United States.
- October 20 – The 50th United States Congress adjourns from its first session.

=== November 1888 ===
- November 6 – The 1888 United States elections take place. Benjamin Harrison defeats Cleveland in the 1888 presidential election, with 233 electoral votes to Cleveland's 168. Cleveland wins the popular vote.

=== December 1888 ===
- December 3
  - The 50th United States Congress convenes for its second session.
  - Cleveland delivers the 1888 State of the Union Address.
- December 25 – Cleveland issues an executive order designating rail mail employees as classified, which allows them to be examined.

== 1889 ==
=== February 1889 ===
- February 11 – The Department of Agriculture is established.
- February 13 – Norman Jay Colman becomes the first secretary of agriculture.
- February 18 – The United States signs a boundary agreement with Mexico regarding territory west of the Rio Grande.
- February 22 – North Dakota, South Dakota, Montana, and Washington are authorized to seek statehood.

=== March 1889 ===
- March 1 – The United States signs a boundary agreement with Mexico regarding the Rio Grande.
- March 2 – A law is passed to protect salmon fisheries in Alaska.
- March 3 – The 50th United States Congress adjourns from its second session.
- March 4 – Cleveland's term ends and Benjamin Harrison is inaugurated as the twenty-third president. Cleveland will defeat Harrison in the 1892 presidential election and become the twenty-fourth president on March 4, 1893.

== See also ==
- Timeline of the second Grover Cleveland presidency

== Works cited ==
- Bevans, Charles I. (1968). Treaties and Other International Agreements of the United States of America, 1776-1949. United States Department of State.
