= The Milker's Mishap =

1897 silent short film

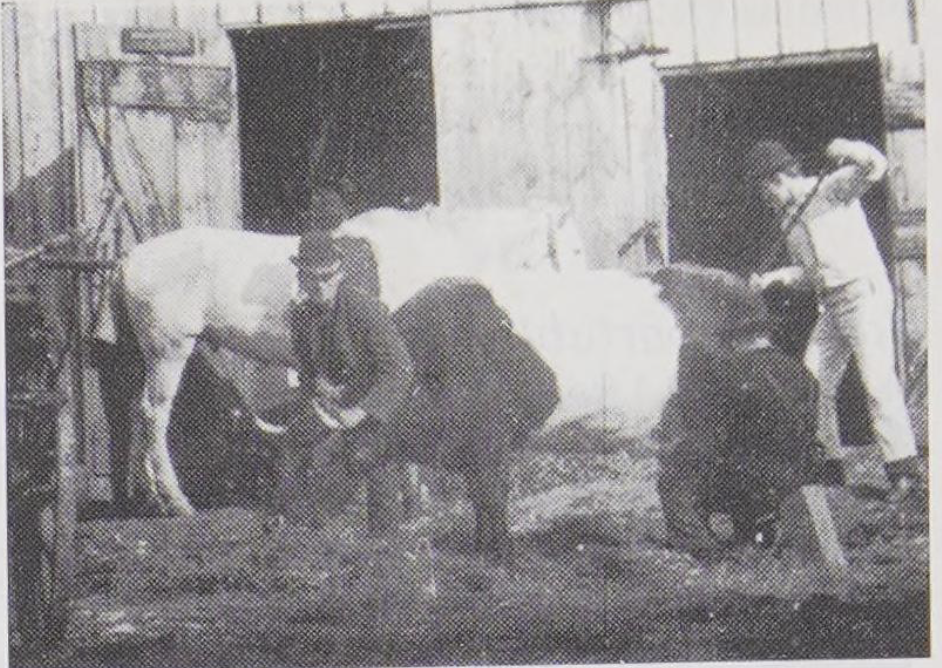
- Directed by: James H. White
- Produced by: Edison Manufacturing Company
- Cinematography: William Heise
- Release date: February 1897
- Country: United States
- Language: Silent film

The Milker's Mishap is a 50-foot 1897 American silent short comedy film. It was sometimes shown with Pillow Fight Between Three Young Ladies, using Edison's projecting kinetoscope. It may have been filmed in Washington, DC, when the Edison camera crew traveled there for McKinley's inauguration, because it was submitted for copyright protection with the Library of Congerss along with two other films, Pile Driving, Washington Navy Yard, and Guard Mount, Ft. Myer.

== Plot ==
The film features a man milking a cow, which becomes frisky and kicks over the milker and the pail of milk. The man blames some farm hands, and a quarrel ensues.

This description comes from an industry catalog in 1898: "A comic subject. Farmer milking a Holstein, which becomes irritated from the work of the farmhands in the barnyard, kicks over the milker and milk pail, and the hands quarrel over the spilt milk. Figures are clear and large."

A third description comes from a book on Edison's films: "A ludicrous subject. Farmer milking a Holstein, which becomes irri tated from the close proximity of a farm hand pitching hay and another currying a horse, kicks over the farmer and pail and makes things lively in general \ waste of good milk, but a very tine and clear subject."
