= Timeline of the second Grover Cleveland presidency =

The second presidency of Grover Cleveland began on March 4, 1893, when Grover Cleveland was inaugurated as the twenty-fourth president of the United States and ended on March 4, 1897, after one term. This followed his first term, which lasted from 1885 to 1889.

== 1893 ==
=== March 1893 ===
- March 4 – Grover Cleveland is inaugurated as the twenty-fourth president of the United States. He calls for greater tariffs, sound currency, and civil service reform. This is the first time a president is inaugurated to a non-consecutive second term. Adlai Stevenson I becomes vice president of the United States.
- March 6 – Walter Q. Gresham, John G. Carlisle, Daniel S. Lamont, Richard Olney, Wilson S. Bissell, Hilary A. Herbert, Hoke Smith, and Julius Sterling Morton become secretary of state, secretary of the treasury, secretary of war, attorney general, postmaster general, secretary of the navy, and secretary of the interior, and secretary of agriculture, respectively.
- March 9 – Cleveland withdraws the treaty to annex Hawaii and asks for Liliʻuokalani to be restored as queen of the Hawaiian Kingdom.
- March 23 – James Graham Jenkins is confirmed to the U.S. Circuit Court for the Seventh Circuit.
- March 27 – Horace Harmon Lurton is confirmed to the U.S. Circuit Court for the Sixth Circuit.

=== April 1893 ===
- April 15 – Richard H. Alvey is confirmed as Chief Justice of the Court of Appeals for the District of Columbia. Martin Ferdinand Morris and Seth Shepard are confirmed as associate justices of the court.
- April 20 – Secretary of the Treasury John G. Carlisle says that banknotes can be redeemed for gold if the treasury "has gold lawfully available for that purpose". This creates public uncertainty, which is cited as a reason for rising interest rates and falling stocks.
- April 22 – The United States gold reserve falls below $100 million for the first time, following the failure of a British bank.
- April 23 – Cleveland calls for the gold standard to be retained.

=== May 1893 ===
- May 1 – The World's Columbian Exposition begins. Cleveland gives the opening address.
- May 4 – The National Cordage Company and the Reading Company go bankrupt, causing the Panic of 1893.
- May 5 – Industrial Black Friday occurs when the stock market declines in New York.

=== June 1893 ===
- June 7 – The United States signs an extradition treaty with Norway.
- June 18 – Cleveland learns that he has oral cancer on the roof of his mouth.
- June 30 – Cleveland issues a proclamation calling for a special session of Congress on August 7 to address Panic of 1893. He asks for Congress to reform tariffs and repeal the silver-purchase law.

=== July 1893 ===
- July 1 – Cleveland receives oral surgery to have a tumor and part of his jaw removed on the yacht Oneida on the East River. The procedure is kept secret from the public and will not be public information until 1917.

=== August 1893 ===
- August – Public speculation spreads about Cleveland's trip on the Oneida where he secretly received oral surgery for a tumor.
- August 7 – The 53rd United States Congress convenes for its first session.
- August 8 – Congress begins its special session on tariffs and silver currency. Cleveland informs members of his Democratic Party that that they must support repealing silver purchase laws or he will reject their patronage requests.
- August 16 – Representative William Jennings Bryan delivers a speech to Congress in favor of a free silver policy.
- August 28 – The silver clauses of the Sherman Antitrust Act are repealed.

=== September 1893 ===
- September 9 – Cleveland's daughter Esther Cleveland becomes the first person to be born in the White House.
- September 16 – Land Run of 1893 begins when seven million acres of land in the Cherokee Outlet is purchased by the federal government for $7 million dollars.
- September 19 – Cleveland nominates William B. Hornblower to the Supreme Court.

=== November 1893 ===
- November 1 – The Sherman Silver Purchase Act is repealed.
- November 3 – The 53rd United States Congress adjourns from its first session.
- November 7 – Colorado holds a referendum that grants women the right to vote.

=== December 1893 ===
- December 4
  - The 53rd United States Congress convenes for its second session.
  - Cleveland delivers the 1893 State of the Union Address. He calls for new tariffs and taxes on corporations.
- December 5 – Cleveland nominates William B. Hornblower to the Supreme Court for a second time after no vote was held on his previous nomination.
- December 19 – Charles Henry Simonton is confirmed to the U.S. Circuit Court for the Fourth Circuit.

== 1894 ==
=== January 1894 ===
- January 15 – The Senate rejects Cleveland's nomination of William H. Hornblower to the Supreme Court.
- January 17 – The federal government put $50 million of treasury bonds up for sale in an unsuccessful attempt to increase the national gold reserve.
- January 22 – Cleveland nominates Wheeler Hazard Peckham to the Supreme Court.

=== February 1894 ===
- February 1 – Tariff reform is implemented.
- February 3 – The United States signs a border agreement with the United Kingdom.
- February 19 – The Senate rejects Cleveland's nomination of Wheeler H. Peckham to the Supreme Court. Cleveland nominates Edward Douglass White to the Supreme Court and White is confirmed the same day.

=== March 1894 ===
- March 17 – The United States signs an immigration treaty with China.
- March 25 – Jacob S. Coxey Sr. and Coxey's Army begin their march from Massillon, Ohio, to Washington, D.C. in protest of unemployment.

=== April 1894 ===
- April 29 – Coxey's Army reaches Washington, D.C. and are arrested for trespassing.

=== May 1894 ===
- May 4 – The United States signs a treaty on fur seal fisheries with the Russian Empire.
- May 11 – The Pullman Strike begins. American Railway Union president Eugene V. Debs leads the strike against George Pullman and the Pullman Company in Pullman, Illinois. They are protesting lowered wages and the company's practice of forcing workers to live in expensive company-owned towns. The strike will spread across the western United States and halt rail travel in much of the country.

=== June 1894 ===
- June 28 – Labor Day becomes a national holiday following the growing labor movement in the United States.

=== July 1894 ===
- July 4 – The Provisional Government of Hawaii is succeeded by the Republic of Hawaii. The constitution permits annexation into the United States.
- July 8 – Cleveland issues a proclamation sending soldiers to enforce an injunction breaking up the Pullman Strike in Illinois. The federal government became involved after the operations of the United States Post Office Department were interrupted. Strike leader Eugene V. Debs is arrested.

=== August 1894 ===
- August 8 – The United States recognizes the Republic of Hawaii.
- August 9 – Amos Madden Thayer is confirmed to the U.S. Circuit Court for the Eighth Circuit.
- August 24 – The United States signs an agreement with Mexico on a boundary line west of the Rio Grande.
- August 28
  - The Wilson–Gorman Tariff Act sets income taxes on individuals and corporations. Cleveland refuses to sign the bill but does not veto it, and it passes into law.
  - The 53rd United States Congress adjourns from its second session.

=== September 1894 ===
- September 25 – Cleveland pardons Mormons who illegally practice polygamy.

=== November 1894 ===
- November 6 – The 1894 United States elections take place. The Democratic Party loses control of both chambers of Congress.
- November 9 – A second attempt to sell treasury bonds is unsuccessful in restoring the national gold reserve.
- November 22 – The United States signs a treaty of commerce and navigation with Japan.

=== December 1894 ===
- December 1 – The United States asserts authority in a border dispute between the United Kingdom and Venezuela and begins an arbitration process.
- December 3
  - The 53rd United States Congress convenes for its third session.
  - Cleveland delivers the 1894 State of the Union Address.

== 1895 ==
=== January 1895 ===
- January 10 – The United States signs a treaty with Spain on commercial relations with respect to Cuba and Puerto Rico.
- January 28 – Cleveland asks Congress to take carry out a stalled plan for the economy that had been proposed in the State of the Union address.

=== February 1895 ===
- February 8
  - A third attempt to sell treasury bonds is successful in restoring the national gold reserve. J. P. Morgan is the primary buyer, purchasing bonds with $62 million of gold.
  - Cleveland issues a proclamation banning fur-hunting in Alaska.
- February 22 – Erskine Mayo Ross is confirmed to the U.S. Circuit Court for the Sixth Circuit.
- February 24 – The Cuban War of Independence begins between Cuba and Spain. The United States remains neutral but the public generally supports the rebels.

=== March 1895 ===
- March 1
  - William Lyne Wilson succeeds Wilson S. Bissell as postmaster general.
  - John William Showalter is confirmed to the U.S. Circuit Court for the Seventh Circuit.
- March 5 – The 53rd United States Congress adjourns from its third session.

=== May 1895 ===
- May 20 – The Supreme Court issues its decision in Pollock v. Farmers' Loan & Trust Co.. It rules that income taxes are unconstitutional and nullifies the income taxes levied by the Wilson-Gorman Tariff Act.
- May 27 – The Supreme Court issues its decision in In re Debs. It rules that the federal government has the power to enforce injunctions against impediments of federal government activity. It finds that the government was legally justified in ending the Pullman Strike and arresting Eugene V. Debs.
- May 28 – Secretary of State Walter Q. Gresham dies.

=== June 1895 ===
- June 8 – Attorney General Richard Olney becomes secretary of state, filling the vacancy left by Walter Q. Gresham. Judson Harmon succeeds Olney as attorney general.
- June 12 – Cleveland issues a proclamation declaring neutrality in the Cuban War of Independence but expressing sympathy for the Cuban rebels.

=== July 1895 ===
- July 6 – The United States signs a copyright treaty with Spain.
- July 7 – Cleveland's daughter Marion Cleveland is born at Cleveland's home Gray Gables in Massachusetts.

=== September 1895 ===
- September 1 – David R. Francis succeeds Hoke Smith as secretary of agriculture.

=== October 1895 ===
- October 1 – The United States signs a border agreement with Mexico for the Rio Grande and the Rio Colorado.
- October 2 – The United States signs an agreement with Denmark for exemption of vessels from measurement.
- October 9 – The United States signs a treaty signs a treaty with the United Kingdom regarding trademarks in Morocco.

=== December 1895 ===
- December 2
  - The 54th United States Congress convenes for its first session.
  - Cleveland delivers the 1895 State of the Union Address.
- December 3 – Cleveland nominates Rufus W. Peckham to the Supreme Court.
- December 9 – Rufus W. Peckham is confirmed to the Supreme Court.

== 1896 ==
=== January 1896 ===
- January 4 – Utah becomes the forty-fifth state.
- January 6 – A fourth sale of treasury bonds is carried out to restore the national gold reserve but significantly increases the national debt.

=== April 1896 ===
- April 25 – Cleveland vetoes a bill that would grant a pension to veteran Frances E. Hoover. He says that Hoover's medical condition is unrelated to his military service.

=== May 1896 ===
- May 18 – The Supreme Court issues its decision in Plessy v. Ferguson. It rules that states can pass racial segregation laws under a system of separate but equal.
- May 19 – Cleveland vetoes a bill that would grant a pension to Caroline D. Mowatt, a veteran's widow. He says she is ineligible because she remarried.
- May 21 – Cleveland vetoes a bill that would grant a pension to Rachel Patton, a veteran's widow. He says that she is ineligible because she remarried.
- May 29 – Cleveland vetoes a bill that would fund construction and maintenance for public works on rivers.

=== June 1896 ===
- June 3 – Congress overrides Cleveland's veto of a bill that would fund construction and maintenance for public works on rivers.
- June 4 – The United States signs an agreement with Mexico on the right to pursue Indians across boundary lines.
- June 10 – Congress overrides Cleveland's veto on a bill to provide a pension to veteran Frances E. Hoover.
- June 11 – The 54th United States Congress adjourns from its first session.
- June 18 – The 1896 Republican National Convention selects William McKinley as the Republican Party's presidential nominee. The party adopts a platform supporting the gold standard.

=== July 1896 ===
- July 11 – The 1896 Democratic National Convention selects former representative William Jennings Bryan as the Democratic Party's presidential nominee. During the convention, Bryan delivers his Cross of Gold speech. The party adopts a platform supporting the silver standard.

=== August 1896 ===
- August 7 – The Gold Democrats form in Indianapolis as a faction of the Democratic Party that supports the gold standard.

=== September 1896 ===
- September 3 – Cleveland declines to be a third-party presidential candidate for the Gold Democrats.
- September 26 – The United States signs an extradition treaty with Argentina.

=== October 1896 ===
- October 28 – The United States signs an extradition treaty with the Orange Free State.

=== November 1896 ===
- November 3 – The 1896 United States elections take place. William McKinley wins the presidential election with 271 electoral votes to William Jennings Bryan's 176.
- November 6 – The United States signs a border agreement with Mexico for the Rio Grande and the Rio Colorado.
- November 11 – Cleveland issues a proclamation protecting Greek Oriental Church land in Sitka, Alaska, from withdrawal.
- November 23 – Cleveland appoints Charles Bowen Howry and Charles C. Nott to the U.S. Court of Claims as recess appointments.

=== December 1896 ===
- December 7
  - The 54th United States Congress convenes for its second session.
  - Cleveland delivers the 1896 State of the Union Address. He says the United States has an interest in the Cuban rebellion against Spain and that the United States may have to take action to prevent the island's destruction.
- December 15 – Cleveland's recess appointment Charles C. Nott is confirmed to the U.S. Court of Claims.

== 1897 ==
=== January 1897 ===
- January 11 – The United Kingdom and the United States reach an agreement on the United Kingdom's border dispute with Venezuela.
- January 13 – The United States signs a treaty of patents, trademarks, and designs with Japan.
- January 14 – Cleveland vetoes a bill that would create a new judicial district around Beaumont, Texas.
- January 28 – Cleveland's recess appointment Charles Bowen Howry is confirmed to the U.S. Court of Claims.

=== February 1897 ===
- February 8 – Congress overrides Cleveland's veto of a new judicial district in Texas.
- February 9 – Cleveland vetoes a ban on admitting illiterate immigrants to the United States.
- February 11 – Settlers are authorized to claim rights to petroleum on the lands they settle.
- February 22 – Cleveland creates 13 national forest reserves, nearly tripling the area of existing forest reserves.
- February 24 – Cleveland issues a proclamation calling for a special session of the Senate.

=== March 1897 ===
- March 2 – Cleveland vetoes a bill that would ban admitting illiterate immigrants to the United States.
- March 3
  - Congress overrides Cleveland's May 1896 vetoes of pension for veterans' widows Caroline D. Mowatt and Rachel Patton.
  - The 54th United States Congress adjourns from its second session.
- March 4
  - Cleveland pocket vetoes a bill that would fund the government. It includes a provision that would abolish the 13 national forest reserves that Cleveland created on February 22.
  - Cleveland's term ends and William McKinley is inaugurated as the twenty-fifth president of the United States.

== See also ==
- Timeline of the first Grover Cleveland presidency

== Works cited ==
- Bevans, Charles I. (1968). Treaties and Other International Agreements of the United States of America, 1776-1949. United States Department of State.
