= Timelines of the Grover Cleveland presidencies =

Grover Cleveland was the twenty-second and twenty-fourth president of the United States.

- Timeline of the first Grover Cleveland presidency (1885–1889)
- Timeline of the second Grover Cleveland presidency (1893–1897)
