= Presidential transition of Grover Cleveland =

Presidential transition of Grover Cleveland may refer to:

- First presidential transition of Grover Cleveland (1884–1885)
- Second presidential transition of Grover Cleveland (1892–1893)
