= Cabinet of Grover Cleveland =

Cabinet of Grover Cleveland may refer to:

- First cabinet of Grover Cleveland (1885–1889)
- Second cabinet of Grover Cleveland (1893–1897)
