= United States Joint Congressional Committee on Inaugural Ceremonies =

Presidential inauguration management group

A Joint Committee on Inaugural Ceremonies is a special joint committee of the United States Congress formed every four years to manage the presidential inaugurations. Such committee has been formed every four years since the 1901 inauguration of William McKinley.

The members are sitting U.S. senators and representatives. Typically, the House members include the speaker of the House as well as the House majority and minority leaders. The Senate members are drawn from the leadership of the Senate Committee on Rules and Administration (previously known by other names). A senator acts as chair, and is therefore drawn from the majority party of the Senate. Membership in the committee gives its members the opportunity to control tickets to the inauguration ceremonies as well as other electoral-related ceremonies.

== 1901 committee ==
	Majority	Minority
Senate members	Mark Hanna, Ohio, Chair; John Coit Spooner, Wisconsin	James Kimbrough Jones, Arkansas
House members	Joseph Gurney Cannon, Illinois; John Dalzell, Pennsylvania	Thomas Chipman McRae, Arkansas

== 1905 committee ==
	Majority	Minority
Senate members	John Coit Spooner, Wisconsin, Chair; Nelson W. Aldrich, Rhode Island	Augustus Octavius Bacon, Georgia
House members	John Dalzell, Pennsylvania; Edgar D. Crumpacker, Indiana	John Sharp Williams, Mississippi

== 1909 committee ==
	Majority	Minority
Senate members	Philander C. Knox, Pennsylvania, Chair; Henry Cabot Lodge, Massachusetts	Augustus Octavius Bacon, Georgia
House members	James F. Burke, Pennsylvania; Olin Young, Michigan	John W. Gaines, Tennessee

== 1913 committee ==
	Majority	Minority
Senate members	Winthrop M. Crane, Massachusetts, Chair	Augustus Octavius Bacon, Georgia; Lee Slater Overman, North Carolina
House members	William W. Rucker, Missouri; Finis J. Garrett, Tennessee	William B. McKinley, Illinois

== 1917 committee ==
	Majority	Minority
Senate members	Lee Slater Overman, North Carolina, Chair; M. Hoke Smith, Georgia	Francis E. Warren, Wyoming
House members	William W. Rucker, Missouri; Finis J. Garrett, Tennessee	William B. McKinley, Illinois

== 1921 committee ==
	Majority	Minority
Senate members	Philander C. Knox, Pennsylvania, Chair; Knute Nelson, Minnesota	Lee Slater Overman, North Carolina
House members	Joseph Gurney Cannon, Illinois; Frank Reavis, Nebraska	William W. Rucker, Missouri (Resigned); Charles Manly Stedman, North Carolina

== 1925 committee ==
	Majority	Minority
Senate members	Charles Curtis, Kansas, Chair; Frederick Hale, Maine	Lee Slater Overman, North Carolina
House members	William Walton Griest, Pennsylvania; Lindley H. Hadley, Washington	Arthur B. Rouse, Kentucky

== 1929 committee ==
	Majority	Minority
Senate members	George H. Moses, New Hampshire, Chair; Frederick Hale, Maine	Lee Slater Overman, North Carolina
House members	Bertrand Snell, New York; Leonidas C. Dyer, Missouri	Edward W. Pou, North Carolina

== 1933 committee ==
	Majority	Minority
Senate members	Joseph Taylor Robinson, Arkansas, Chair	George H. Moses, New Hampshire; Frederick Hale, Maine
House members	Edward W. Pou, North Carolina; Henry Rainey, Illinois	Bertrand Snell, New York

== 1937 committee ==
	Majority	Minority
Senate members	Matthew M. Neely, West Virginia, Chair; Joseph Taylor Robinson, Arkansas	Frederick Hale, Maine
House members	John O'Connor, New York; Robert L. Doughton, North Carolina	Bertrand Snell, New York

== 1941 committee ==
	Majority	Minority
Senate members	Matthew M. Neely, West Virginia, Chair; Alben W. Barkley, Kentucky	Charles L. McNary, Oregon
House members	Sam Rayburn, Texas; Robert L. Doughton, North Carolina	Joseph W. Martin Jr., Massachusetts

== 1945 committee ==
	Majority	Minority
Senate members	Harry F. Byrd, Virginia, Chair; Kenneth McKellar, Tennessee	Arthur Vandenberg, Michigan
House members	Sam Rayburn, Texas; Robert L. Doughton, North Carolina	Joseph W. Martin Jr., Massachusetts

== 1949 committee ==
	Majority	Minority
Senate members	Alben W. Barkley, Kentucky, Chair (Resigned to become Vice President); Carl Hayden, Arizona, Chair; J. Howard McGrath, Rhode Island (Replaced Brooks)	Kenneth S. Wherry, Nebraska; Charles W. Brooks, Illinois (lost reelection)
House members	Harry R. Sheppard, California (Replaced Arends); John W. McCormack, Massachusetts	Charles A. Halleck, Indiana; Leslie C. Arends, Illinois (Resigned)

== 1953 committee ==
	Majority	Minority
Senate members	Styles Bridges, New Hampshire, Chair; Margaret Chase Smith, Maine (Replaced McFarland, lost reelection); Herman Welker, Idaho	Carl Hayden, Arizona; Ernest McFarland, Arizona (lost reelection)
House members	Leslie C. Arends, Illinois (Replaced McCormack); Joseph W. Martin Jr., Massachusetts	Sam Rayburn, Texas; John W. McCormack, Massachusetts (Resigned)

== 1957 committee ==
	Majority	Minority
Senate members	Styles Bridges, New Hampshire, Chair	John Sparkman, Alabama; Theodore F. Green, Rhode Island
House members	Joseph W. Martin Jr., Massachusetts	Sam Rayburn, Texas; John W. McCormack, Massachusetts

== 1961 committee ==
	Majority	Minority
Senate members	John Sparkman, Alabama, Chair; Thomas C. Hennings Jr., Missouri (Deceased September 13, 1960); Carl Hayden, Arizona	Styles Bridges, New Hampshire
House members	Sam Rayburn, Texas; John W. McCormack, Massachusetts	Charles A. Halleck, Indiana

== 1965 committee ==
	Majority	Minority
Senate members	B. Everett Jordan, North Carolina, Chair; John Sparkman, Alabama	Leverett Saltonstall, Massachusetts
House members	John W. McCormack, Massachusetts; Carl Albert, Oklahoma	Charles A. Halleck, Indiana

== 1969 committee ==
	Majority	Minority
Senate members	Everett Dirksen, Illinois, Chair	B. Everett Jordan, North Carolina; Mike Mansfield, Montana
House members	Gerald Ford, Michigan	John W. McCormack, Massachusetts; Carl Albert, Oklahoma

== 1973 committee ==
	Majority	Minority
Senate members	B. Everett Jordan, North Carolina, Chair (defeated in 1972 Senate primary); Howard Cannon, Nevada, Chair; Mike Mansfield, Montana	Marlow Cook, Kentucky
House members	Carl Albert, Oklahoma; Hale Boggs, Louisiana (Deceased October 16, 1972); Tip O'Neill, Massachusetts	Gerald Ford, Michigan

== 1977 committee ==
	Majority	Minority
Senate members	Howard Cannon, Nevada, Chair; Robert Byrd, West Virginia	Mark Hatfield, Oregon
House members	Tip O'Neill, Massachusetts; Jim Wright, Texas	John Jacob Rhodes, Arizona

== 1981 committee ==
	Majority	Minority
Senate members	Mark Hatfield, Oregon, Chair; Howard Baker, Tennessee	Robert Byrd, West Virginia; Claiborne Pell, Rhode Island
House members	Tip O'Neill, Massachusetts; Jim Wright, Texas	John Jacob Rhodes, Arizona; Robert H. Michel, Illinois

== 1985 committee ==
	Majority	Minority
Senate members	Charles Mathias, Maryland, Chair; Howard Baker, Tennessee (until January 3, 1985); Bob Dole, Kansas (from January 3, 1985)	Wendell Ford, Kentucky
House members	Tip O'Neill, Massachusetts; Jim Wright, Texas	Robert H. Michel, Illinois

== 1989 committee ==
	Majority	Minority
Senate members	Wendell Ford, Kentucky, Chair; Robert Byrd, West Virginia	Ted Stevens, Alaska
House members	Jim Wright, Texas; Tom Foley, Washington	Robert H. Michel, Illinois

== 1993 committee ==
	Majority	Minority
Senate members	Wendell Ford, Kentucky, Chair; George J. Mitchell, Maine	Ted Stevens, Alaska
House members	Tom Foley, Washington; Dick Gephardt, Missouri	Robert H. Michel, Illinois

== 1997 committee ==
	Majority	Minority
Senate members	John Warner, Virginia, Chair; Trent Lott, Mississippi	Wendell Ford, Kentucky
House members	Newt Gingrich, Georgia; Dick Armey, Texas	Dick Gephardt, Missouri

== 2001 committee ==
	Majority	Minority
Senate members	Mitch McConnell, Kentucky, Chair; Trent Lott, Mississippi	Chris Dodd, Connecticut
House members	Dennis Hastert, Illinois; Dick Armey, Texas	Dick Gephardt, Missouri

== 2005 committee ==
	Majority	Minority
Senate members	Trent Lott, Mississippi, Chair; Bill Frist, Tennessee	Chris Dodd, Connecticut
House members	Dennis Hastert, Illinois; Tom DeLay, Texas	Nancy Pelosi, California

== 2009 committee ==
	Majority	Minority
Senate members	Dianne Feinstein, California, Chair; Harry Reid, Nevada	Bob Bennett, Utah
House members	Nancy Pelosi, California; Steny Hoyer, Maryland	John Boehner, Ohio

== 2013 committee ==
	Majority	Minority
Senate members	Chuck Schumer, New York, Chair; Harry Reid, Nevada	Lamar Alexander, Tennessee
House members	John Boehner, Ohio; Eric Cantor, Virginia	Nancy Pelosi, California

== 2017 committee ==
	Majority	Minority
Senate members	Roy Blunt, Missouri, Chair; Mitch McConnell, Kentucky	Chuck Schumer, New York
House members	Paul Ryan, Wisconsin; Kevin McCarthy, California	Nancy Pelosi, California

== 2021 committee ==
	Majority	Minority
Senate members	Roy Blunt, Missouri, Chair; Mitch McConnell, Kentucky	Amy Klobuchar, Minnesota
House members	Nancy Pelosi, California; Steny Hoyer, Maryland	Kevin McCarthy, California

== 2025 committee ==
	Majority	Minority
Senate members	Amy Klobuchar, Minnesota, Chair; Chuck Schumer, New York	Deb Fischer, Nebraska
House members	Mike Johnson, Louisiana; Steve Scalise, Louisiana	Hakeem Jeffries, New York

== See also ==
- Senate Rules Committee
