= Inauguration of William McKinley =

Inauguration of William McKinley may refer to:

- First inauguration of William McKinley, 1897
- Second inauguration of William McKinley, 1901

== See also ==
- The full text of William McKinley's First Inaugural Address at Wikisource
- The full text of William McKinley's Second Inaugural Address at Wikisource
