= President McKinley Inauguration Footage =

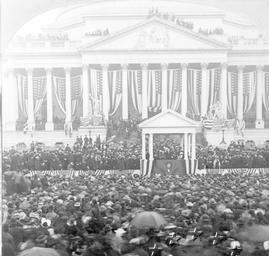
- Produced by: Edison Manufacturing Company
- Starring: William McKinley
- Cinematography: attributed to Edwin S. Porter and James H. White
- Release date: March 16, 1901
- Country: United States
- Language: Silent film

President McKinley Inauguration Footage is the name given to two different short documentary films which were combined as one. The two titles are President McKinley Taking the Oath and President McKinley and Escort Going to the Capitol. The two show President William McKinley arriving at the United States Capitol in order to take the oath of office of the president of the United States as part of his second inauguration on March 4, 1901.

Both were produced by the Edison Manufacturing Company, and in 2000 the United States Library of Congress deemed the two "culturally significant" and selected them for preservation in the National Film Registry.

== Production ==
President McKinley Taking the Oath

Edison's crew shot the films on location on March 4, 1901, and released their footage less than two weeks later. The notes stated they had a camera and were "within twenty feet of the President's carriage when it passed," giving the general public an unprecedentedly intimate view of a United States president. The crew captured their images on several campers placed on rudimentary tripods that made it difficult to pan or tilt while filming.

The cinematography is believed to have been the responsibility of Edwin S. Porter and James H. White.

President McKinley and escort going to the Capitol (1901)

== Release ==
Press accounts described the film receiving "great applause" and causing "pandemonium" during its screenings.

== See also ==
- Inauguration of the Commonwealth, another early film (released January 1901) showing a national leader being sworn in.
