= First inauguration of William McKinley =

28th United States presidential inauguration

First presidential inauguration of William McKinley
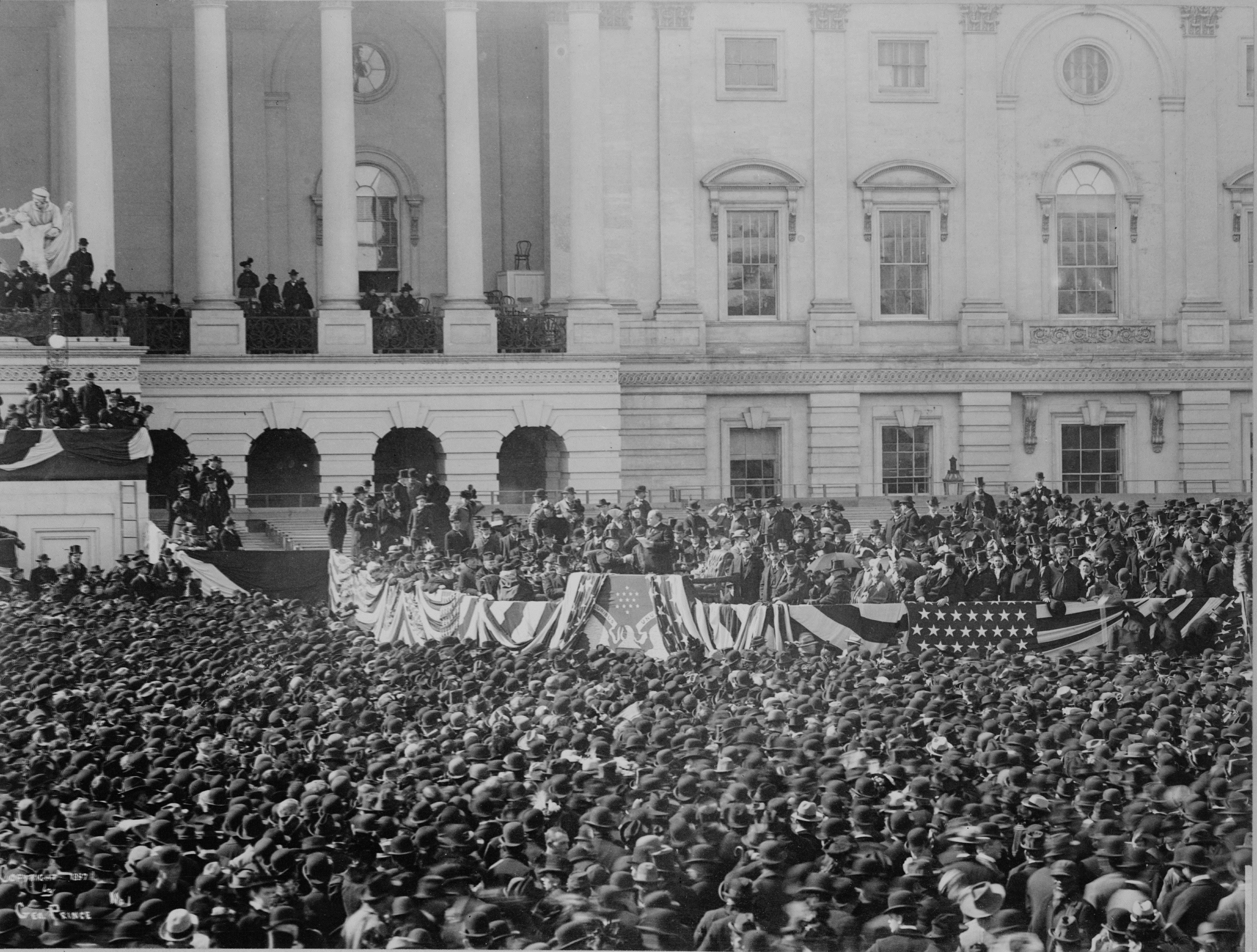
- Date: March 4, 1897; 129 years ago
- Location: United States Capitol, Washington, D.C.
- Participants: William McKinley; 25th president of the United States — Assuming office Melville Fuller; Chief Justice of the United States — Administering oath Garret Hobart; 24th vice president of the United States — Assuming office Adlai Stevenson I 23rd vice president of the United States — Administering oath

The first inauguration of William McKinley as the 25th president of the United States took place on Thursday, March 4, 1897, in front of the Old Senate Chamber at the United States Capitol, Washington, D.C. This was the 28th inauguration and marked the commencement of the first and eventually only full term of William McKinley as president and the only term of Garret Hobart as vice president. Chief Justice Melville Fuller administered the presidential oath of office. This was the first inauguration to be recorded on film, and was the last presidential inauguration to take place in the 19th century. Hobart died 2 years, 262 days into this term, and the office remained vacant since there was no constitutional provision which allow an intra-term vice-presidential office filling; it would be regulated by the Twenty-fifth Amendment in 1967.

== Gallery ==
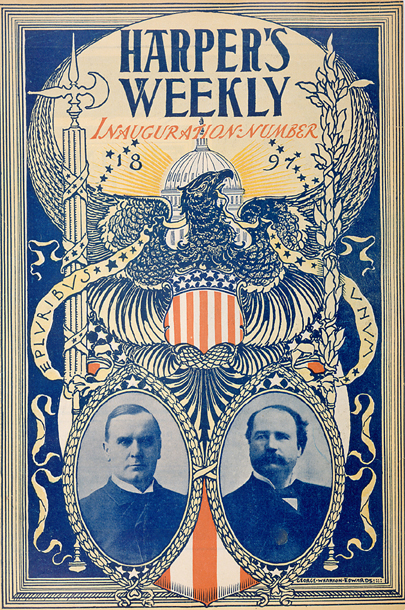
Inaugural pamphlet from the occasion

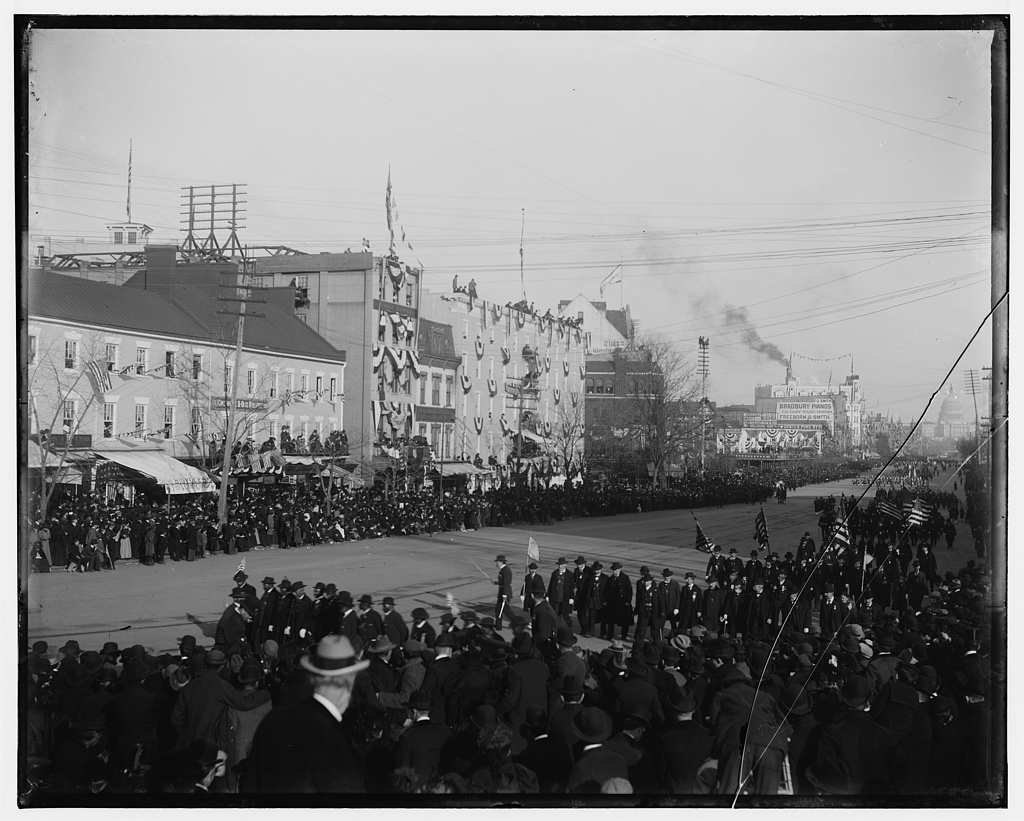
McKinley, Pres. Wm. Inaugural parade 1897

== See also ==
- Presidency of William McKinley
- Second inauguration of William McKinley
- 1896 United States presidential election
