= Second inauguration of William McKinley =

29th United States presidential inauguration

Second presidential inauguration of William McKinley
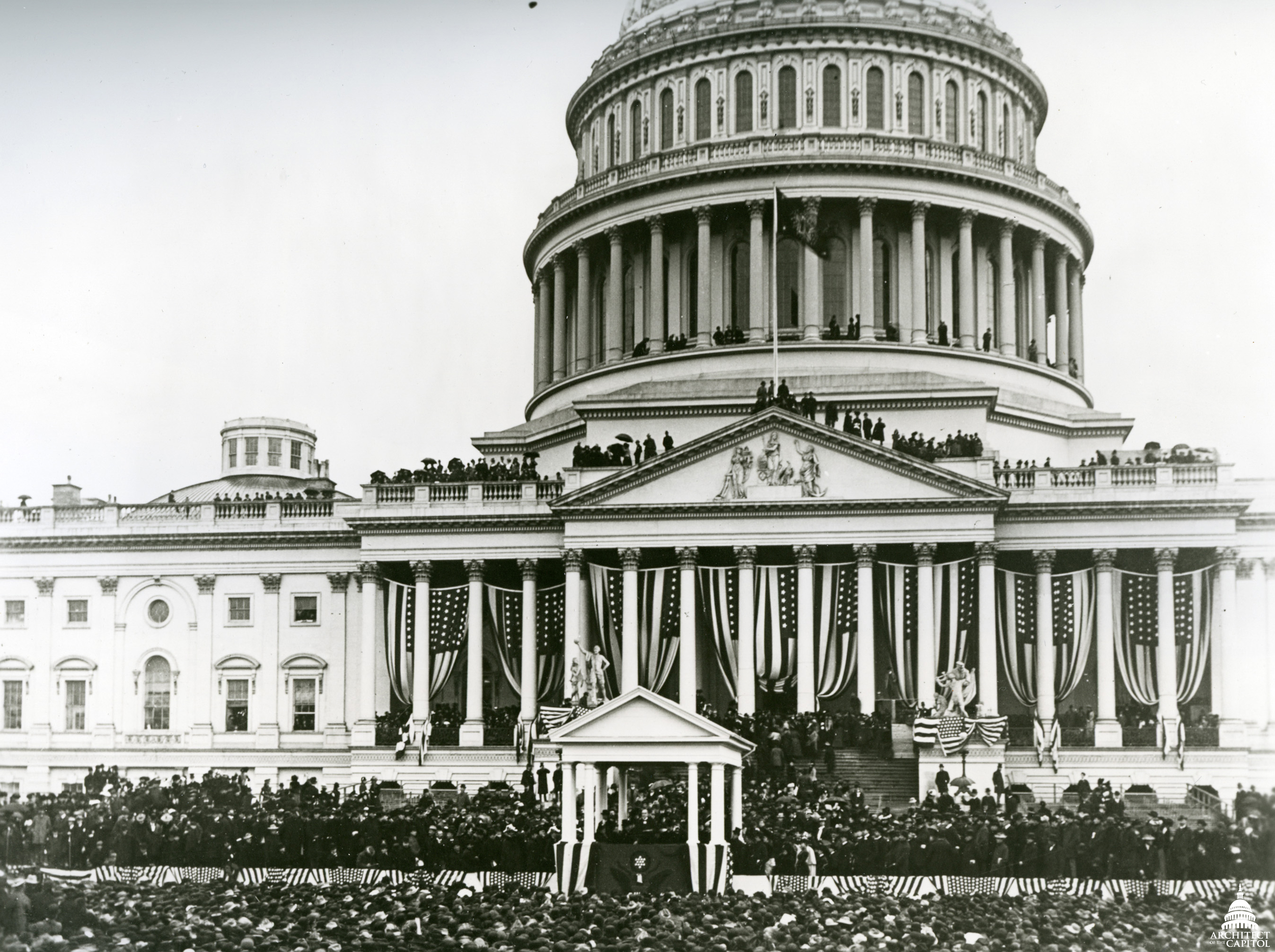
- Date: March 4, 1901; 125 years ago
- Location: United States Capitol, Washington, D.C.
- Organized by: Joint Congressional Committee on Inaugural Ceremonies
- Participants: William McKinley; 25th president of the United States — Assuming office Melville Fuller; Chief Justice of the United States — Administering oath Theodore Roosevelt; 25th vice president of the United States — Assuming office William P. Frye; President pro tempore of the United States Senate — Administering oath

The second inauguration of William McKinley as president of the United States was held on Monday, March 4, 1901, at the East Portico of the United States Capitol in Washington, D.C. This was the 29th inauguration and marked the commencement of the second and final term of William McKinley as president and the only term of Theodore Roosevelt as vice president. McKinley was assassinated 194 days into this term, and Roosevelt succeeded to the presidency.

Chief Justice Melville Fuller administered the oath of office. This was the first inauguration to take place in the 20th century. This was also the first inauguration to be arranged by the Joint Committee on Inaugural Ceremonies and organized by both the House of Representatives and the Senate.

== Gallery ==
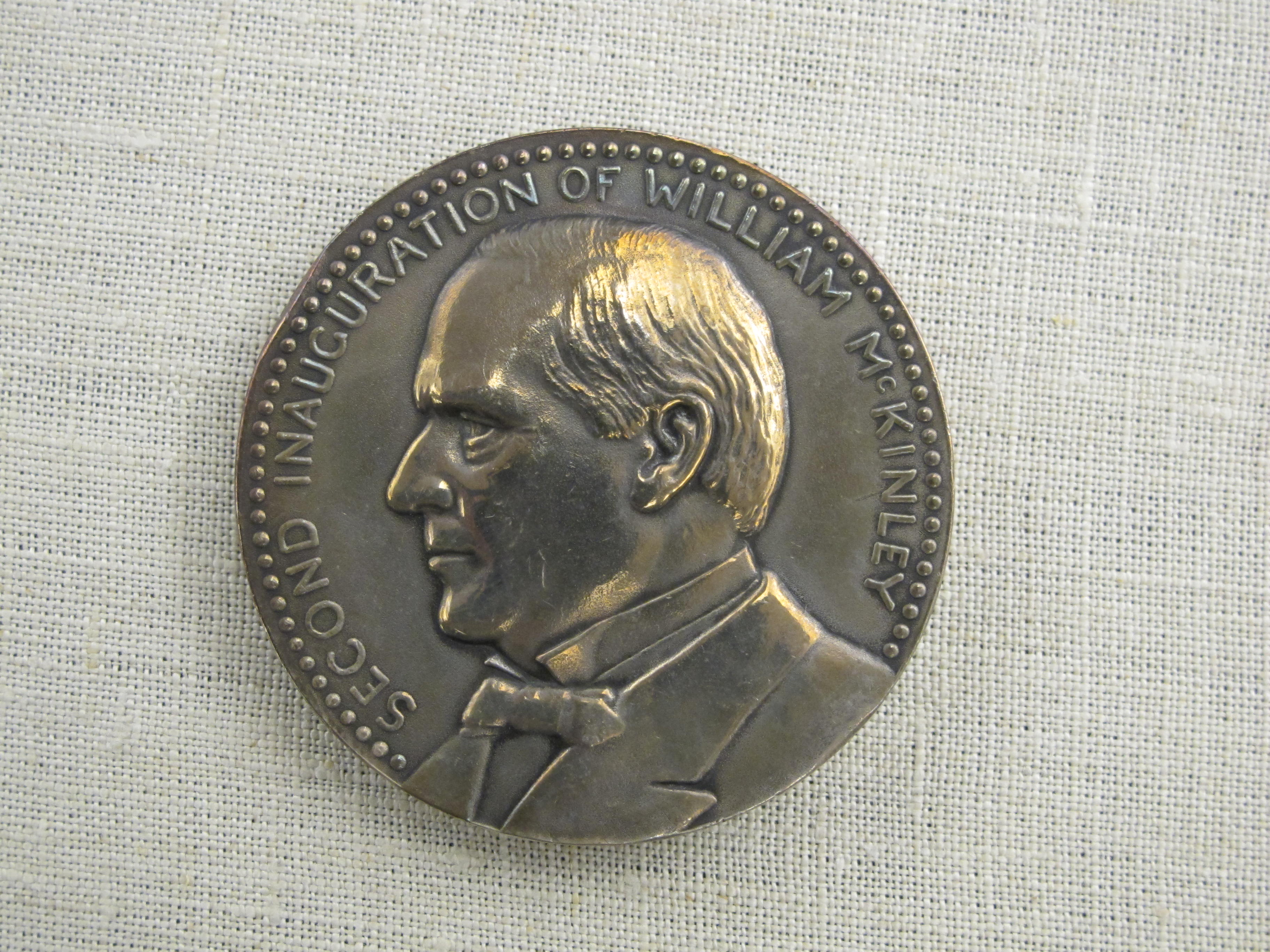
1901 Bronze Presidential Medal for McKinley.

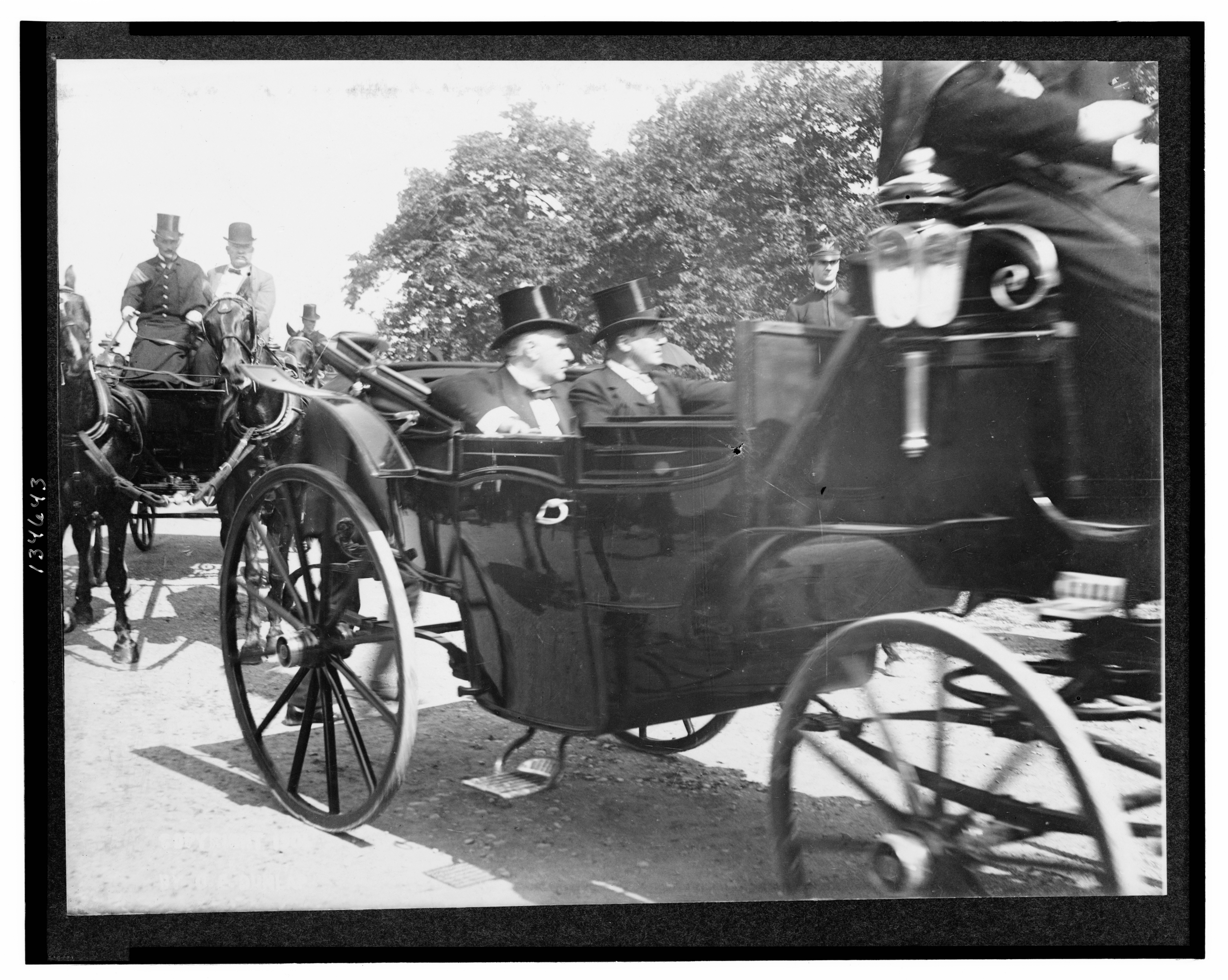
William McKinley and another man seated in a carriage enroute to or from the U.S. Capitol on the day of his inauguration

== See also ==
- Presidency of William McKinley
- First inauguration of William McKinley
- 1900 United States presidential election
- President McKinley Inauguration Footage
