= James H. White =

Canadian actor and director

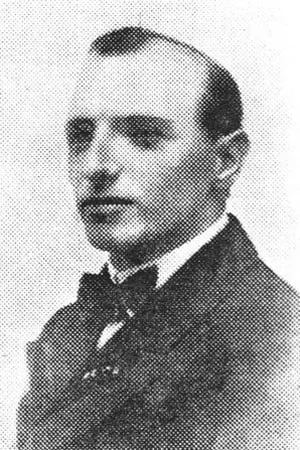
- circa 1900
- Born: James Henry White; March 1872; Nova Scotia, Canada
- Died: 1944 (aged 71–72)
- Occupations: Film director, actor
- Years active: 1894-1902
- Spouse: Pauline A. Dede (m. 1902)

James Henry White (March 1872 – 1944) was a Canadian film pioneer, who worked as a director, producer, and cinematographer. He also appeared as an actor in several films. He was employed by the Edison Manufacturing Company as Production Head from 1896 to 1902, and directed over 500 short films, both fictional and documentary often with no functional story or script, just scenes or vignettes. White proved prolific and tried to be lyrical in some of his short films, for example Return of a Lifeboat (1897) and A Storm at Sea (1900) the latter of which was shot on a passenger ship with the camera catching some of the glimmer from the sun.

== Biography ==
James H. White was born in Nova Scotia in March 1872. He married Pauline Dede on November 29, 1902.

He died in 1944.

== Career ==
Various of his films are extant. The 1896 film T. A. Edison by Blackton features a cartoonist drawing Thomas Alva Edison. His 1896 film Watermelon Eating Contest features two African American men seated and devouring large slices of watermelon. His 1898 film Indian Day School is set at what a sign in the film says is the Isleta Indian School in New Mexico. Fifth Avenue, New York and Sunday Morning in Mexico show pedestrians passing by. He filmed rapids from a passing train. He filmed aboard a ship in Newport. He filmed along the Seine River.

He filmed a washing room prank. He filmed a Boer cavalry charge and "Rough Riders" in action. He filmed bears dressed up and performing.

== Filmography ==
=== 1896 ===
- Watermelon Contest
- Interrupted Lover
- Going to the Fire
- Lone Fisherman
- Edison Drawn by World Artist
- Mess Call
- Irish Way of Discussing Politics
- Little Egypt
- Herald Square
- Fatima's Coochee-Coochee Dance
- The Bad Boy and the Gardener
- Sea Beach Scene
- Scene on Surf Ave., Coney Island
- Shooting the Chutes
- Passaic Falls, New Jersey
- Feeding the Doves
- A Morning Bath
- The Burning Stable
- Mounted Police Charge
- A Morning Alarm
- Black Diamond Express
- American Falls from Above, American Side

=== 1897 ===
- Serpentine Dance - Annabelle
- The First Sleigh-Ride
- Chicken Thieves
- Police Patrol Wagon
- Fifth Avenue, New York
- Seminary Girls
- Black Diamond Express, No. 1
- Husking Bee
- Mr. Edison at Work in His Chemical Laboratory
- Giant Coal Dumper
- Armour's Electric Trolley
- Philadelphia Express, Jersey Central Railway
- Free-for-All Race at Charter Oak Park
- Corner Madison & State Streets, Chicago
- Buffalo Police on Parade
- Buffalo Stockyards
- Sheep Run, Chicago Stockyards
- Falls of Minnehaha
- Cattle Driven to Slaughter
- Sutro Baths, No. 2
- Cupid and Psyche
- Arrest in Chinatown, San Francisco, Cal.
- Capsize of Lifeboat
- Leander Sisters
- S.S. Coptic Sailing Away
- Return of the Lifeboat
- First Avenue, Seattle, Washington, No. 8
- The Sea Lions' Home
- Boxing for Points
- Sutro Baths, No. 1
- Lurline Baths
- Surf at Monterey
- Buffalo Fire Dept. in Action
- Fisherman's Wharf
- Stanford University, California
- Hotel Del Monte
- Launch of Life Boat
- Horses Loading for the Klondike
- Fishing Smacks
- Lick Observatory, Mt. Hamilton, Cal.
- S.S. Queen Leaving Dock
- Loading Baggage for Klondike
- S.S. Williamette Leaving for Klondike
- S.S. Coptic at Dock
- S.S. Coptic in the Harbor
- Hotel Vendom, San Jose, Cal.
- Southern Pacific Overland Mall
- Boat Wagon and Beach Cart
- S.S. Queen Loading
- Fast Mail, Northern Pacific Railroad

=== 1898 ===
- Ella Lola, a la Trilby
- Sunday Morning in Mexico
- Japanese Sampans
- Ostriches Running, No. 1
- Mexican Rurales Charge
- Street Scene, San Diego
- Chinese Procession
- Eagle Dance, Pueblo Indians
- Wash Day in Mexico
- Going Through the Tunnel
- Indian Day School
- South Spring Street, Los Angeles, Cal.
- Sunset Limited, Southern Pacific Ry.
- Calf Branding
- Cattle Leaving the Corral
- California Limited, A.T. & S.F.R.R.
- Lassoing a Steer
- Mount Tamalpais R.R., No. 1
- Bull Fight, No. 3
- After Launching
- Parade of Chinese
- Mount Tamalpais R.R., No. 2
- Freight Train
- Launch of Japanese Man-of-War Chitosa
- Native Daughters
- Union Iron Works
- Procession of Floats
- Launching No. 2
- S.S. Coptic Running Against the Storm
- Mount Taw R.R., No. 3
- Troops Embarking at San Francisco
- Troop Ships for the Philippines
- Kanakas Diving for Money (Honolulu), No. 2
- Shooting Captured Insurgents
- Cuban Ambush
- Victorious Squadron Firing Salute
- Farmer Kissing the Lean Girl
- Statue of Liberty
- Close View of the Brooklyn Naval Parade
- The Fleet Steaming Up North River
- Observation Train Following Parade
- Reviewing the Texas at Grant's Tomb
- Turkish Dance, Ella Lola
- Fighting the Fire

=== 1901 ===
- President McKinley Inauguration Footage (attributed)

== Films shot in Hong Kong ==
In 1898, the Edison Company sent White to China, after which he travelled to Japan. In February of that year, he sailed from Yokohama to Hong Kong. Fourteen of White's films can be found in Hong Kong Film Archive, where six of them were shot in Hong Kong and all exactly one reel in length. These films captures the everyday life of the Hong Kong people and are important records. They are:

- The Sikh Artillery, Hong Kong – Indian regiment conducting artillery drills
- Street Scene in Hong Kong – China Town in Sheung Wan
- Hong Kong Wharf Scene
- Hong Kong Regiment No. 1 – Regiment marching in full uniform
- Hong Kong Regiment No. 2 – Regiment infantry drill with rifles and bayonets
- Government House at Hong Kong
