= Second inauguration of Grover Cleveland =

27th United States presidential inauguration

Second presidential inauguration of Grover Cleveland
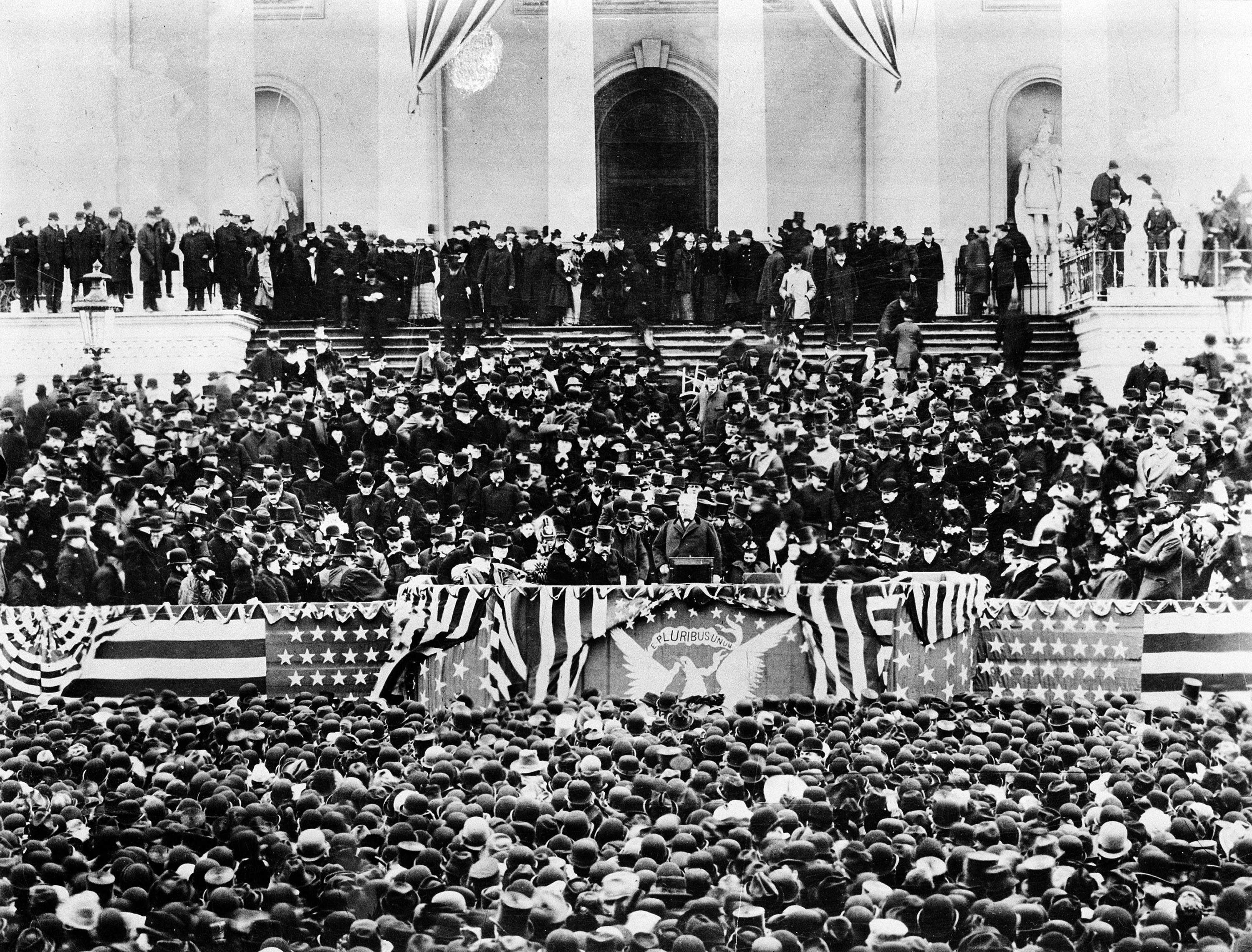
- Cleveland delivering his second inaugural address
- Date: March 4, 1893; 133 years ago
- Location: United States Capitol, Washington, D.C.
- Participants: Grover Cleveland; 24th president of the United States — Assuming office Melville Fuller; Chief Justice of the United States — Administering oath Adlai Stevenson I 23rd vice president of the United States — Assuming office Levi P. Morton; 22nd vice president of the United States — Administering oath

The inauguration of Grover Cleveland as the 24th president of the United States took place on Saturday, March 4, 1893, at the East Portico of the United States Capitol in Washington, D.C. This was the 27th inauguration and marked the commencement of the second and final four-year term of Cleveland as president and the only term of Adlai Stevenson I as vice president. Cleveland had been inaugurated as the 22nd president exactly eight years earlier, making him the first former U.S. president to be re-inaugurated. Chief Justice Melville Fuller administered the presidential oath of office. It snowed during the inauguration.

An inaugural ball occurred afterwards at the old Pension Building, it was reported to be the first such inaugural ball featuring illumination by electric light.

== Gallery ==
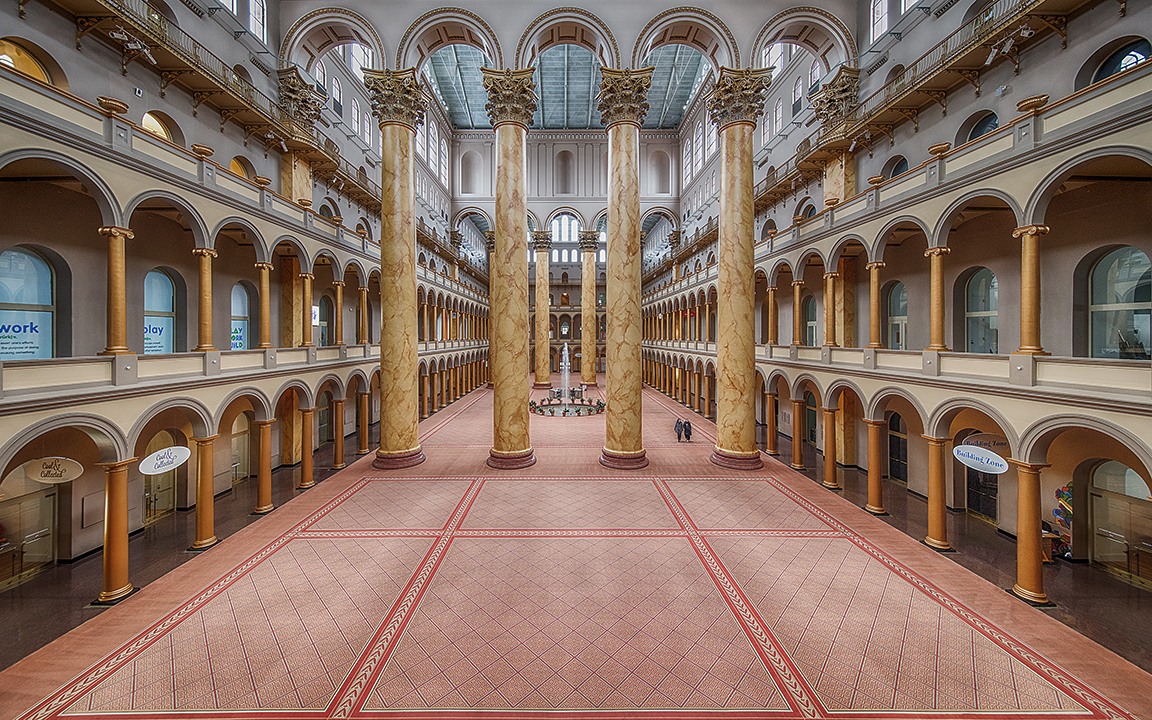
The vast main floor of the Pension Building (National Building Museum) was inspired by the Greek Parthenon, it was the site for Cleveland's inaugural ball

== See also ==
- Second presidency of Grover Cleveland
- First inauguration of Grover Cleveland
- 1892 United States presidential election
