= Texas Seed Bill =

1887 United States federal law

The Texas Seed Bill was a 1887 United States federal law to deliver $10,000 of aid to purchase seed grain for farmers after a major drought in Texas. The law was vetoed by President Grover Cleveland. In his veto message, Cleveland argued:

I can find no warrant for such an appropriation in the Constitution, and I do not believe that the power and duty of the general government ought to be extended to the relief of individual suffering which is in no manner properly related to the public service or benefit. A prevalent tendency to disregard the limited mission of this power and duty should, I think, be steadfastly resisted, to the end that the lesson should be constantly enforced that, though the people support the government, the government should not support the people.
