= First inauguration of Grover Cleveland =

25th United States presidential inauguration

First presidential inauguration of Grover Cleveland
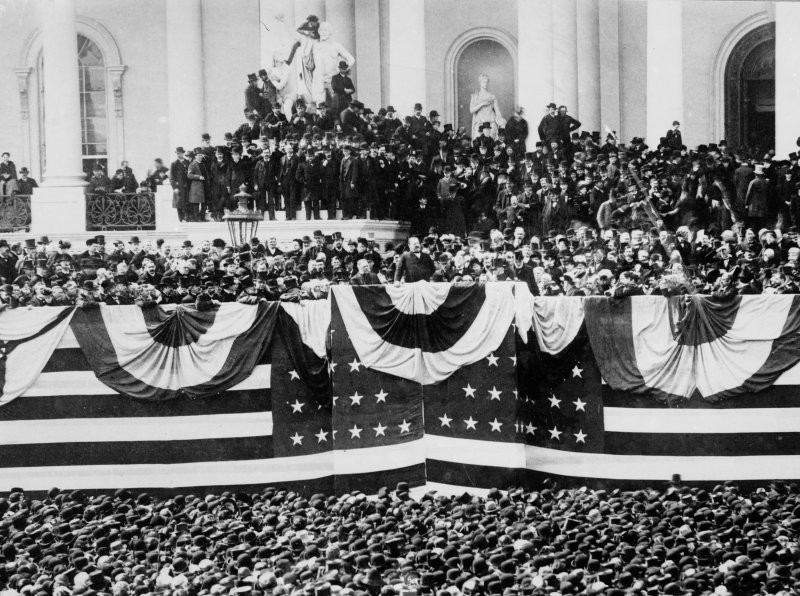
- Cleveland delivering his first inaugural address
- Date: March 4, 1885; 141 years ago
- Location: United States Capitol, Washington, D.C.
- Participants: Grover Cleveland; 22nd president of the United States — Assuming office Morrison Waite; Chief Justice of the United States — Administering oath Thomas A. Hendricks; 21st vice president of the United States — Assuming office George F. Edmunds; President pro tempore of the United States Senate — Administering oath

The inauguration of Grover Cleveland as the 22nd president of the United States took place on Wednesday, March 4, 1885, at the East Portico of the United States Capitol in Washington, D.C. This was the 25th inauguration and marked the commencement of the first four-year term of Grover Cleveland as president and the only term of Thomas A. Hendricks as vice president. Hendricks died 266 days into this term, and the office remained vacant since there was no constitutional provision which allow an intra-term vice-presidential office filling; it would be regulated by the Twenty-fifth Amendment in 1967.

Chief Justice Morrison Waite administered the presidential oath of office, and Cleveland held a Bible given to him at age 15 by his mother as he recited it. After leaving office in 1889, Cleveland won a nonconsecutive second term in 1892. His second inauguration took place exactly eight years after his first, on March 4, 1893.

In the presidential election of 1884, Cleveland won New York by only 1,500 votes out of over a million cast (Statistics taken from Miller Center). He was the first Democrat to win the presidency since the Civil War. In his first speech as president, he emphasized the importance of healing partisan divisions and encouraged citizens to scrutinize the government. At the time, there was a lot of political fighting between different parties, which Cleveland wanted to change. Additionally, he urged the American people to uphold the Declaration of Independence and not be afraid to overthrow a tyrannical government, should the need arise.

It was the inauguration that started the tradition of holding an inaugural ball. The ball was held in the Pension Building, even though some construction was incomplete at the time. Subsequent balls were held at the same location through the Theodore Roosevelt years.

== Gallery ==
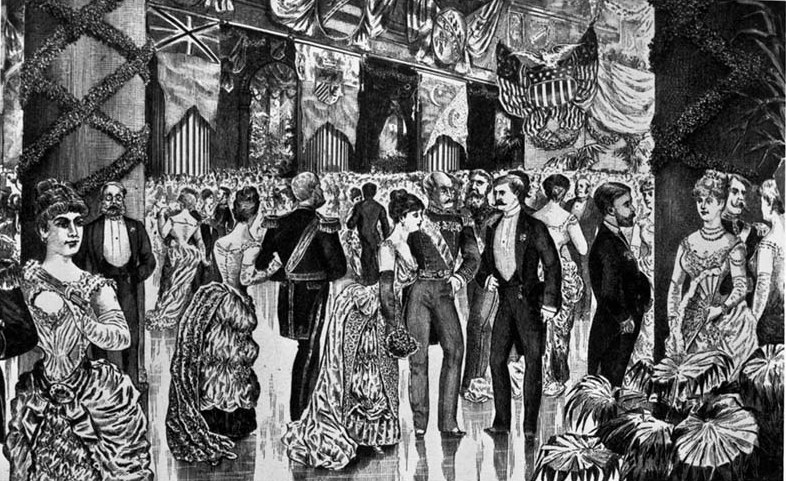
The inaugural ball for president Grover Cleveland held at the Pension Building in Washington DC, 1885

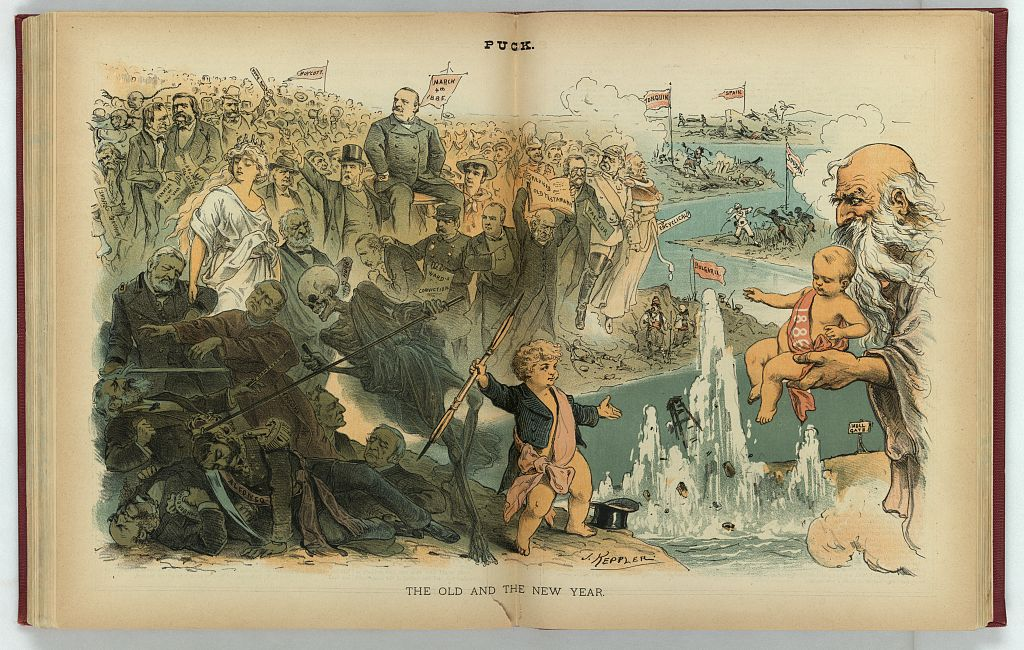
Illustration shows Father Time presenting the new year labeled "1886" to Puck standing in the foreground, holding his lithographic pencil; behind him are scenes of events from 1885, such as President Cleveland's inauguration on March 4th

== See also ==
- First presidency of Grover Cleveland
- Second inauguration of Grover Cleveland
- 1884 United States presidential election
