= Thomas F. Bayard =

American lawyer, politician and diplomat (1828–1898)

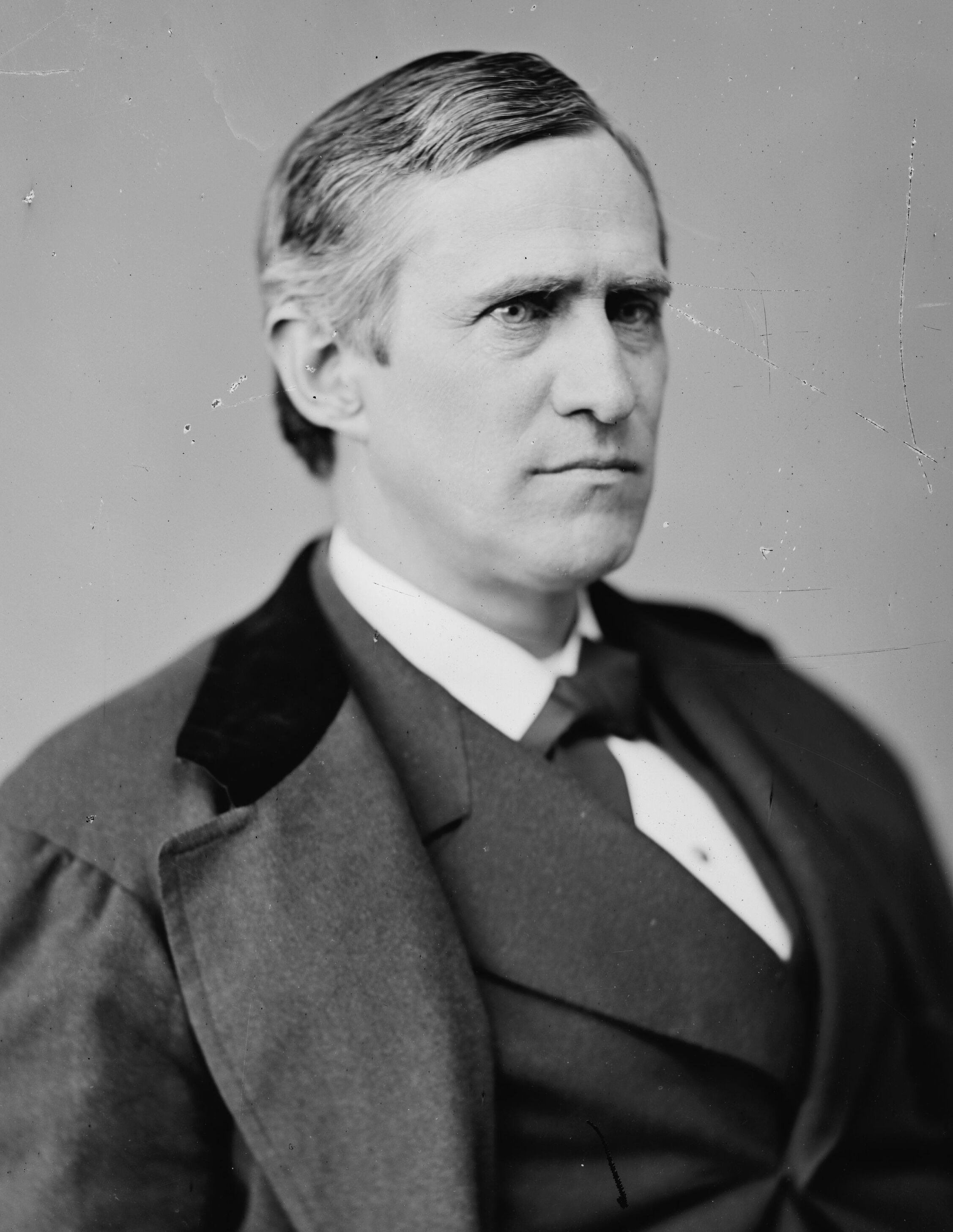
- Official portrait, c. 1870–1880

United States Ambassador to the United Kingdom
- In office June 22, 1893 – March 17, 1897
- President: Grover Cleveland; William McKinley
- Preceded by: Robert Todd Lincoln (Note: As Minister)
- Succeeded by: John Hay

30th United States Secretary of State
- In office March 7, 1885 – March 6, 1889
- President: Grover Cleveland; Benjamin Harrison
- Preceded by: Frederick T. Frelinghuysen
- Succeeded by: James G. Blaine

President pro tempore of the United States Senate
- In office October 10, 1881 – October 13, 1881
- Preceded by: Allen G. Thurman
- Succeeded by: David Davis

United States Senator from Delaware
- In office March 4, 1869 – March 6, 1885
- Preceded by: James A. Bayard Jr.
- Succeeded by: George Gray

Personal details
- Born: Thomas Francis Bayard; October 29, 1828 Wilmington, Delaware, U.S.
- Died: September 28, 1898 (aged 69) Dedham, Massachusetts, U.S.
- Party: Democratic
- Spouses: Louise Lee (m. 1856; died 1886) Mary Clymer (m. 1889)
- Children: 12, including Thomas and Florence
- Parent: James A. Bayard Jr. (father)
- Relatives: Nicholas Bayard (great-great-granduncle)

Thomas Francis Bayard Sr. (October 29, 1828 – September 28, 1898) was an American lawyer, politician and diplomat from Wilmington, Delaware. A Democrat, he served three terms as the United States senator from Delaware and made three unsuccessful bids for the Democratic nomination for President of the United States. In 1885, President Grover Cleveland appointed him Secretary of State. After four years in private life, he returned to the diplomatic arena as Ambassador to Great Britain.

Born in Delaware to a prominent family, Bayard learned politics from his father James A. Bayard Jr., who also served in the Senate. In 1869, the Delaware legislature elected Bayard to the Senate upon his father's retirement. A Peace Democrat during the Civil War, Bayard spent his early years in the Senate in opposition to Republican policies, especially the Reconstruction of the defeated Confederate states. His conservatism extended to financial matters as he became known as a staunch supporter of the gold standard and an opponent of greenbacks and silver coinage which he believed would cause inflation. Bayard's conservative politics made him popular in the Southern United States and with financial interests in the Eastern United States, but never popular enough to obtain the Democratic nomination for president which he attempted to win in 1876, 1880 and 1884.

In 1885, President Cleveland appointed Bayard Secretary of State. Bayard worked with Cleveland to promote American trade in the Pacific while avoiding the acquisition of colonies at a time when many Americans clamored for them. He sought increased cooperation with the United Kingdom of Great Britain and Ireland, working to resolve disputes over fishing and seal-hunting rights in the waters around the Canada–United States border. As ambassador, Bayard continued to strive for Anglo-American friendship. This brought him into conflict with his successor at the State Department Richard Olney, when Olney and Cleveland demanded more aggressive diplomatic overtures than Bayard wished in the Venezuelan crisis of 1895. His term at the American embassy ended in 1897 and he died the following year.

== Early life and family ==
Coat of arms of Thomas F. Bayard

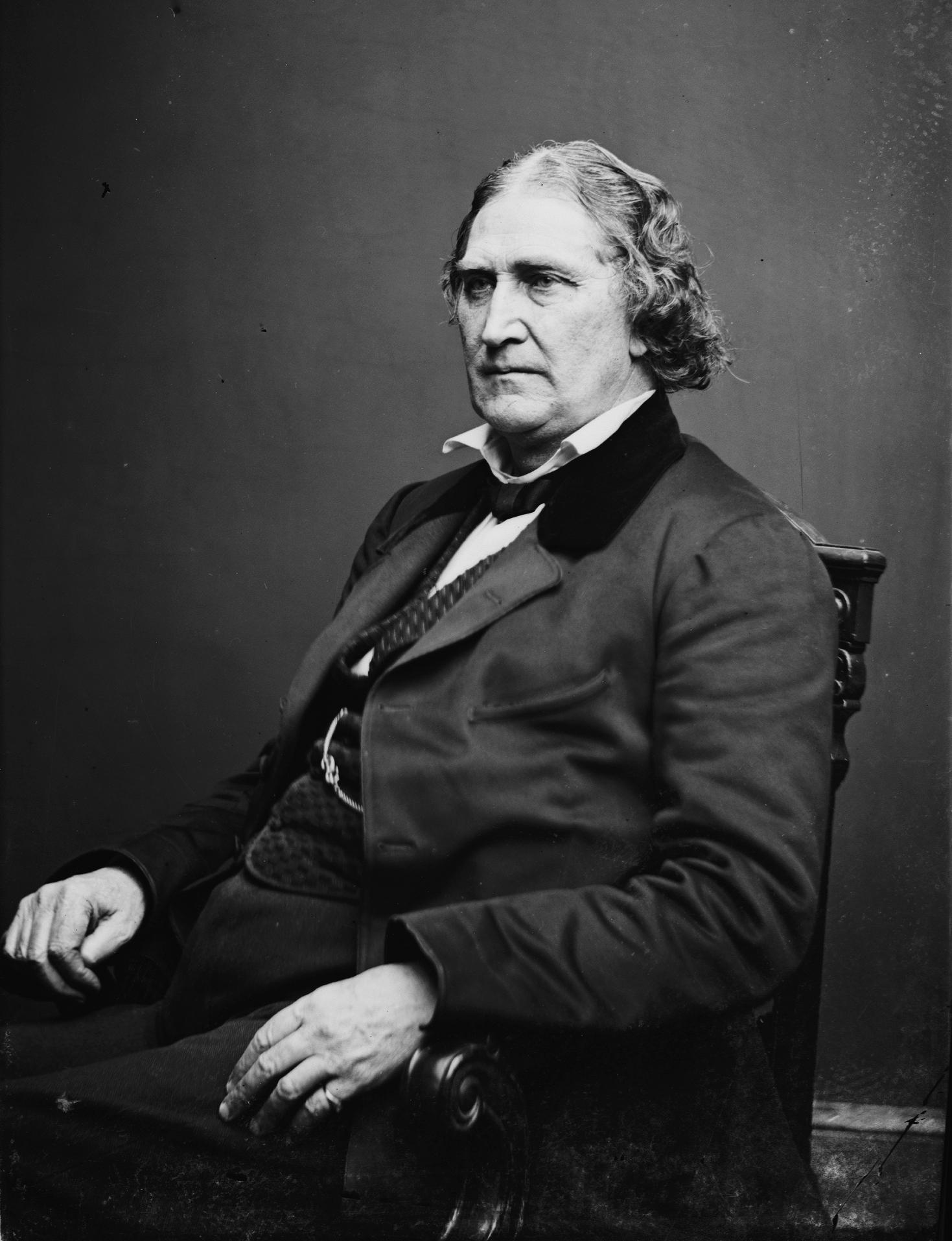
Bayard's father, James A. Bayard Jr., served as a United States Senator from Delaware in the 1850s and 1860s.

Bayard was born in Wilmington, Delaware, in 1828, the second son of James A. Bayard Jr. and Anne née Francis. The Bayard family was prominent in Delaware, as Bayard's father would be elected to the United States Senate in 1851. Among Bayard's ancestors were his grandfather James A. Bayard, also a U.S. senator; and great-grandfather Richard Bassett, who served as U.S senator from and governor of Delaware. Several other relatives served in high office, including Bayard's uncle Richard H. Bayard, another Delaware senator; and his great-great-granduncle Nicholas Bayard, who was mayor of New York City. On his mother's side, Bayard descended from Philadelphia lawyer and financier Tench Francis Jr. Bayard was educated in private academies in Wilmington and then in Flushing, New York, when his father moved to New York City for business reasons. Bayard remained in New York when his father returned to Delaware in 1843, and he worked as a clerk in the mercantile firm of his brother-in-law August Schermerhorn.

In 1846, his father secured him a job in a banking firm in Philadelphia, and he worked there for the next two years. Bayard was unsatisfied with his progress at the firm and returned to Wilmington to read law at his father's office. Bayard was admitted to the bar in 1851, the year that his father was elected to the U.S. Senate. (Note: Before the passage of the Seventeenth Amendment to the United States Constitution in 1913, U.S. senators were chosen by their states' legislatures.) Thomas took on greater responsibilities in the family law office and rose quickly in the legal profession. In 1853, after the election of Democratic President Franklin Pierce, Bayard was appointed United States Attorney for Delaware. He spent only a year in the position before moving to Philadelphia to open a law practice with his friend William Shippen, a partnership that lasted until Shippen's death in 1858. While in Philadelphia, Bayard met Louise Lee, whom he married in October 1856. The marriage produced twelve children.

== Civil War and Reconstruction ==
Bayard's return to Wilmington in 1858 brought greater involvement in the political scene. James Bayard was a delegate to the 1860 Democratic National Convention, and Thomas attended with him. The elder Bayard supported Robert M. T. Hunter of Virginia for the nomination. When the convention deadlocked and the Southern Democrats split from the main party, James Bayard adhered to the regular Democrats, but told Thomas that he thought the nominee, Stephen A. Douglas of Illinois, was untrustworthy. The subsequent election of Republican Abraham Lincoln and secession of the seven states of the Deep South led both Bayards to fear for the future of the Union, and the elder Bayard to propose a convention of all the states to resolve their differences. In the meantime, as four more Southern states seceded, James Bayard encouraged his son to help organize an independent militia unit, the Delaware Guard; Thomas Bayard was commissioned as its First Lieutenant.

In 1860, Delaware occupied an unusual position in the free state-slave state divide; nominally a slave state, Delaware's slave population had been in steep decline for decades and represented just 1.6% of the state's people. Opinion on secession was mixed in Delaware, but the Bayards were Peace Democrats and leaned to the Southern perspective. They blamed the war on abolitionist Republicans and believed that secession, while unwise, should not be suppressed with military force. Thomas Bayard spoke at a public meeting in Dover in June 1861, saying that "with this secession, or revolution, or rebellion, or by whatever name it may be called, the State of Delaware has naught to do." Even after the Civil War's first battles erupted in Virginia, Bayard continued to hope for peace. By early 1862, the Delaware Guard came under suspicion of Southern sympathies, and Major General Henry du Pont, commander of the state militia, ordered it disarmed. When Bayard refused to comply, he was briefly arrested before being released on parole. Bayard's father was reelected to the Senate in 1862, but resigned shortly thereafter in protest of the new oath of office, which demanded that Senators swear they had never borne arms against the United States nor given aid and encouragement to its enemies.

Bayard and his father continued in private law practice through the war. Both were pleased with the Democrats' peace platform in 1864, but disappointed in the choice of nominee, Major General George B. McClellan, a War Democrat. In 1866, Thomas Bayard successfully represented four South Carolinians in habeas corpus cases against the military. The following year, Senator George R. Riddle died and the legislature elected James Bayard to fill the remainder of the term, which ended in 1869. (Note: The oath to which James Bayard had objected in 1862 had been held unconstitutional by the Supreme Court in Ex parte Garland, 71 U.S. 333 (1866).) Bayard became more politically active, speaking at a public meeting in September 1867 against constitutional proposals for ending racial discrimination in voting rights. The following year, he condemned the impeachment proceedings against President Andrew Johnson, who had succeeded to the presidency in 1865 after Lincoln's assassination and had threatened the Republican Congress's plans for Reconstruction of the Southern states. Both Bayards attended the 1868 Democratic National Convention and, although they were unenthusiastic about the nominee, Horatio Seymour, supported the unsuccessful ticket that year.

== United States Senator ==
=== Reaction to Reconstruction ===
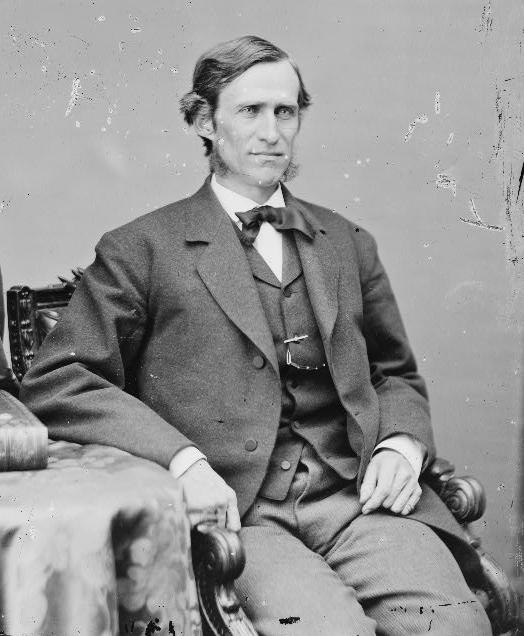
Photograph of Thomas F. Bayard, c. 1870

Bayard's father retired from the Senate when his term ended in 1869, and the legislature elected his son to the seat with little opposition. Bayard entered a Senate in which his fellow Democrats were greatly outnumbered by Republicans; the new president, Ulysses S. Grant, was also a Republican. In the Reconstruction Era, Bayard took up the cause of the defeated South, speaking against the continued military rule of the conquered states and advocating a return to civilian (and conservative) government. He protested the requirement that readmitted Southern states ratify the Fourteenth Amendment, which guaranteed equal protection of the laws to all Americans. Bayard also inveighed against the continued presence of federal troops in the South. He spoke against each of the three Enforcement Acts, which increased the federal government's power to protect black Southerners' civil and political rights in the face of rising violence by the Ku Klux Klan and other groups.

Although his protests were to little effect, Bayard continued to voice opposition to the majority party's plans for reconstructing the South. In 1871, he was named to a joint committee sent by Congress to investigate conditions in the South. The committee, like the Congress, had a Republican majority, and their report detailed many of the Klan's outrages against the newly freed slaves. Bayard dissented, questioning the veracity of the witnesses' testimony and stating that there were few incidents of lawlessness and that the South was generally at peace. The majority disagreed, and their findings were the basis for the Third Enforcement Act later that year.

As more Democrats returned to the Senate, and as Republican goals shifted elsewhere, Bayard's ideas gained some traction, but were still largely in vain. In 1873, the Senate passed a resolution he introduced that demanded that Grant disclose how much government money was being expended in enforcing Reconstruction laws in the South, and to whom it was paid; the President ignored the resolution. The next year, Bayard opposed a Republican bill authorizing federal supervision of the upcoming election in Louisiana, attacking the Republican administration there as corrupt; he was unsuccessful, and the election was supervised by federal troops. He spoke forcefully against the proposed Civil Rights Act of 1875, which was to be the last such act for nearly a century. Again, he was unsuccessful and the bill, which guaranteed equal treatment in public accommodations regardless of race, passed Congress and became law. (Note: The Supreme Court struck down the Civil Rights Act of 1875 in the Civil Rights Cases of 1883.) Although ultimately unsuccessful, Bayard's actions endeared him to his conservative constituents, and he was elected to another six-year term in 1874.

=== Specie resumption ===
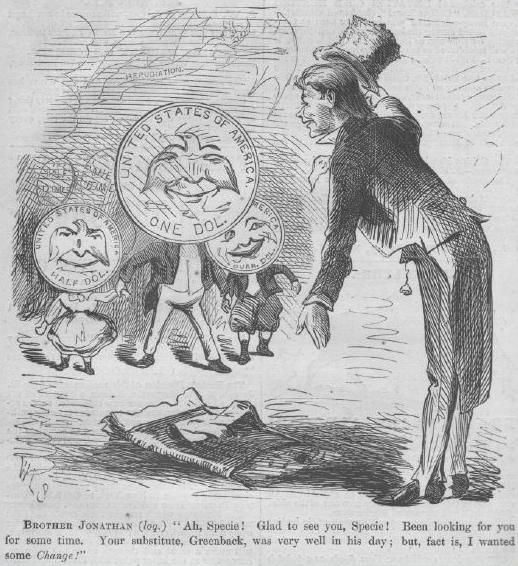
A cartoon from the April 9, 1870, issue of Harper's Weekly anticipates the resumption of government payments in precious-metal coins. "Brother Jonathan" was a personification of the United States before "Uncle Sam".

From the start of his congressional career, Bayard was an advocate of hard money, i.e., a dollar backed by gold. During the Civil War, Congress had authorized a new form of currency, redeemable not in specie (gold or silver coin) but in 6% government bonds. These United States Notes, popularly known as "greenbacks," had helped to finance the war when the government's gold supply did not keep pace with the expanding costs of maintaining the armies. When the crisis had passed, many in Congress (including Bayard) wanted to return the nation's currency to a gold standard as soon as possible. The process of retiring the greenbacks had already begun when Bayard was elected, but stopped when many Senators and Representatives thought the fiscal contraction too severe, and likely to be harmful to the economy. In 1869, Congress passed the Public Credit Act of 1869, which required that the government pay its bond holders in gold, not greenbacks. Bayard thought the bill not strong enough, since it did not require removing greenbacks from circulation, and he voted against it.

In 1873, a business depression (known as the Panic of 1873), increased the pressure for retaining greenbacks, as some in Congress believed that inflating the currency would ease the economic problems. Grant's Treasury Secretary, William Adams Richardson, reissued $26 million of the redeemed greenbacks, reversing the administration's previous policy of removing them from circulation. This ignited a four-month debate in the Senate over whether and when the government should return to backing all of its currency with gold—including the remaining greenbacks. The majority, including Bayard, favored resumption, but in wording the resolution that passed the Senate, Republican John Sherman of Ohio left vague the exact timing; Bayard feared it would be put off indefinitely. The Sherman bill also proposed to remove greenbacks from circulation by exchanging them for bonds payable in gold; in response, Bayard proposed an amendment limiting the amount of debt the government could incur. When the amendment was rejected, Bayard voted against the bill (known as the Specie Payment Resumption Act), believing that it was likely to cause inflation.

=== Election of 1876 ===
Bayard served on the Electoral Commission (pictured) that decided the disputed 1876 presidential election

Bayard's popularity with his party had grown during his time in the Senate, and by 1875 he was seen as a contender for the presidency. His advocacy of hard money had won him friends in some of the Northern cities, and his stance against Reconstruction made him popular throughout the South. Competing for those same factions of the Democratic party was New York governor Samuel J. Tilden, who had gained national fame for fighting the political corruption of William M. Tweed's Tammany Hall machine in New York City. Other contenders included Governor Thomas A. Hendricks of Indiana and Major General Winfield Scott Hancock. Tilden's wealth and national renown helped gather delegates to his cause, and in June 1876, he entered the convention with 404½ votes; Bayard placed fifth with 33. Tilden was nominated on the second ballot. Displeased with the result, Bayard nonetheless supported the Democratic nominee against Governor Rutherford B. Hayes of Ohio, the Republican candidate, speaking to large crowds in cities across the North and Midwest.

On election day, the vote was close, but appeared to favor a Tilden victory. Three days later, Tilden looked to have won 184 electoral votes, one short of a majority, while Hayes appeared to have 166 votes, with the votes of Florida, Louisiana, and South Carolina still in doubt. (Note: One of the three electors from Oregon (a state Hayes had won) was also disqualified, reducing Hayes's total to 165, and raising the disputed votes to 20.) Each party sent their people to observe the vote in the disputed states. Abram Hewitt, chairman of the Democratic National Committee, asked Bayard to travel to Louisiana along with several others, but Bayard refused to go. The counts of the disputed ballots were inconclusive, with each state producing two sets of returns, one signed by Democratic officials, the other by Republicans, each claiming victory for their man. There was debate about which person or house of Congress was authorized to decide between the competing slates of electors, with the Republican Senate and the Democratic House each claiming priority. By January 1877, with the question still unresolved, Congress and President Grant agreed to submit the matter to a bipartisan Electoral Commission, which would be authorized to determine the fate of the disputed electoral votes. Bayard supported the idea, and visited Tilden in New York to convince him that it was the only alternative to stalemate and possible renewed civil war. The bill passed, with Bayard's vote, and provided for a commission of five representatives, five senators, and five Supreme Court justices.

To ensure partisan balance, there would be seven Democrats and seven Republicans; the fifteenth member was to be a Supreme Court justice chosen by the other four on the commission (themselves two Republicans and two Democrats). Justice David Davis, an independent respected by both parties, was expected to be their choice. Bayard was among the seven Democrats chosen. Davis upset the careful planning by accepting election to the Senate by the state of Illinois and refusing to serve on the commission. The remaining Supreme Court justices were all Republicans and, with the addition of Justice Joseph P. Bradley to the place intended for Davis, the commission had an 8–7 Republican majority. The commission met and considered all of the disputed ballots, awarding each to Hayes by an 8–7 party-line vote. Bayard and his fellow Democrats were outraged, and the Democratic majority in the House threatened to filibuster to prevent the results from being accepted. As the March 4 inauguration day approached, leaders of both parties met at Wormley's Hotel in Washington to negotiate a compromise. Republicans promised that, in exchange for Democratic acquiescence in the committee's decision, Hayes would order federal troops to withdraw from the South and accept the election of Democratic governments in the remaining "unredeemed" states there. The Democrats agreed and the filibuster ended. Tilden later blamed Bayard, among others, for his role in creating the Electoral Commission, but Bayard defended his position, believing that the only alternative to the result was civil war.

=== Gold standard ===
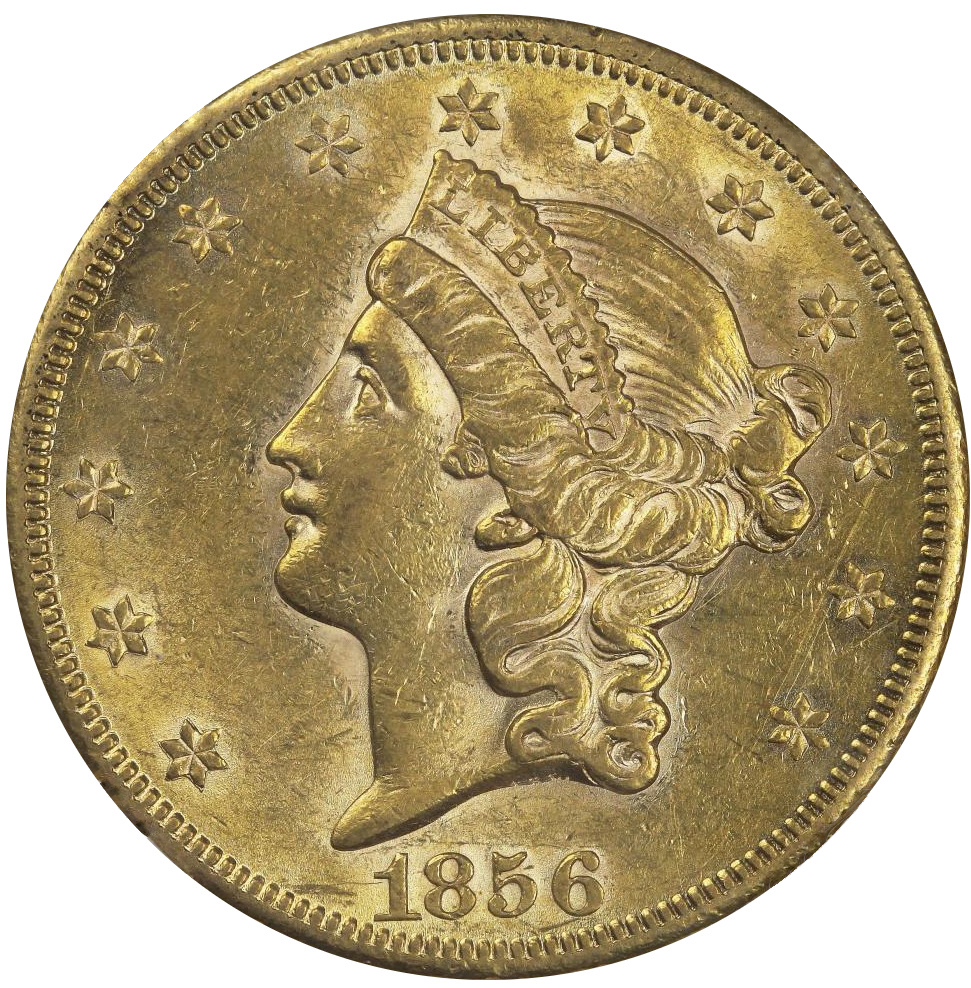
Bayard was a strong supporter of gold-backed currency

In 1873, Congress had passed a Coinage Act that regulated which coins were legal tender. The list of legal coins duplicated that of the previous coinage act, leaving off only the silver dollar and three smaller coins. The rationale in the Treasury report accompanying the draft bill was that to mint a gold dollar and a silver dollar with different intrinsic values was problematic; as the silver dollar did not circulate and the gold did, it made sense to drop the unused coin. The bill passed easily, with Bayard's support, but quickly thereafter became unpopular. Opponents of the bill would later call this omission the "Crime of '73," and would mean it literally, circulating tales of bribery of Congressmen by foreign agents.

Over the next few years, pressure to reintroduce silver coinage grew, and cut across party lines. In 1877, Republican Senator Stanley Matthews of Ohio introduced a resolution to pay the national debt in silver instead of gold. Bayard joined several Republicans in speaking and voting against the measure, calling it "folly," but it passed the Senate 42 to 20. Meanwhile, Democrat Richard P. Bland of Missouri furthered the silver cause from the House, proposing a free silver bill that would require the United States to buy as much silver as miners could sell the government and strike it into coins, a system that would increase the money supply and aid debtors.

In short, silver miners would sell the government metal worth fifty to seventy cents, and receive back a silver dollar. William B. Allison, a pro-silver Republican from Iowa, offered an amendment in the Senate requiring the purchase of two to four million dollars per month of silver, but not allowing private deposit of silver at the mints. Thus, the seignorage, or difference between the face value of the coin and the worth of the metal contained within it accrued to the government's credit, not private citizens. Bayard saw the whole effort as the path to inflation and economic ruin. Again, he spoke against the bill, but like the Matthews resolution, the Bland–Allison Act passed both houses of Congress in 1878. President Hayes shared Bayard's fear of inflation, and vetoed the bill, but Congress mustered the two-thirds vote necessary to overturn the veto, and it became law.

=== Clashes with Hayes ===
The elections of 1878 returned control of both houses of Congress to the Democrats for the first time since before the Civil War. The new Democratic majority passed an army appropriation bill in 1879 with a rider that repealed the Enforcement Acts. Those Acts, passed during Reconstruction, made it a crime to prevent someone from voting because of his race and allowed the use of federal troops to supervise elections. Bayard supported the effort, which passed both houses and sent to the President. Hayes was determined to preserve the law to protect black voters, and he vetoed the appropriation. Bayard spoke in favor of the bill, believing the time had come to end the military's involvement in Southern politics. The Democrats did not have enough votes to override the veto, but they passed a new bill with the same rider. Hayes vetoed this as well, and the process was repeated three times more. Finally, Hayes signed an appropriation without the rider, but Congress refused to pass another bill to fund federal marshals, who were vital to the enforcement of the Force Acts. The election laws remained in effect, but the funds to enforce them were cut off.

Bayard also clashed with Hayes on the issue of Chinese immigration. In 1868, the Senate had ratified the Burlingame Treaty with China, allowing an unrestricted flow of Chinese immigrants into the country. Bayard criticized the treaty because it treated Americans and the Chinese as equal races, when he believed the latter was inferior. As the economy soured after the Panic of 1873, Chinese immigrants were blamed for depressing workmen's wages. During the Great Railroad Strike of 1877, anti-Chinese riots broke out in San Francisco, and a third party, the Workingman's Party, was formed with an emphasis on stopping Chinese immigration. Bayard favored some restriction on Chinese immigration and voted in favor of a Chinese Exclusion Act in 1879, which passed both houses that year. Hayes vetoed the bill, believing that the United States should not abrogate treaties without negotiation. The veto drew praise among some New England Republicans, but was bitterly denounced in the West. After the veto, Assistant Secretary of State Frederick W. Seward suggested that both countries work together to reduce immigration. Congress passed a new law to that effect, the Chinese Exclusion Act, in 1882. Bayard supported this new act, which became law with President Chester A. Arthur's signature that year.

=== Election of 1880 ===
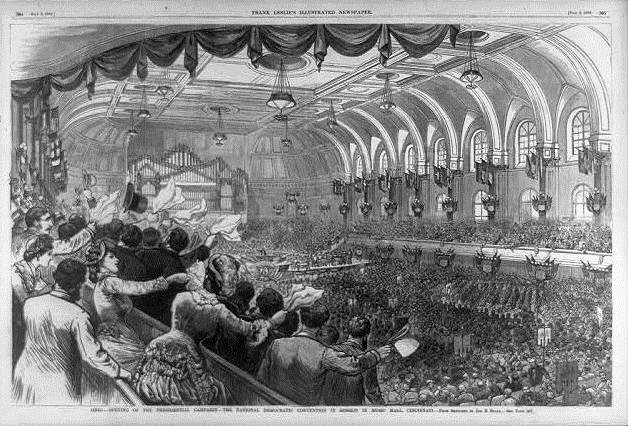
The 1880 Democratic National Convention in Cincinnati's Music Hall

As the election of 1880 drew near, Bayard was again regarded as a likely candidate. Hayes had pledged himself to a one-term presidency, which meant the Republicans would not have the advantage of incumbency. On the Democratic side, Tilden was regarded as the natural choice, as many Democrats were still convinced he had been robbed of the office in 1876. Tilden's supporters saw Bayard as a rival, and sought to smear him by suggesting he had colluded with Republicans to defeat Tilden in 1876. Meanwhile, in the House, Tilden supporter Clarkson Nott Potter of New York began an investigation into the 1876 election, hoping that evidence of Republican malfeasance would harm that party's candidate in 1880. In fact, the Potter committee's investigation had the opposite effect, uncovering telegrams from Tilden's nephew, William Tilden Pelton, that offered bribes to Southern Republicans in the disputed states to help Tilden claim their votes. (Note: The Pelton telegrams were in cipher, which the committee was able to decrypt. Republicans had also sent ciphered dispatches, but the committee was unable to decode them.) The telegrams doomed Tilden's hopes for the nomination, and boosted Bayard's chance among the erstwhile Tilden supporters.

As Tilden's star began to fade, many Democrats looked to Bayard. He remained popular in the Eastern cities for his conservatism and hard money beliefs, but many in the South, including Senator Augustus Hill Garland of Arkansas, advised Bayard to embrace silver to help halt the defections of Southern and Western Democrats to the new Greenback Party. Bayard declined to do so. He was also reluctant to strike a deal with John Kelly of New York, whose Tammany faction of the Democratic party was currently at odds with the Tilden machine there. After the party rift caused the defeat of the Democratic governor in New York's 1879 election, many Tilden adherents began to think their candidate could not win his home state, and drifted to Bayard, among others. Tilden's supporters attempted to weaken Bayard in February 1880 by publishing the speech he gave in Dover in 1861, in which he said that the United States should acquiesce in Southern secession. At the same time, Bayard's uncompromising stance on the money question pushed some Democrats to support Major General Winfield Scott Hancock, who had not been identified with either extreme in the gold-silver debate and had a military record that appealed to Northerners.

Leading up to the convention in Cincinnati, Tilden remained ambiguous about his intentions. George Gray, Delaware's attorney general, placed Bayard's name in nomination, calling the senator "a veteran, covered in scars of many a hard-fought battle, where the principles of constitutional liberty have been at stake ... Bayard is a statesman who will need no introduction to the American people." When the convention took its first ballot on June 23, Bayard placed second with 153½ votes, trailing only Hancock, who had 171. On the second ballot, the delegates broke for Hancock, and he was nominated. The Southern delegates, whom Bayard thought would be most loyal to him, were among the first to desert him. The convention nominated William Hayden English of Indiana, a Bayard supporter and hard-money man, for vice president, and then closed. Bayard's supporters were disappointed, but he supported the ticket as usual, in the interest of party unity. Hancock and English fought to a near-draw in the popular vote, but lost the electoral vote to James A. Garfield and Chester A. Arthur by 214 to 155.

=== Budget surplus and civil service reform ===
The Delaware legislature re-elected Bayard to the Senate for a third term in 1881 without serious opposition. The Senate in the 47th Congress was evenly divided between Republicans and Democrats, with the new vice president, Arthur, holding the tie-breaking vote. (Note: The Senate contained 37 Democrats, 37 Republicans, and two independents, one of which caucused with each major party.) After spending the special session of March 1881 in an intra-Republican Party fight over the confirmation of Garfield's cabinet nominees, the Senate went into recess until October. By that time, Garfield had been assassinated and Arthur was president. When the Senate reconvened, the Democrats held the majority briefly, and Bayard was elected president pro tempore on October 10; Republicans regained the majority three days later as Republican latecomers arrived and were sworn in, and David Davis took over the office.

Among the issues confronting the Senate was the surplus of government funds. With high revenue held over from wartime taxes, the federal government had collected more than it spent since 1866; by 1882 the surplus reached $145 million. Opinions varied on how to balance the budget; the Democrats wished to lower tariffs, in order to reduce revenues and the cost of imported goods, while Republicans believed that high tariffs ensured high wages in manufacturing and mining. They preferred the government spend more on internal improvements and pensions for Civil War soldiers while reducing excise taxes. Bayard did not oppose some veterans' pensions, but worried that pensions would require continued high tariffs, which he opposed. He supported the movement for a commission to examine the tariff and suggest improvements, but opposed the resulting Tariff of 1883, which reduced tariffs by an average of 1.47%. Congressional Republicans also sought to deplete the surplus through a Rivers and Harbors Act that increased spending on internal improvements; Bayard opposed the bill and was gratified when Arthur vetoed it against his own party's wishes.

Bayard and Arthur also agreed on the need for civil service reform. Garfield's assassination by a deranged office seeker amplified the public demand for civil service reform. Leaders of both parties, including Bayard, realized that they could attract the votes of reformers by turning against the spoils system and, by 1882, a bipartisan effort began in favor of reform. In 1880, Democratic Senator George H. Pendleton of Ohio introduced legislation that required selection of civil servants based on merit as determined by an examination, but the bill did not pass. After the 1882 congressional elections, in which Democrats campaigned successfully on the reform issue, the Pendleton bill was proposed again, and again Bayard supported it, saying that "the offices of this Government are created ... for the public service and not for the private use of incumbents." The Senate approved the bill 38–5 and the House soon concurred by a vote of 155–47. Arthur signed the Pendleton Civil Service Reform Act into law on January 16, 1883.

=== Election of 1884 ===
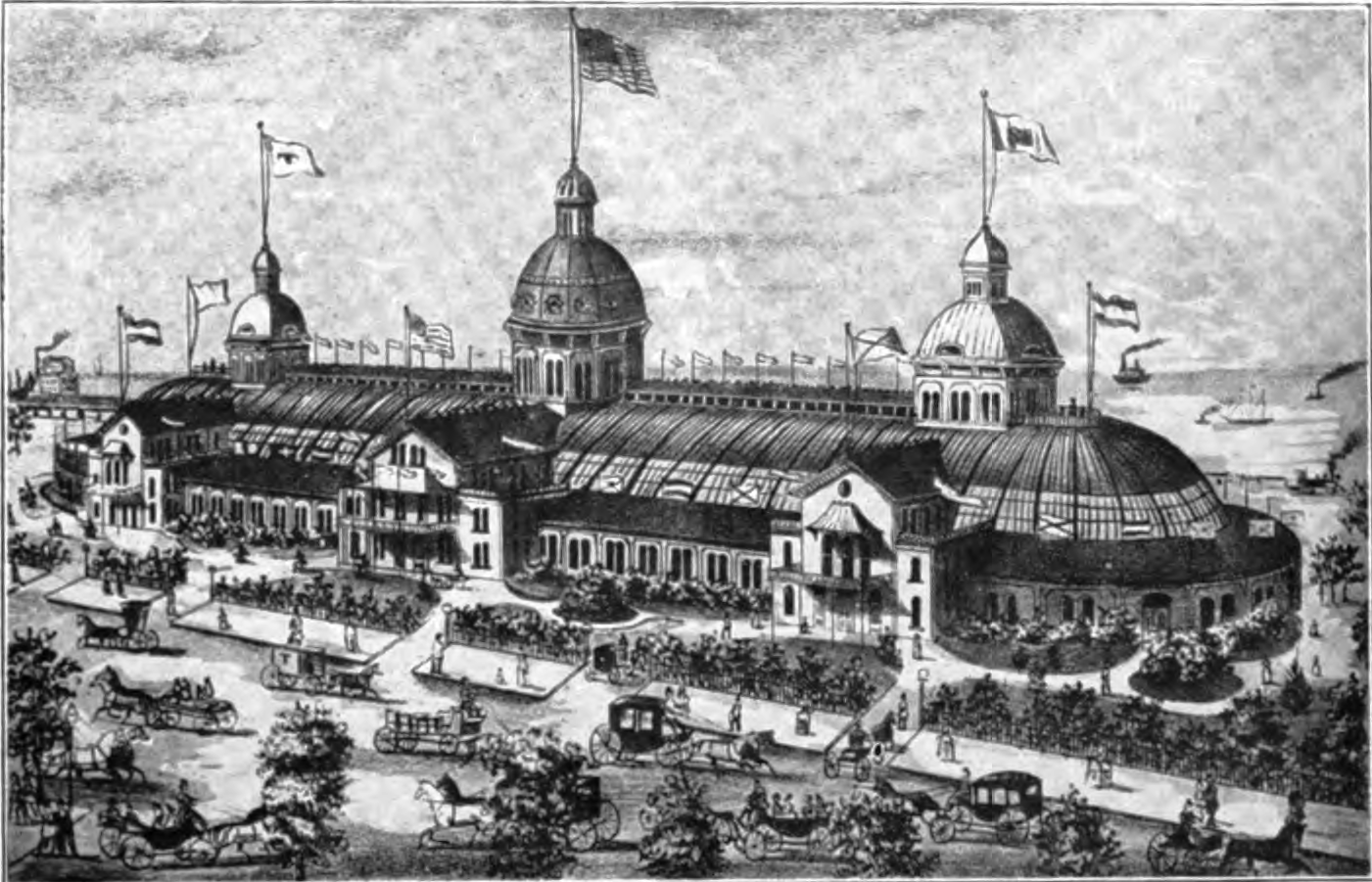
Both the Republicans and Democrats held their conventions at Chicago's Interstate Industrial Exposition Hall in 1884.

Despite his rebukes at the Democratic national conventions in 1876 and 1880, Bayard was again considered among the leading candidates for the nomination in 1884. Tilden again was ambiguous about his willingness to run, but by 1883 New York's new governor, Grover Cleveland, began to surpass Tilden as a likely candidate. After Tilden definitively bowed out in June 1884, many of his former supporters began to flock to Bayard. Many Democrats were concerned with Cleveland's ability to carry his home state after he, like Tilden before him, became embroiled in a feud with the Tammany Hall wing of the party. At the same time, the Tammany Democrats became more friendly to Bayard.

By the time the Democrats had assembled in Chicago on July 8, 1884, to begin their convention, the Republicans had already picked their nominee: James G. Blaine of Maine. Blaine's nomination turned many reform-minded Republicans (known as Mugwumps) away from their party. Bayard and Cleveland, seen as honest politicians, were the Democrats most favored by the renegade Republican faction. Bayard was optimistic at the start of the convention, but the results of the first ballot ran heavily against him: 170 votes to Cleveland's 392. The reason was the same as in 1880: as Representative Robert S. Stevens of New York said, "I believe if he were President his Administration would be one in which every American citizen would take pride. I believe he is a patriot, but it would be a suicidal attempt to nominate him. His [1861] Dover speech would be sent into every household in the North." The voting the next day demonstrated the point, as Cleveland was nominated on the second ballot.

The resulting campaign between Cleveland and Blaine focused more on scandal and mudslinging than the issues of the day. In the end, Cleveland eked out a narrow victory. Carrying New York was crucial for the Democrat; a shift of just 550 votes in that state would have given the election to Blaine. Instead, Cleveland carried his home state and a Democrat was elected president for the first time since 1856.

== Secretary of State ==
Cleveland recognized Bayard's status in the party hierarchy by offering him the top spot in his cabinet, Secretary of State. Bayard did not think himself an expert in foreign affairs and enjoyed the sixteen years he had spent in the Senate; even so, he accepted the post and joined the administration. Washington journalist Benjamin Perley Poore described Bayard's personality and habits at that time:

Mr. Bayard has no appreciation of humor or fondness for political intrigue, and department drudgery would be intolerable to him were it not for his passionate fondness for out-door exercise. A bold horseman, an untiring pedestrian, and enthusiastic angler, and a good swimmer, he preserves his health, and gives close attention to the affairs of his Department.

=== Samoa and Hawaii ===
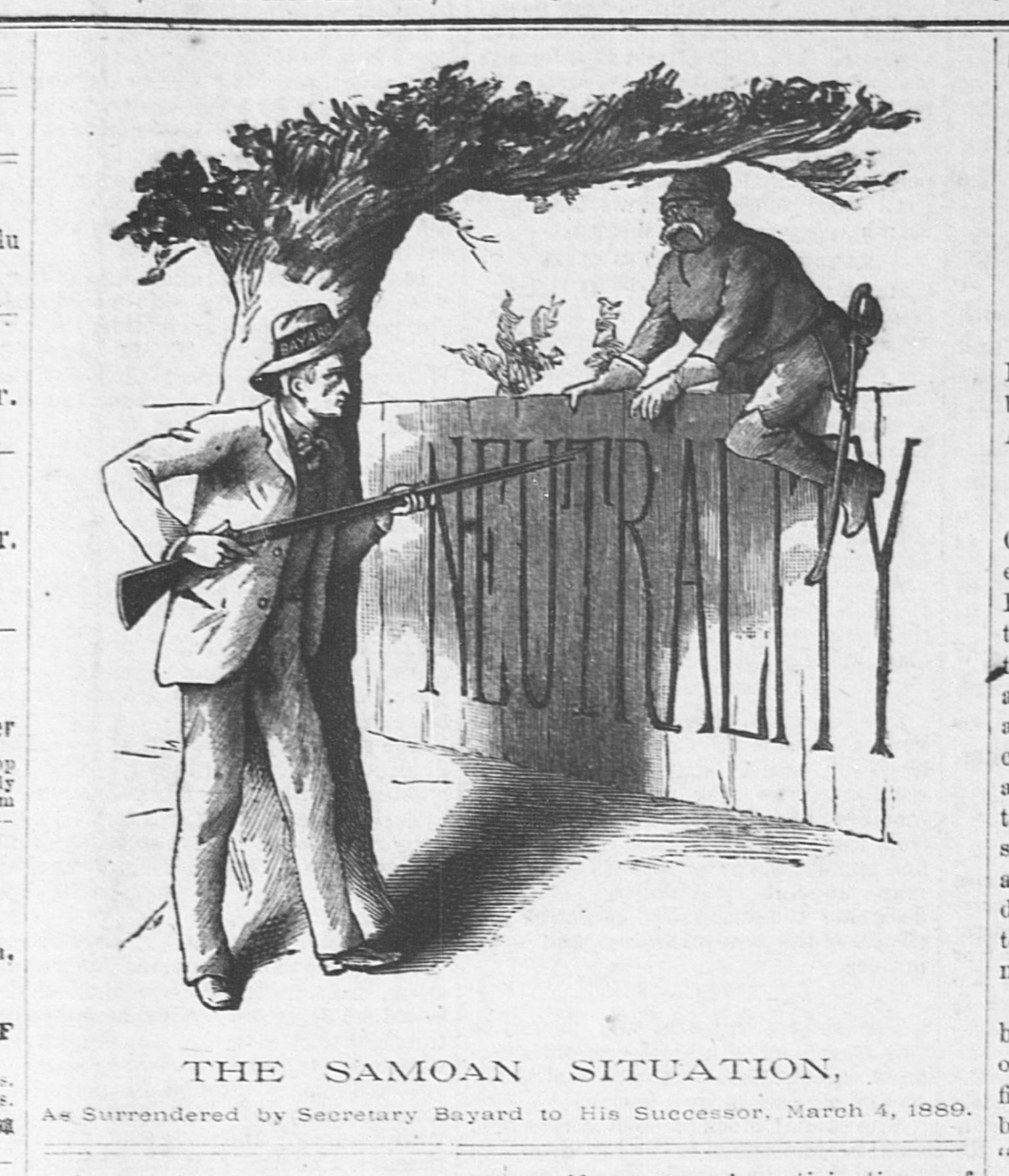
Bayard enforced neutrality in Samoa in the face of German encroachment.

Among the first foreign policy challenges Bayard and Cleveland faced was that concerning American influence in the Samoan Islands. The United States, Great Britain, and Germany all had treaties with the Samoan government that guaranteed their right to trade and establish naval bases there. In the 1880s, German chancellor Otto von Bismarck began to increase German influence in Samoa, and attempted to replace the Samoan king, Malietoa Laupepa, with Tamasese Titimaea, a claimant to the throne who favored German suzerainty. Bayard and Cleveland opposed any change that would undermine Samoan independence, as did the British government. Bayard filed a note of protest with the German government, and the three powers agreed to meet for a conference in Washington in June 1887, but they failed to achieve any agreement.

Shortly thereafter, Tamasese's unpopularity led another claimant, Mata'afa Iosefo, to start a rebellion that led to the Samoan Civil War. When Tamasese's German guards were killed, Bismarck considered it an attack on Germany, and sent warships to Samoa. Cleveland dispatched three American warships, Nipsic, Trenton, and Vandalia, in response, and a British warship joined them. As the threat of war grew, Bismarck backed down and agreed to another conference in 1889; two weeks later, a hurricane struck the harbor and all of the German and American warships were damaged or sunk. As tempers cooled, the parties met in conference in Berlin. By that time, Cleveland had been defeated for re-election and James G. Blaine took Bayard's place as Secretary of State. The three powers agreed to a tripartite protectorate of Samoa with Malietoa Laupepa restored as king; that situation prevailed until 1899, when renewed civil war led to a second convention partitioning the islands between Germany and the United States.

In the Kingdom of Hawaii, Bayard and Cleveland pursued a similar goal of maintaining the Hawaiian kingdom's independence while expanding access for American trade. As a Senator, Bayard had voted for free trade with Hawaii, but the treaty was allowed to lapse in 1884. As Secretary of State the following year, Bayard hoped to again have free trade with Hawaii, and also endorsed the idea of establishing an American naval base there, although he preferred Midway Atoll to the eventual location, Pearl Harbor. A treaty to that effect passed the Senate in 1887 by a 43–11 vote. As in Samoa, the administration sought to curb foreign influence, encouraging the Hawaiian government to reject a loan from Britain that would have required pledging future government revenues toward its repayment.

=== Relations with Britain ===
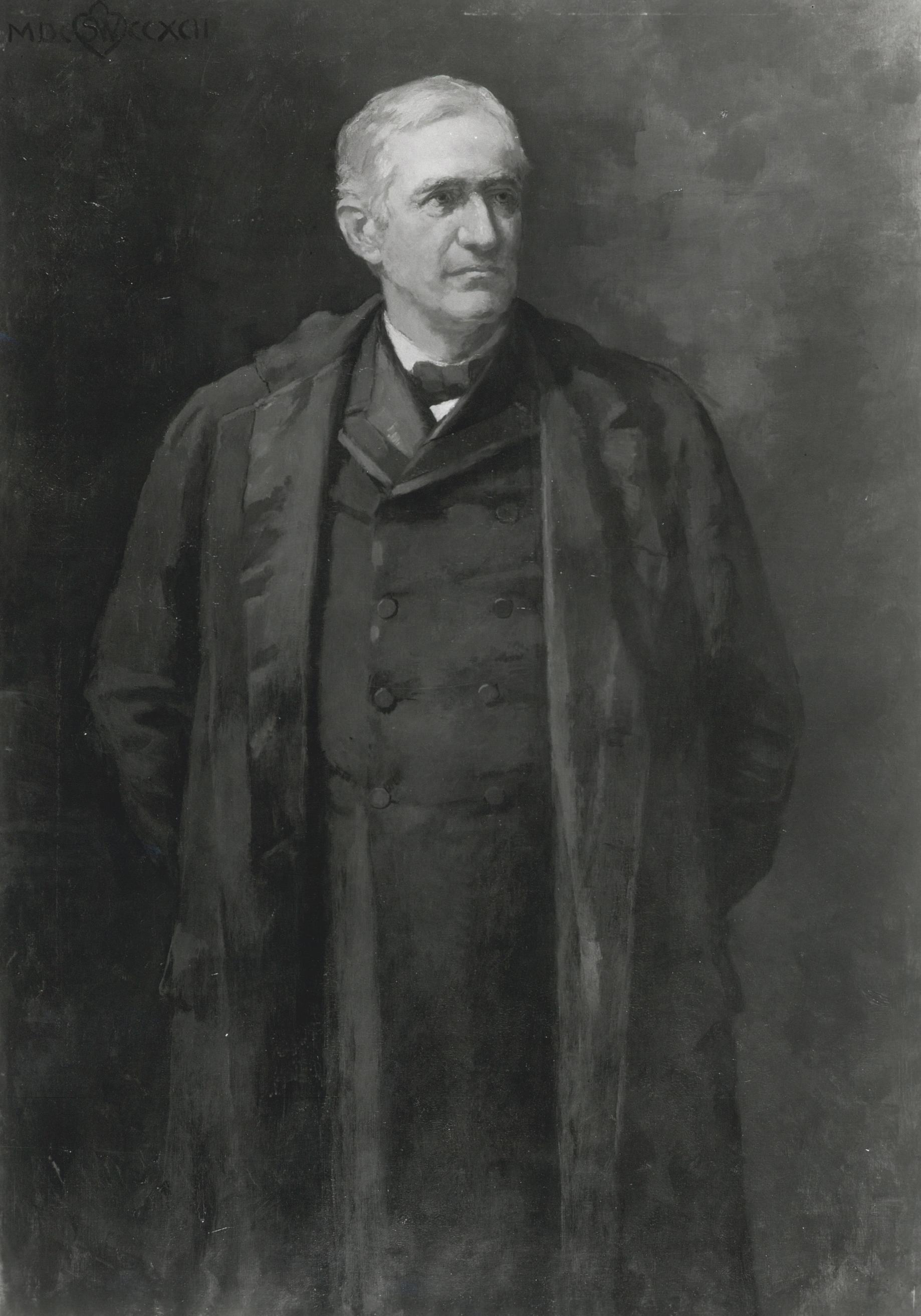
Portrait of Bayard as Secretary of State

Despite their agreement on Samoa, much of Bayard's term of office was taken up in settling disputes with the United Kingdom. The largest of these concerned the Canadian fisheries off the Atlantic coasts of Canada and Newfoundland. (Note: At the time, Newfoundland was a separate colony from Canada. Both were self-governing, but relied upon the British government for foreign policy.) The rights of American fishermen in Canadian waters had been disputed since American independence, but the most recent disagreement stemmed from Congress's decision in 1885 to abrogate part of the 1871 treaty that governed the situation. Under that treaty, American fishermen had the right to fish in Canadian waters; in return, fishermen from Canada and Newfoundland had the right to export fish to the United States duty-free. Protectionists in Congress thought the arrangement hurt American fisherman, and convinced their colleagues to repeal it. In response, Canadian authorities fell back on an interpretation of the earlier Treaty of 1818, and began to seize American vessels. In 1887, the lame duck 49th Congress then passed the Fisheries Retaliation Act, which empowered the president to bar Canadian ships from American ports if he thought Canadians were treating American fishermen "unjustly;" Cleveland signed the bill, but did not enforce it and hoped he and Bayard would be able to find a diplomatic solution to the escalating trade war.

Britain agreed to negotiate, and a six-member commission convened in Washington in June 1887. Bayard led the American delegation, joined by James Burrill Angell, president of the University of Michigan, and William LeBaron Putnam, a Maine lawyer and international law scholar. Joseph Chamberlain, a leading statesman in the British Parliament, led their delegation, which also included Lionel Sackville-West, the British ambassador to the United States, and Charles Tupper, a future Prime Minister of Canada. By February 1888, the commission agreed on a new treaty, which would create a mixed commission to determine which bays were open to American fishermen. Americans could purchase provisions and bait in Canada if they purchased a license, but if Canadian fisherman were allowed to sell their catch in the United States duty-free, then the Americans' licenses to fish in Canada would be free. Bayard believed that the treaty, "if observed honorably and honestly, will prevent future friction ... between the two nations." The Senate, controlled by Republicans, disagreed, and rejected the treaty by a 27–30 vote. Aware of the risk that the treaty might be rejected, Bayard and Chamberlain agreed on a two-year working agreement, allowing Americans to continue their fishing in Canadian waters by paying a fee. This arrangement was renewed every two years until 1912, when a permanent solution was found.

A similar dispute with Britain arose in the Pacific, over the rights of Canadians to hunt seals in waters off the Pribilof Islands, a part of Alaska. While only Americans had the right to take seals on the islands, the right to hunt in the waters around them was less well-defined, and Americans believed foreign sealers were depleting the herd too quickly by hunting off-shore. Bayard and Cleveland believed the waters around the islands to be exclusively American, but when Cleveland ordered the seizure of Canadian ships there, Bayard tried to convince him to search for a diplomatic solution instead. The situation remained unresolved when the administration left office in 1889, and remained so until the North Pacific Fur Seal Convention of 1911.

Relations with Britain were also impaired when Sackville-West intervened in the 1888 election. A Republican, posing as a British immigrant to the United States, asked Sackville-West whether voting for Cleveland or his Republican opponent, Benjamin Harrison, would best serve British interests. Sackville-West wrote that Cleveland was better for Britain; Republicans published the letter in October 1888, hoping to diminish Cleveland's popularity among Irish-Americans. Cleveland's cabinet discussed the matter and instructed Bayard to inform the ambassador his services would no longer be required in Washington. Bayard attempted to limit the electoral damage, and gave a speech in Baltimore condemning Republicans for scheming to portray Cleveland as a British tool. Cleveland was defeated for re-election the following month in a close election.

== Return to private life ==
Bayard's term as Secretary of State ended in March 1889 after Cleveland's defeat, and he returned to Wilmington to resume his law practice. He lived in "very comfortable circumstances" there, with a fortune estimated at $300,000, although his income from the law practice was modest. (Note: $300,000 in 1889 is equal to $10.8 million in present terms.) His wife having died in 1886, Bayard remarried in 1889 to Mary Willing Clymer, the granddaughter and namesake of the Philadelphia socialite Mary Willing Clymer. Bayard remained involved with Democratic politics and stayed informed on foreign affairs. When Cleveland was re-elected in 1892, many assumed Bayard would resume his position in the cabinet. Instead, Cleveland selected Judge Walter Q. Gresham of Indiana for the State Department and appointed Bayard Ambassador to Great Britain, the first American envoy to Britain to hold that rank (his predecessors had been envoys). Bayard accepted the appointment, which the Senate quickly confirmed.

== Ambassador to Great Britain ==
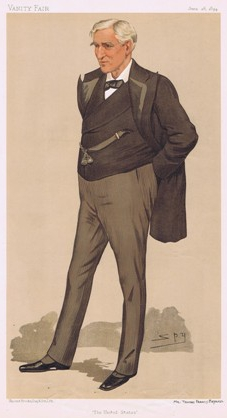
Bayard, as depicted in Vanity Fair in 1894 while ambassador to Britain

On June 12, 1893, Lord Rosebery, the British Foreign Secretary, received Bayard in London. Bayard began his tenure as ambassador with an "instinctive feeling of friendship for England," and a desire for peace and cooperation between the two nations. That desire was quickly impaired when Cleveland took the side of Venezuela when that nation insisted on taking a boundary dispute between it and British Guiana to international arbitration. The exact boundary had been in dispute for decades, but Britain had consistently denied any arbitration except over a small portion of the line; Venezuela wished the entire boundary included in any arbitration.

Bayard spent mid-1894 in the United States conferring with Gresham. The tension in the Venezuelan boundary dispute continued to escalate, while British disagreements with Nicaragua also threatened to involve the United States. Britain had once ruled the Caribbean coast of Nicaragua (the Mosquito Coast) but had abandoned it in 1860. Nicaragua had annexed the area while guaranteeing the inhabitants (the Miskito people) a degree of autonomy. When Nicaragua expanded their control of the area in 1894, the Miskito chief, Robert Henry Clarence, protested with the support of the British ambassador. Bayard agreed with Cleveland and Gresham that the British were not attempting to reestablish their colony, but Nicaraguans (and many Anglophobic Americans) saw a more sinister motive, including a possible British-controlled canal through Nicaragua. Returning to England, Bayard met with the new Foreign Secretary, Lord Kimberley, to emphasize Nicaragua's right to govern the area.

The tension over Nicaragua soon abated, but the May 1895 death of Secretary Gresham, who like Bayard had favored cooperation with the British, led to increased disagreement over the Venezuela issue. Cleveland appointed Richard Olney to take over the State Department, and Olney soon proved more confrontational than his predecessor. Olney's opinion, soon adopted by Cleveland, was that the Monroe Doctrine not only prohibited new European colonies, but also declared an American national interest in any matter of substance within the hemisphere. Olney drafted a long dispatch on the history of the problem, declaring that "to-day the United States is practically sovereign on this continent, and its fiat is law upon the subjects to which it confines its interposition ..." Bayard delivered the note to the British Prime Minister (Lord Salisbury, who was also serving as Foreign Secretary) on August 7, 1895.

Olney's note was met with vehement disagreement and delay, but when tempers cooled, the British agreed to arbitration later that year. Bayard disagreed with the bellicose tone of the message, which he attributed to an effort to satisfy Anglophobia among "Radical Republicans and the foolish Irishmen." Olney, for his part, thought Bayard soft-pedaled the note and asked Cleveland to remove Bayard from office, which Cleveland declined. The House of Representatives agreed with Olney, and passed a resolution of censure against Bayard in December 1895. Britain and Venezuela formally agreed to arbitration in February 1897, one month before the Cleveland administration came to an end. The panel's final judgement, delivered in 1899, awarded Britain almost all of the disputed territory.

== Death and legacy ==
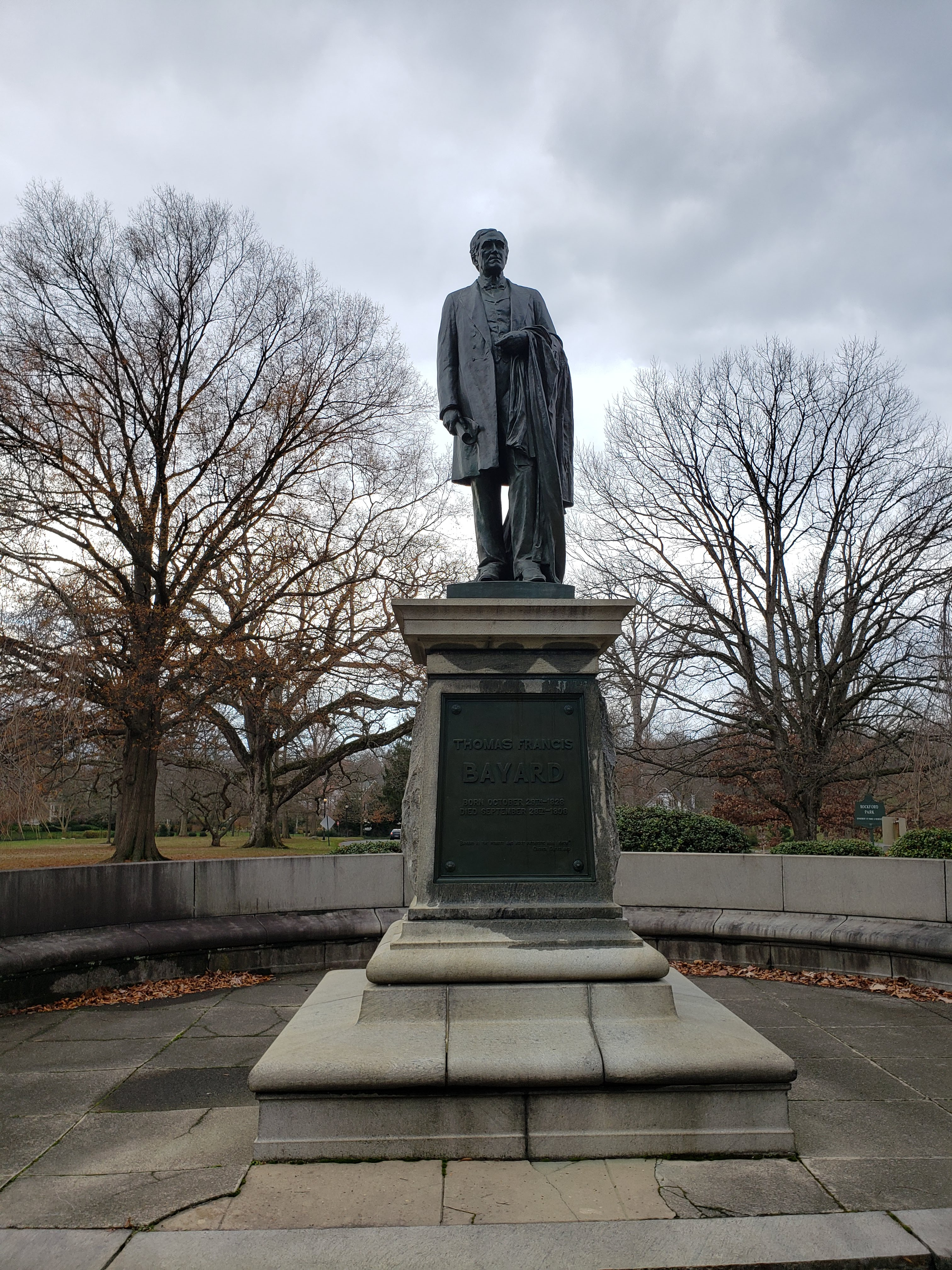
Thomas Bayard statue in Wilmington, Delaware

Bayard remained in London until the arrival of his successor, John Hay, in April 1897. That same year, he was elected to the American Philosophical Society. He returned to Wilmington that May and visited ex-President Cleveland at his home in Princeton the following month, remaining friendly with him despite their differences on the Venezuela question. Bayard's health had begun to decline in England, and he was often ill after his return to the United States. He died on September 28, 1898, while visiting his daughter Mabel Bayard Warren in Dedham, Massachusetts. Bayard was buried in the Old Swedes Episcopal Church Cemetery at Wilmington. He was survived by his second wife and seven of his twelve children, including Thomas F. Bayard Jr., who would serve in the United States Senate from 1922 to 1929 and his daughter, Florence Bayard Hilles a leading figure in the Women's suffrage movement and the founder of the National Woman's Party.

Thirteen years after his death, the 1911 Encyclopædia Britannica said of Bayard that "his tall dignified person, unfailing courtesy, and polished, if somewhat deliberate, eloquence made him a man of mark in all the best circles. He was considered indeed by many Americans to have become too partial to English ways; and, for the expression of some criticisms regarded as unfavorable to his own countrymen, the House of Representatives went so far as to pass ... a vote of censure on him. The value of Bayard's diplomacy was, however, fully recognized in the United Kingdom where he worthily upheld the traditions of a famous line of American ministers." In 1929, the Dictionary of American Biography described Bayard,as a Senator, as being "remembered rather for his opposition to Republican policies ... than for constructive legislation of the successful solution of great problems", and said that he had "the convictions of an earlier day ... and was never inclined, either politically or socially, to seek popularity with the country at large." Charles C. Tansill, a conservative historian, found much to praise in Bayard; he published a volume on Bayard's diplomatic career in 1940 and another about his congressional career in 1946, the only full-length biographies to appear since Bayard's death. Later historians took a dimmer view of Bayard's diplomatic career; in a 1989 book, Henry E. Mattox numbered Bayard among the Gilded Age foreign service officers who were "demonstrably incompetent."

In 1890, Bayard was elected as a charter member and the first state president for the Delaware chapter of the Sons of the American Revolution.

In 1924, Mount Bayard, a mountain along the United States–Canada border in southeast Alaska was named in his honor. Previously, the mountain was named Mount Lindeborg.

== See also ==
- Electoral history of Thomas F. Bayard

== Footnotes ==
U.S. Senate
Preceded by James A. Bayard Jr.	U.S. Senator (Class 1) from Delaware; 1869–1885; Served alongside: Willard Saulsbury Sr., Eli Saulsbury	Succeeded by George Gray
Preceded by Justin S. Morrill	Chair of the Senate Finance Committee; 1879–1881	Succeeded by Justin S. Morrill
Political offices
Preceded by Allen G. Thurman	President pro tempore of the United States Senate; 1881	Succeeded by David Davis
Preceded by Frederick T. Frelinghuysen	United States Secretary of State; 1885–1889	Succeeded by James G. Blaine
Diplomatic posts
Preceded by Robert Todd Lincoln as United States Minister to the United Kingdom	United States Ambassador to the United Kingdom; 1893–1897	Succeeded by John Hay
