= Electoral history of Thomas F. Bayard =

Thomas F. Bayard's time in the United States Senate

Thomas F. Bayard served sixteen years in the United States Senate. The Delaware General Assembly chose the U.S. Senators, who took office March 4, for a six-year term. The U.S. Secretary of State and U.S. Ambassadors are appointed by the President of the United States with the consent of the U.S. Senate.

Public offices
Office	Type	Location	Began office	Ended office	notes
U.S. Senator	Legislature	Washington	March 4, 1869	March 3, 1875	
U.S. Senator	Legislature	Washington	March 4, 1875	March 3, 1881	
U.S. Senator	Legislature	Washington	March 4, 1881	March 6, 1885	

United States Congressional service
Dates	Congress	Chamber	Majority	President	Committees	Class/District
1869–1871	41st	Senate	Republican	Ulysses S. Grant		class 1
1871–1873	42nd	Senate	Republican	Ulysses S. Grant		class 1
1873–1875	43rd	Senate	Republican	Ulysses S. Grant	Engrossed Bills	class 1
1875–1877	44th	Senate	Republican	Ulysses S. Grant	Engrossed Bills	class 1
1877–1879	45th	Senate	Republican	Rutherford B. Hayes	Engrossed Bills	class 1
1879–1881	46th	Senate	Democratic	Rutherford B. Hayes	Finance, Chair; Judiciary	class 1
1881–1883	47th	Senate	Democratic	James A. Garfield; Chester A. Arthur	Private Land Claims	class 1
1883–1885	48th	Senate	Republican	Chester A. Arthur	Private Land Claims	class 1
1885–1887	49th	Senate	Republican	Grover Cleveland		class 1
