= Richard Olney =

American statesman (1835–1917)

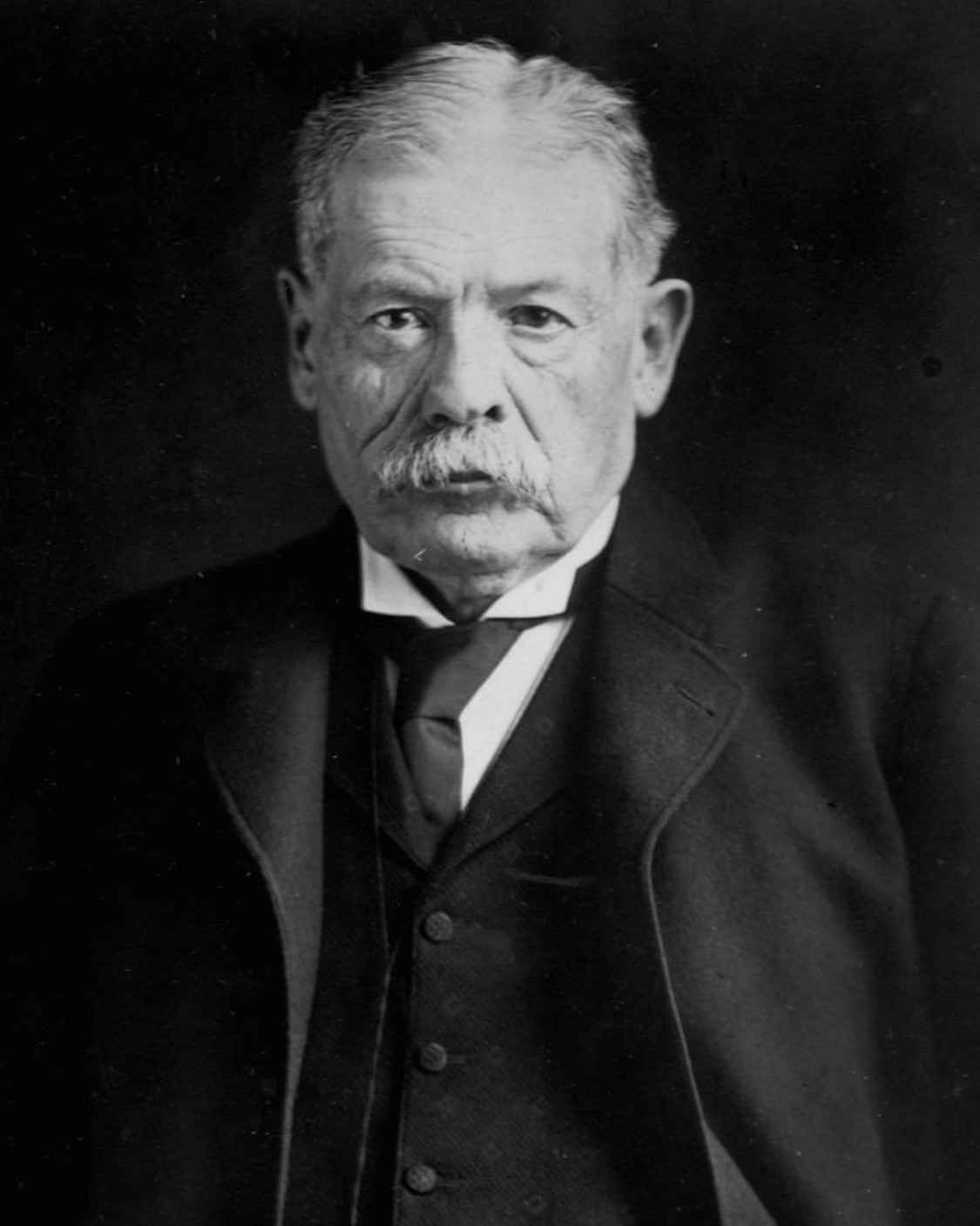
- Olney c. 1890

34th United States Secretary of State
- In office June 10, 1895 – March 5, 1897
- President: Grover Cleveland; William McKinley
- Preceded by: Walter Q. Gresham
- Succeeded by: John Sherman

40th United States Attorney General
- In office March 6, 1893 – June 10, 1895
- President: Grover Cleveland
- Preceded by: William H. H. Miller
- Succeeded by: Judson Harmon

Member of the Massachusetts House of Representatives from the 2nd Norfolk district
- In office January 7, 1874 – January 6, 1875
- Preceded by: Robert Seaver
- Succeeded by: Joseph S. Ropes

Personal details
- Born: September 15, 1835 Oxford, Massachusetts, U.S.
- Died: April 8, 1917 (aged 81) Boston, Massachusetts, U.S.
- Resting place: Mount Auburn Cemetery
- Party: Democratic
- Spouse: Agnes Park Thomas
- Education: Brown University (BA); Harvard University (LLB)

Richard Olney (September 15, 1835 – April 8, 1917) was an American attorney, statesman, and Democratic Party politician who served as a member of the second cabinet of President Grover Cleveland as the 40th United States Attorney General from 1893 to 1895 and 34th Secretary of State from 1895 to 1897.

As attorney general, Olney used injunctions against striking workers in the Pullman strike, setting a precedent, and advised the use of federal troops, when legal means failed to control the strikers.

As Secretary of State, Olney mediated the Venezuelan crisis of 1895 and managed Cleveland's anti-expansionist policy in response to the overthrow of the Hawaiian Kingdom and the Cuban War of Independence, though both Hawaii and Cuba were annexed during the subsequent William McKinley administration. He raised the status of America in the world by elevating U.S. diplomatic posts to the status of embassy.

== Early life and education ==
Olney was born into a prosperous family in Oxford, Massachusetts. His father was Wilson Olney, a textiles manufacturer and banker. Shortly after his birth, the family moved to Louisville, Kentucky, and lived there until Olney was seven. The family then moved back to Oxford and Olney attended school at the Leicester Academy in Leicester, Massachusetts.

He graduated with high honors as class orator from Brown University in 1856. He received a Bachelor of Laws degree from Harvard Law School in 1858.

In 1859, he passed the bar and began practicing law in Boston, attaining a reputation as an authority on probate, trust and corporate law.

== Early career ==
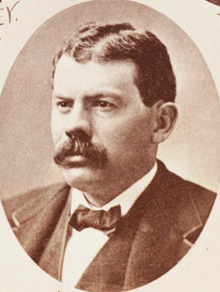
Olney as a Massachusetts State Representative in 1874.

Olney was elected a selectman in West Roxbury, Massachusetts and served one term in the Massachusetts House of Representatives in 1874, serving as a member of the Committee on the Judiciary. He declined to run again, preferring to return to his law practice.

In 1876, Olney inherited his father-in-law's Boston law practice and became involved in the business affairs of Boston's elite families.

During the 1880s, Olney became one of the Boston's leading railroad attorneys and the general counsel for Chicago, Milwaukee and St. Paul Railway.

Olney was once asked by a former railroad employer if he could do something to get rid of the newly formed Interstate Commerce Commission (ICC). He suggested that the ICC would become a captive regulator, replying in an 1892 letter, "The Commission... is, or can be made, of great use to the railroads. It satisfies the popular clamor for a government supervision of the railroads, at the same time that that supervision is almost entirely nominal. Further, the older such a commission gets to be, the more inclined it will be found to take the business and railroad view of things... The part of wisdom is not to destroy the Commission, but to utilize it."

== Attorney General ==
In March 1893, Olney became U.S. Attorney General and used the law to thwart strikes, which he considered an illegitimate tactic contrary to law. Olney argued that the government must prevent interference with its mails and with the general railway transportation between the states.

=== Pullman strike ===
During the 1894 Pullman strike, Olney instructed district attorneys to secure from the Federal Courts writs of injunction against striking railroad employees. He ordered the Chicago district attorney to convene a grand jury to find cause to indict Eugene Debs and other labor leaders and sent federal marshals to protect rail traffic, ordering 150 marshals deputized in Helena, Montana alone.

When the legal measures failed, he advised President Cleveland to send federal troops to Chicago to quell the strike, over the objections of the Governor of Illinois.

In comparison to his $8,000 compensation as Attorney General, Olney had been a railroad attorney and had a $10,000 retainer from the Chicago, Burlington, and Quincy Railroad. Olney got an injunction from circuit court justices Peter S. Grosscup and William Allen Woods (both anti-union) prohibiting ARU officials from "compelling or encouraging" any impacted railroad employees "to refuse or fail to perform any of their duties." The injunction was disobeyed by Debs and other ARU leaders, and federal forces were dispatched to enforce it. Debs, who had been hesitant to start the strike, put all of his efforts into it. He called on ARU members to ignore the federal court injunctions and the U.S. Army.

== Secretary of State ==
Upon the death of Secretary of State Walter Q. Gresham, Cleveland named Olney to the position on June 10, 1895.

Olney quickly elevated US foreign diplomatic posts to the title of embassy, officially raising the status of the United States to one of the world's greater nations. (Until then, the United States had had only Legations, which diplomatic protocol dictated be treated as inferior to embassies.)

Olney took a prominent role in the boundary dispute between the British and Venezuelan governments. In his correspondence with Lord Salisbury, he gave an extended interpretation of the Monroe Doctrine that went considerably beyond previous statements on the subject, now known as the Olney interpretation.

== Later years and death ==
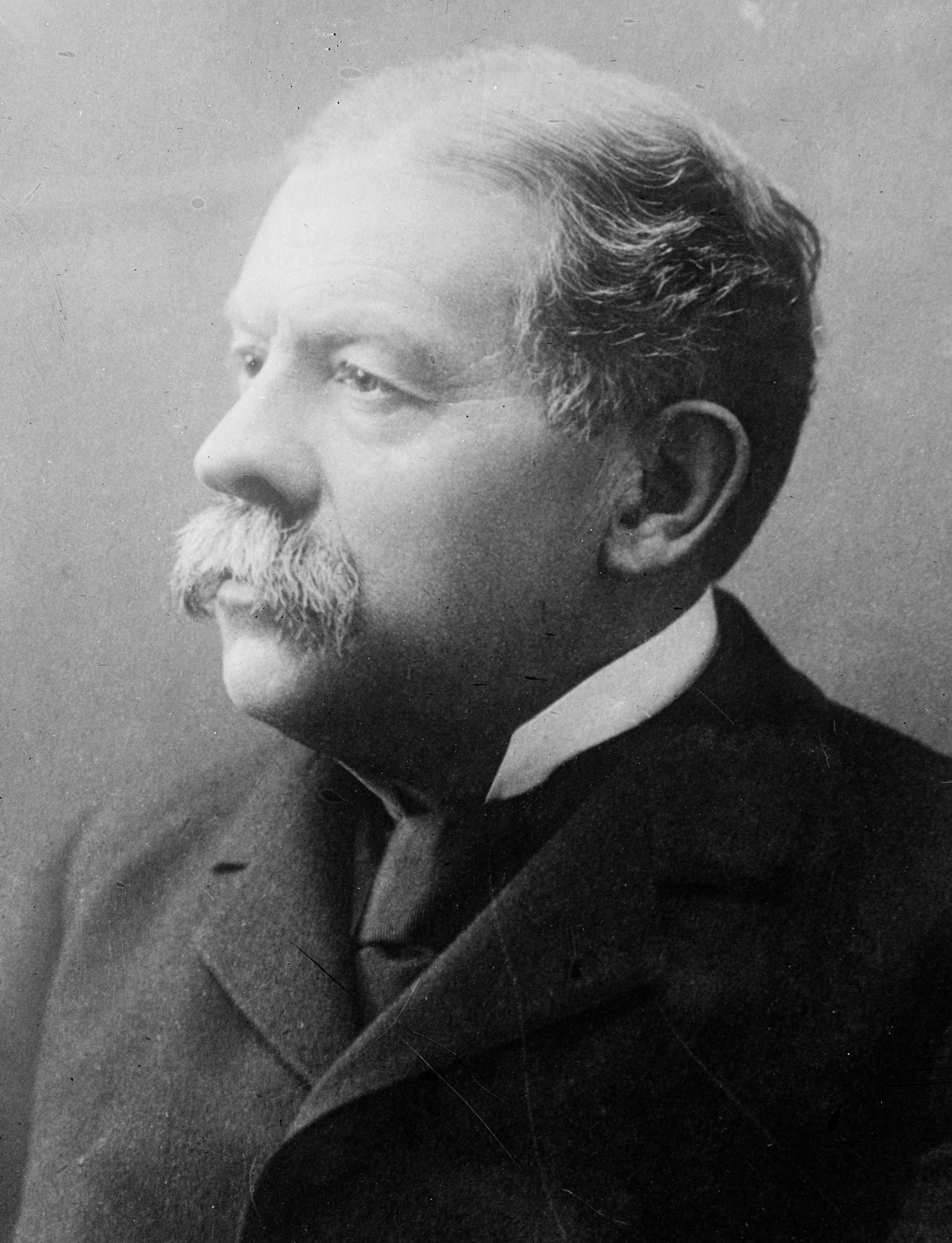
Portrait of Olney c. 1913.

Olney returned to the practice of the law in 1897, at the expiration of Cleveland's term.

In March 1913, Olney turned down President Wilson's offer to be the US Ambassador to Great Britain, and later, in May 1914, when President Wilson offered Olney the Appointment as Governor of the Federal Reserve Board, he declined that appointment. Olney was unwilling to take on new responsibilities at his advanced age.

He died in 1917 at the age of 81.

== Personal life ==
In 1861, Olney married Agnes Park Thomas of Boston, Massachusetts.

Olney was the uncle of Massachusetts Congressman Richard Olney II.

Author H.W. Brands recounts claims that Olney "responded to a daughter's indiscretion by banishing her from his home, never to see her again, although they lived in the same city for thirty years."

=== Honors ===
Olney received the honorary degree of LL.D from Harvard and Brown in 1893 and from Yale University in 1901. He was elected to the American Philosophical Society in 1897.

== Bibliography ==
- Grenville, John A. S. and George Berkeley Young. Politics, Strategy, and American Diplomacy: Studies in Foreign Policy, 1873-1917 (1966) pp 158–78 on "Grover Cleveland, Richard Olney, and the Venezuelan Crisis"
- Young, George B. "Intervention Under the Monroe Doctrine: The Olney Corollary," Political Science Quarterly, 57#2 (1942), pp. 247–280 in JSTOR

Legal offices
Preceded by William H. H. Miller	U.S. Attorney General; Served under: Grover Cleveland; 1893–1895	Succeeded by Judson Harmon
Political offices
Preceded by Walter Q. Gresham	U.S. Secretary of State; Served under: Grover Cleveland; 1895–1897	Succeeded by John Sherman
