= Olney interpretation =

Former American legal opinion

Olney Corollary
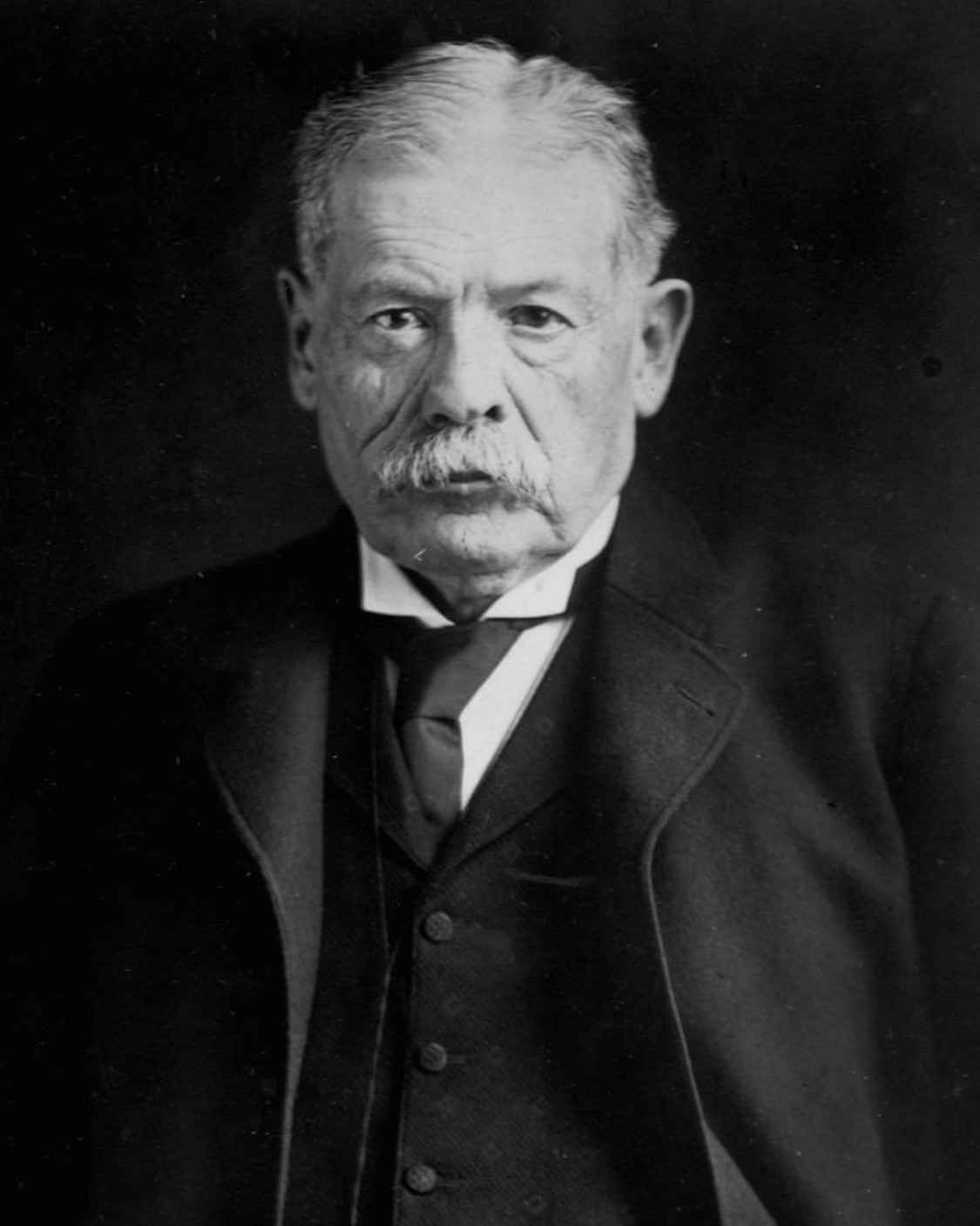
- U.S. Secretary of State Richard Olney, author of the declaration
- Date effective: July 20, 1895
- Signatories: Richard Olney (on behalf of the Grover Cleveland administration)
- Purpose: Part of Venezuelan crisis of 1895; To expand the Monroe Doctrine to grant the United States authority to arbitrate boundary disputes in the Western Hemisphere and declare practical U.S. sovereignty.

The Olney interpretation (also known as the Olney corollary or Olney declaration) was United States Secretary of State Richard Olney's interpretation of the Monroe Doctrine. During a border dispute between British Guiana and Venezuela, Olney claimed in 1895 that the Monroe Doctrine gave the United States authority to mediate border disputes in the Western Hemisphere. He extended the meaning of the Monroe Doctrine, which had previously stated merely that the Western Hemisphere was closed to additional European colonization: "Today the United States is practically sovereign on this continent and its fiat is law upon the subjects to which it confines its interposition... He further said:

The declaration of the Monroe message—that existing colonies or dependencies of an European power would not be interfered with by the United States—means colonies or dependencies then existing, with their limits as then existing. So it has been invariably construed, and so it must continue to be construed unless it is to be deprived of all vital force. Great Britain cannot be deemed a South American state within the purview of the Monroe doctrine, nor, if she is appropriating Venezuelan territory, is it material that she does so by advancing the frontier of an old colony instead of by the planting of a new colony.

The border dispute was settled by arbitration in 1897, and the Olney interpretation was defunct by 1933.

== Sources ==
- George B. Young, "Intervention Under the Monroe Doctrine: The Olney Corollary," Political Science Quarterly, Vol. 57, No. 2 (Jun., 1942), pp. 247–280 in JSTOR
