= 184th Regiment =

184th Regiment may refer to:

- 184th Paratroopers Regiment "Nembo"
- 184th Artillery Regiment "Nembo"
- 184th Infantry Regiment (United States)
- 184th Warsaw Infantry Regiment
- 184th Reconnaissance Aviation Regiment

== American Civil War regiments ==
- 184th Ohio Infantry Regiment
- 184th Pennsylvania Infantry Regiment

== See also ==
- 184th Division (disambiguation)
- 184th (disambiguation)
