= William F. Vilas =

American lawyer and politician (1840–1908)

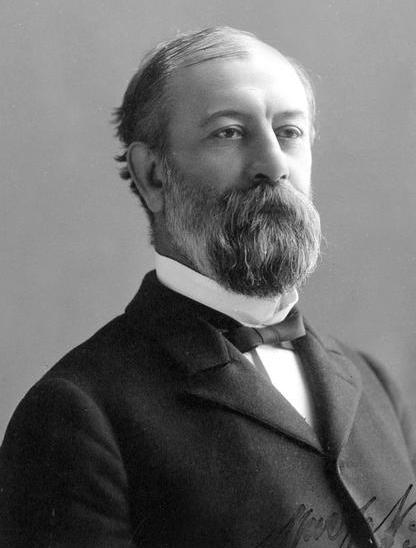

United States Senator from Wisconsin
- In office March 4, 1891 – March 3, 1897
- Preceded by: John Coit Spooner
- Succeeded by: John Coit Spooner

17th United States Secretary of the Interior
- In office January 16, 1888 – March 6, 1889
- President: Grover Cleveland; Benjamin Harrison
- Preceded by: Lucius Lamar
- Succeeded by: John Willock Noble

33rd United States Postmaster General
- In office March 6, 1885 – January 6, 1888
- President: Grover Cleveland
- Preceded by: Frank Hatton
- Succeeded by: Donald M. Dickinson

Member of the Wisconsin State Assembly from the Dane 1st district
- In office January 5, 1885 – March 9, 1885
- Preceded by: Dexter Curtis
- Succeeded by: Michael J. Cantwell

Personal details
- Born: William Freeman Vilas; July 9, 1840 Chelsea, Vermont, U.S.
- Died: August 27, 1908 (aged 68) Madison, Wisconsin, U.S.
- Resting place: Forest Hill Cemetery; Madison, Wisconsin, U.S.
- Party: Democratic; National Democratic (1896)
- Spouse: Anna M. Fox (m. 1866–1908)
- Relations: Levi M. Vilas (brother)
- Children: Cornelia Vilas^{(b. 1867; died 1893)}; Henry Vilas^{(b. 1872; died 1899)}; Mary Esther (Hanks)^{(b. 1873; died 1959)}
- Parent: Levi Baker Vilas (father)
- Education: University of Wisconsin, Madison (BA); Albany Law School (LLB)

Military service
- Allegiance: United States
- Branch/service: United States Volunteers; Union Army
- Years of service: 1862–1863
- Rank: Lieutenant Colonel, USV
- Unit: 23rd Reg. Wis. Vol. Infantry
- Battles/wars: American Civil War; Vicksburg campaign

William Freeman Vilas (July 9, 1840 – August 27, 1908) was an American lawyer, politician, and United States senator. In the U.S. Senate, he represented the state of Wisconsin for one term, from 1891 to 1897. As a prominent Bourbon Democrat, he was also a member of the cabinet of U.S. President Grover Cleveland, serving as the 33rd Postmaster General and the 17th Secretary of the Interior.

He was a major donor to the University of Wisconsin, leaving $30,000,000 to the school at his death in 1908. He is the namesake of Vilas Hall on the University of Wisconsin–Madison campus, as well as Vilas County, Wisconsin, and the towns of Vilas, Colorado, and Vilas, South Dakota.

== Early life and education ==
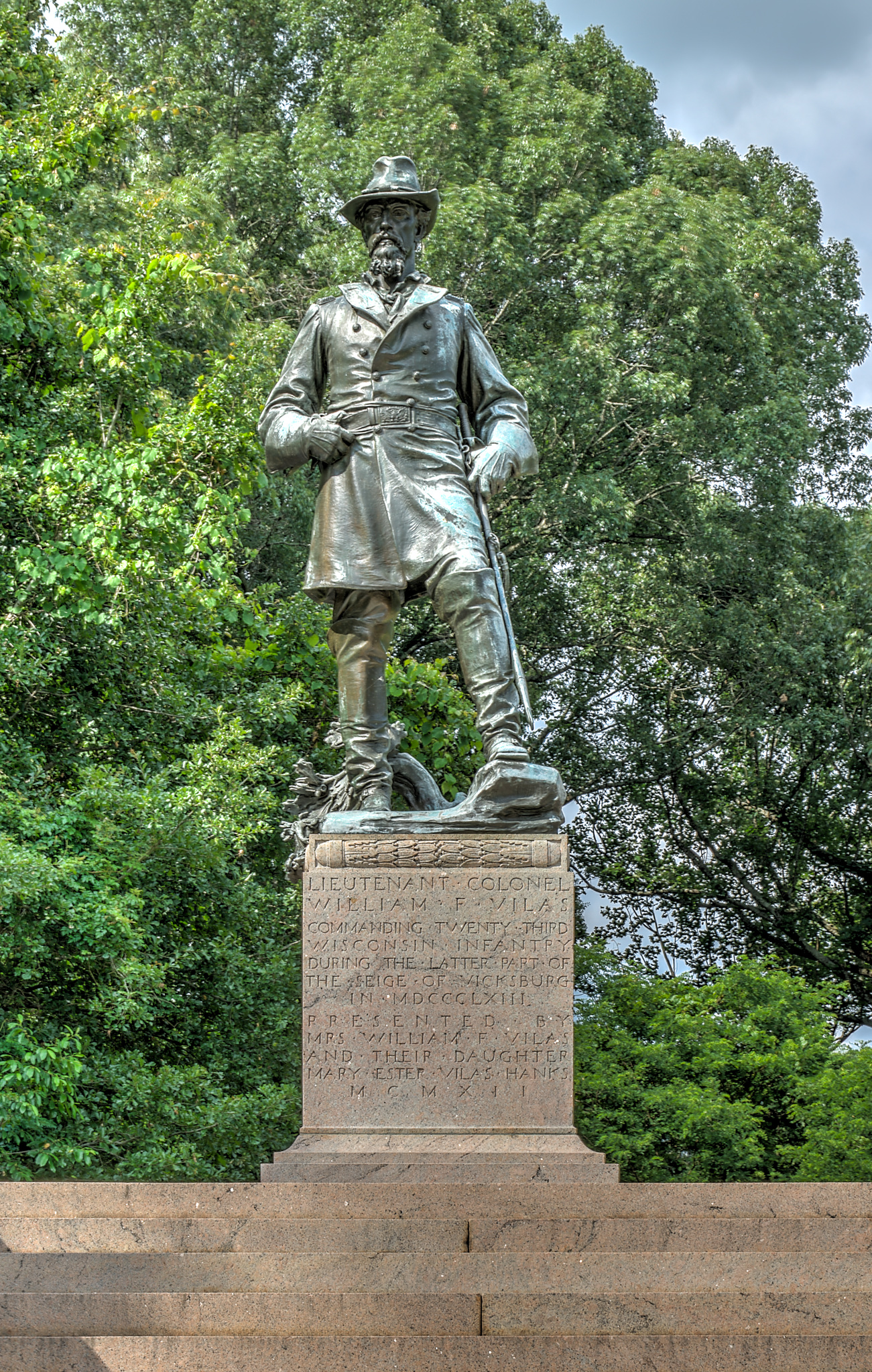
Statue of Vilas at Vicksburg National Military Park

Vilas was born in Chelsea, Vermont, the son of Esther Greene (Smilie) and Levi Baker Vilas, a politician. His grandfather was Nathan Smilie, a Democratic politician who ran for Governor of Vermont in 1839. Vilas moved to Madison, Wisconsin, with his family in 1851. He graduated from the University of Wisconsin in 1858, and from the Albany Law School in 1860.

== Career ==
He enlisted in the Union Army during the Civil War and was a captain in the 23rd Wisconsin Volunteer Infantry Regiment and later served as the lieutenant colonel of that regiment.

Following the war, Vilas was a professor of law at the University of Wisconsin–Madison, and a regent of the university from 1880 to 1885 and 1898 to 1905. Vilas served as a member of the Wisconsin State Assembly in 1885, until he was appointed the postmaster general between 1885 and 1888, and as secretary of the interior from 1888 to 1889, both under President Grover Cleveland.

After leaving the cabinet, he led Wisconsin German Americans in the protest against the Bennett Law of 1889 which required schools to only use the English language. From 1891 until 1897, he was a member of the United States Senate, in which, during President Cleveland's second term, he was recognized as the chief defender of the Administration, and he was especially active in securing the repeal of the silver purchase clause of the Sherman Silver Purchase Act. He was unsuccessful in an 1896 reelection bid, having been defeated by Senator John Coit Spooner, who held the seat before him and whom Vilas had defeated for reelection in 1890.

Vilas was a delegate to the Democratic National Convention of 1896, but withdrew after the adoption of the free-silver plank. He then became one of the chief organizers of the National Democratic Party, attended the convention at Indianapolis, and was chairman of its committee on resolutions. He was also the main drafter of the National Democratic Party's platform. Vilas, a favorite of the delegates, refused to run as the party's sacrificial lamb. His convention speech immediately preceded William Jennings Bryan's breakthrough "Cross of Gold" speech.

Back in Wisconsin, he was from 1897 to 1903 a member of the commission that had charge of the erection of the State Historical Library at Madison, and from 1906 to 1908 of the commission for the construction of the new state capitol.

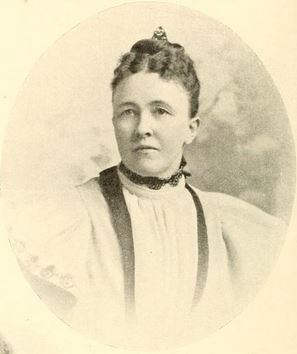
Anna M. Fox

== Personal life ==
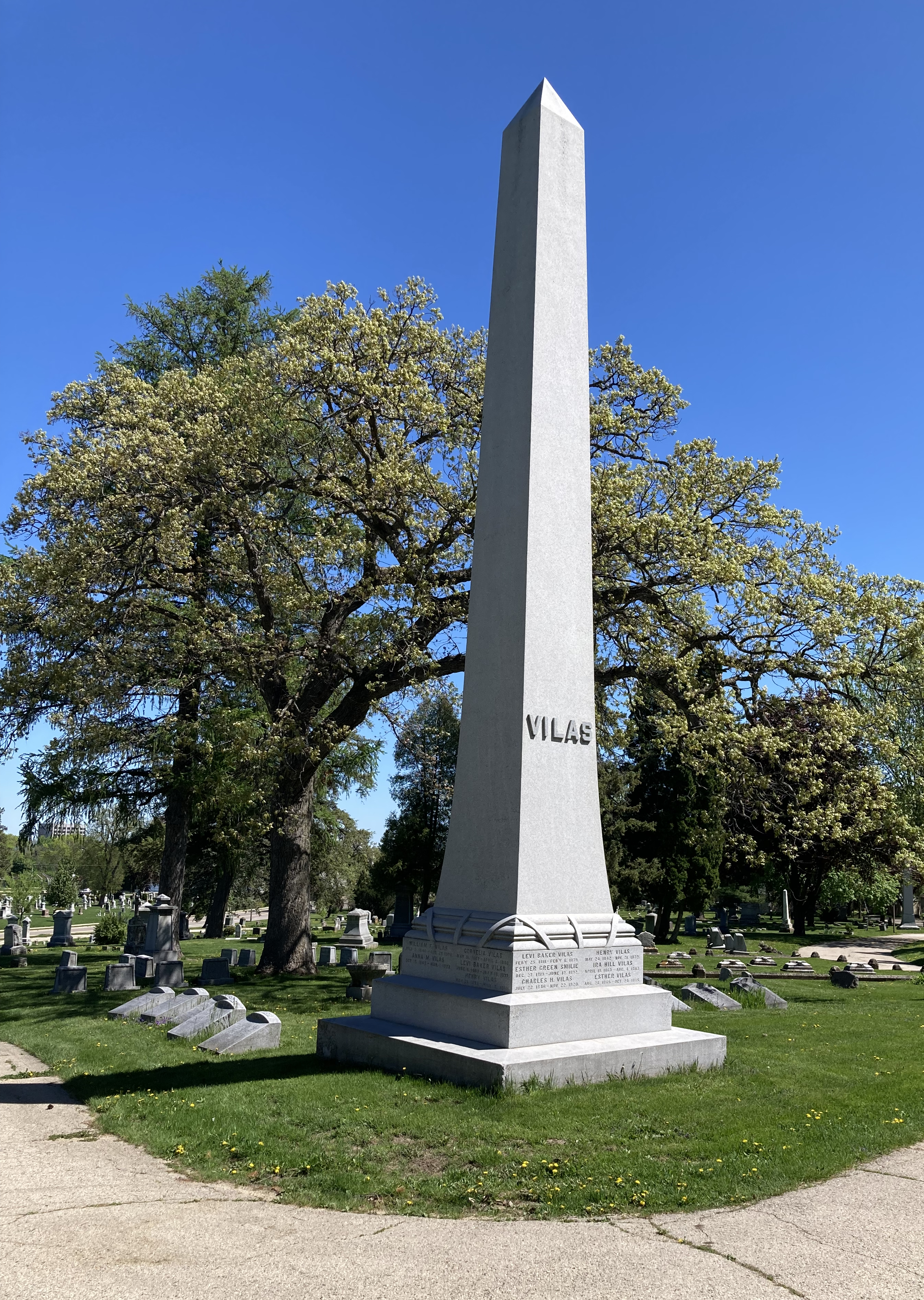
Vilas's grave at Forest Hill Cemetery

He married Anna M. Fox, who had been born in the territory of Wisconsin. Their younger son, Levi Baker, died in early childhood and their elder daughter, Nellie, died in 1893. Their older son, Henry, died in 1899 at the age of 27 from complications related to diabetes.

William and Anna were survived by their younger daughter Mary Esther. He is interred at the Forest Hill Cemetery in Madison, Wisconsin.

=== Legacy ===
Vilas County, Wisconsin, is named for William F. Vilas. Senator Vilas is also the namesake of the towns of Vilas, Colorado and Vilas, South Dakota. His childhood home in Madison is located in what is now the Langdon Street Historic District. His family donated land to the city of Madison to build a public park, which later became a part of the Henry Vilas Zoo.

== Sources ==
- United States Congress. "William F. Vilas (id: V000099)". Biographical Directory of the United States Congress. Retrieved on February 15, 2008

Military offices
Preceded by Col. Joshua James Guppey	Command of the 23rd Wisconsin Infantry Regiment; June 5, 1863 – August 25, 1863	Succeeded by Lt. Col. Edgar P. Hill
Wisconsin State Assembly
Preceded by Dexter Curtis	Member of the Wisconsin State Assembly from the Dane 1st district January 5, 1885 – March 9, 1885	Succeeded by Michael J. Cantwell
U.S. Senate
Preceded by John C. Spooner	United States Senator (Class 3) from Wisconsin; 1891–1897 with Philetus Sawyer (1891–1893); John L. Mitchell (1893–1897)	Succeeded by John C. Spooner
Political offices
Preceded by Frank Hatton	United States Postmaster General; Served under: Grover Cleveland; 1885–1888	Succeeded by Donald M. Dickinson
Preceded by Lucius Q.C. Lamar	U.S. Secretary of the Interior; Served under: Grover Cleveland; 1888–1889	Succeeded by John W. Noble
