= Frank Hatton (American politician) =

American politician and newspaperman (1846–1894)

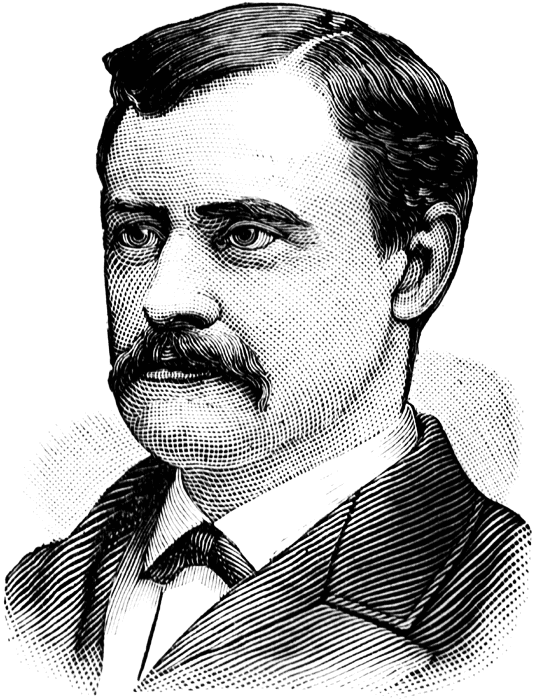

32nd United States Postmaster General
- In office October 14, 1884 – March 4, 1885
- President: Chester A. Arthur
- Preceded by: Walter Q. Gresham
- Succeeded by: William Vilas

18th First Assistant United States Postmaster General
- In office October 22, 1881 – October 13, 1884
- Preceded by: James Noble Tyner
- Succeeded by: John Schuyler Crosby

Personal details
- Born: April 28, 1846 Cambridge, Ohio, U.S.
- Died: April 30, 1894 (aged 48) Washington, D.C., U.S.
- Resting place: Rock Creek Cemetery; Washington, D.C., U.S.
- Party: Republican
- Spouse: Elizabeth J. Snyder (m. 1867)
- Children: 1
- Profession: Newspaper editor and publisher

Military service
- Allegiance: United States (Union)
- Branch/service: Union Army
- Years of service: 1862–1865
- Rank: First lieutenant
- Unit: 98th Ohio Volunteer Infantry Regiment; 184th Ohio Volunteer Infantry Regiment
- Battles/wars: American Civil War

Frank Hatton (April 28, 1846 – April 30, 1894) was an American politician and newspaperman. He was a Union Army veteran of the American Civil War, served as United States Postmaster General, and later edited The Washington Post.

== Early life ==
Hatton was born in Cambridge, Ohio on April 28, 1846, a son of Richard Hatton and Sarah (Green) Hatton. He was raised and educated in Cadiz, Ohio and apprenticed to his father, who was a printer and newspaper publisher.

== Civil War ==
Though he was only 16 years old, in 1862 Hatton enlisted for the American Civil War as a private in Company C, 98th Ohio Volunteer Infantry Regiment. His unit served primarily with the Army of the Cumberland, and Hatton took part in numerous engagements including the Battle of Atlanta. In 1864, he was commissioned as a first lieutenant and he served with the 184th Ohio Infantry before being mustered out at the end of the war.

After the war, Hatton was an original member of the Military Order of the Loyal Legion of the United States. In addition, he was also one of the organizers of the Grand Army of the Republic in Ohio.

== Early career ==
After the war, Hatton worked in the newspaper business in Mount Pleasant, Iowa and later in Burlington, Iowa. A Republican who was active as a member of the Stalwart faction, he served as Burlington's Postmaster, and held several party positions, including Chairman of the Iowa Republican Party's Central Committee.

== Political career ==
In 1881, Hatton was a candidate for several federal appointments at the start of the James A. Garfield administration. Garfield died that summer and in October, Hatton was appointed First Assistant Postmaster General during Chester A. Arthur's presidency.

In 1884 he was promoted to Postmaster General when incumbent Walter Q. Gresham became Secretary of the Treasury.

Hatton worked unsuccessfully to nominate President Arthur for a full term at the 1884 Republican National Convention. The nomination was won by James G. Blaine, who went on to lose the general election to Democrat Grover Cleveland. Hatton left office at the end of Arthur's term and returned to the newspaper business.

== Later career ==
Hatton was part-owner and editor of The Washington Post until April 24, 1894, when he was stricken with a massive stroke while working at his desk. Hatton experienced complete paralysis, and was transported to a hospital, where his condition continued to decline.

== Death and burial ==
He died on April 30, 1894, a week after his stroke and two days after his 48th birthday. He was interred in Rock Creek Cemetery in Washington, D.C.

== Family ==
In 1867, Hatton married Elizabeth J. Snyder (1844-1944) of Mount Pleasant Iowa. They were the parents of a son, Richard Hatton (1872-1939).

== Legacy ==
The town of Hatton, North Dakota was founded in 1882, and is named for Frank Hatton.

Political offices
Preceded by Walter Q. Gresham	United States Postmaster General; Served under: Chester A. Arthur; October 14, 1884 – March 4, 1885	Succeeded by William F. Vilas
