= Michael J. Cantwell =

19th century American politician

Member of the Wisconsin State Assembly from the Dane 1st district
- In office March 25, 1885 – January 7, 1889
- Preceded by: William Freeman Vilas
- Succeeded by: David Stephens

Personal details
- Born: April 1, 1837 Ireland, UK
- Died: December 1, 1903 (aged 66) Madison, Wisconsin, U.S.
- Resting place: Resurrection Cemetery, Madison, Wisconsin
- Party: Democratic
- Spouse: Catherine C. Byrne
- Children: Frank W. Cantwell^{(b. 1865; died 1940)}; John Reynolds Cantwell^{(b. 1875; died 1940)}; Joseph M. Cantwell^{(b. 1876; died 1900)}; Catherine Isabelle (O'Neill)^{(b. 1877; died 1959)}; Gretta Cantwell^{(b. 1879; died 1882)}

Military service
- Allegiance: United States
- Branch/service: United States Volunteers; Union Army
- Years of service: 1861–1865
- Rank: 1st Lieutenant, USV
- Unit: 1st Reg. Wis. Vol. Infantry; 12th Reg. Wis. Vol. Infantry
- Battles/wars: American Civil War

Michael J. Cantwell (April 1, 1837 – December 1, 1903) was an Irish American immigrant, printer, politician, and Wisconsin pioneer. He was a member of the Wisconsin State Assembly, representing the capital city of Madison in the 1885 and 1887 sessions. He also served as a Union Army officer through most of the American Civil War.

== Biography ==
Born in Ireland, Cantwell emigrated to the United States in 1849 and settled in Madison, Wisconsin. He worked as a printer for the newspaper Wisconsin Express, which later became the Wisconsin State Journal.

== Civil War service ==
At the outbreak of the American Civil War, Cantwell joined up with the "Madison Guard" militia company, the first Wisconsin company enrolled in the Union Army. They became Company E of the 1st Wisconsin Infantry Regiment. The 1st Wisconsin Infantry went east to Washington, D.C., and engaged in the Battle of Hoke's Run, but their three month enlistment expired in August 1861, and the unit returned to Wisconsin.

Cantwell re-enlisted and was commissioned second lieutenant of Company C in the 12th Wisconsin Infantry Regiment in November 1861. He was promoted to first lieutenant six months later and served with the 12th Wisconsin Infantry through most of the rest of the war. He served in the western theater of the war, participating in the critical Vicksburg campaign, and the subsequent march with General William Tecumseh Sherman against Atlanta. Cantwell also served as acting quartermaster of the brigade. He mustered out in January 1865 at the expiration of his three year enlistment.

== Postbellum career ==
After the war, he founded the Cantwell Printing Company, which he operated for 25 years. He was also involved with the Wisconsin Agricultural Society, the Dane County Agricultural Society, and the Wisconsin Historical Society. Cantwell served as Madison City Treasurer and on the Madison Common Council.

In March 1885, he won a special election to serve in the Wisconsin State Assembly for the remainder of the 37th Wisconsin Legislature. He replaced William Freeman Vilas, who had been appointed United States Postmaster General. He subsequently won re-election in 1886 and served in the 38th Wisconsin Legislature. Cantwell was a member of the Democratic Party. He did not run for re-election in 1888.

Cantwell died suddenly at his home in Madison, Wisconsin, in December 1903.

Wisconsin State Assembly
Preceded by Dexter Curtis	Member of the Wisconsin State Assembly from the Dane 1st district March 25, 1885 – January 7, 1889	Succeeded by David Stephens
