= Donald M. Dickinson =

American politician and lawyer (1846–1917)

Donald Dickinson
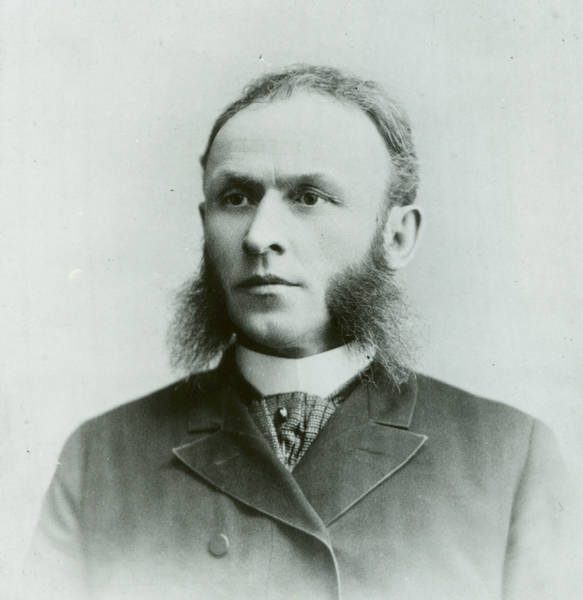

34th United States Postmaster General
- In office January 6, 1888 – March 4, 1889
- President: Grover Cleveland
- Preceded by: William Freeman Vilas
- Succeeded by: John Wanamaker

Personal details
- Born: January 17, 1846 Oswego County, New York, U.S.
- Died: October 15, 1917 (aged 71) Detroit, Michigan, U.S.
- Party: Democratic
- Education: University of Michigan, Ann Arbor (LLB)

Donald McDonald Dickinson (January 17, 1846 – October 15, 1917) was a lawyer and politician from the U.S. state of Michigan.

== Biography ==
Dickinson was born in the town of Richland, Oswego County, New York, on January 17, 1846, the son of Asa Case Dickinson and Minerva Holmes. His family moved to Michigan when he was two years old. He graduated from the University of Michigan Law School in 1867 and built a very successful practice in Detroit, frequently arguing cases before the Supreme Court of the United States.

In 1872, Dickinson established himself in state politics by working to effectively organize the Democratic Party in what at the time was a heavily Republican state. He was a member of Democratic National Committee from Michigan 1880–1885, and was an early supporter of the candidacy of Grover Cleveland for President in 1884. After the election, Cleveland offered Dickinson a position on the recently created Civil Service Commission, but he declined. However, in 1887, Dickinson accepted the appointment as United States Postmaster General, serving from January 6, 1888, until the end of Cleveland's first term in 1889. A railroad strike soon after Dickinson took office interrupted postal service in the nation. Dickinson refused to use federal forces to break the strike and instead modified the distribution routes so that postal deliveries could continue. At Cleveland's request, Dickinson applied civil service reforms to hiring practices to minimize the effect of patronage on the postal service.

Following Cleveland's defeat, Dickinson returned to the practice of law in Detroit. He subsequently headed Michigan's delegation to the 1892 Democratic National Convention which renominated Cleveland. Dickinson split with the Democratic Party over William Jennings Bryan's ascendancy and his monetary proposals. Dickinson supported the Republican ticket of William McKinley and Theodore Roosevelt in 1900 and also supported Roosevelt's unsuccessful run as a third party candidate in 1912.

He died in Detroit on October 15, 1917, and is interred at Elmwood Cemetery. Dickinson County, Michigan, is named for him.

== Notes ==
Political offices
Preceded by William Freeman Vilas	United States Postmaster General; Served under: Grover Cleveland; January 6, 1888 – March 4, 1889	Succeeded by John Wanamaker
