= David Stephens (Wisconsin politician) =

19th century American politician

Member of the Wisconsin State Assembly from the Dane 1st district
- In office January 7, 1889 – January 5, 1891
- Preceded by: Michael J. Cantwell
- Succeeded by: Harry E. Briggs

Personal details
- Born: July 20, 1837 Kincardineshire, Scotland, UK
- Died: April 3, 1910 (aged 72)
- Cause of death: Stroke
- Resting place: Forest Hill Cemetery, Madison, Wisconsin
- Party: Republican
- Spouse: Isabella R. Herd (m. 1870)
- Children: Isabelle; Arthur; Jessie; Charles; Jean
- Occupation: Construction contractor, brick manufacturer

David Stephens (July 20, 1837 – April 3, 1910) was a Scottish American immigrant, contractor, and Republican politician. He was a member of the Wisconsin State Assembly in 1889, representing Madison and southeast Dane County.

== Biography ==
David Stephens was born in Kincardineshire, Scotland, in July 1837. He was raised and educated there, but was sent to England as a young man. He worked in England until 1863, when he traveled to India to work as superintendent for the construction of the railroad between Nagpur and Bombay. He remained on this job until 1867, then returned briefly to Scotland before emigrating to the United States in 1868.

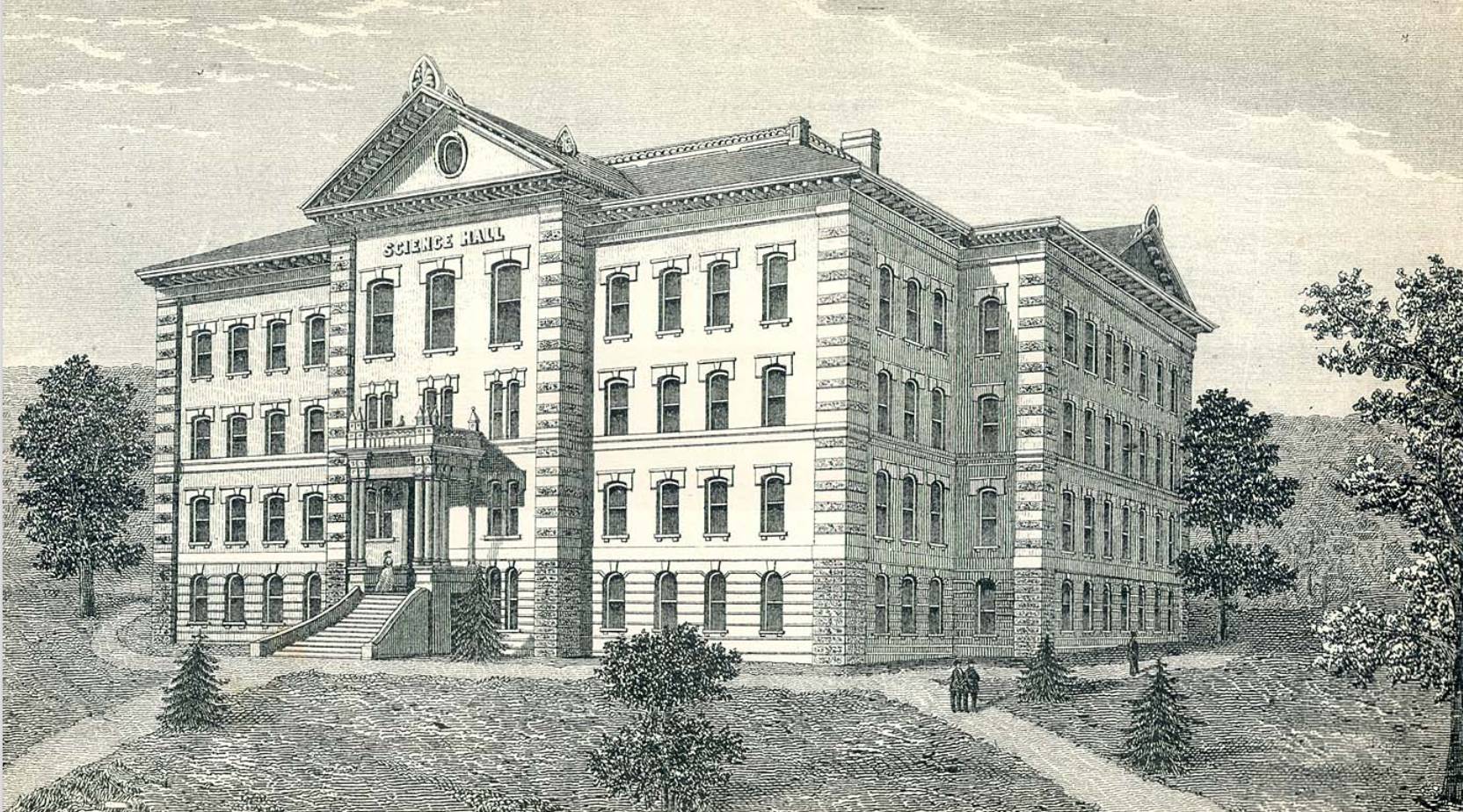
Science Hall as depicted in the 1877 Wisconsin Blue Book.

He emigrated via New York City, but then came directly to the city of Madison, Wisconsin, where he was employed by the U.S. government as superintendent for the construction of the U.S. customs house and post office. He then formed a partnership with W. T. Fish to work as construction contractors, which lasted until 1874. They constructed many significant buildings in the region, including the Dane County Courthouse, the Jefferson County courthouse, the Appleton courthouse, the insane asylum in Elgin, Illinois, the normal school at Whitewater, Wisconsin, and Ladies' Hall and Science Hall at the University of Wisconsin.

While working as a general contractor, he also established the Madison Stone Quarry, which he operated for the rest of his life. He used his quarry to source stone and gravel for many of his projects, and was also invested in a granite quarry in Waterloo, Wisconsin, which shipped stone to Chicago for construction.

He moved his residence to the neighboring town of Madison in 1875. He was elected chairman of the town board in 1887 and 1888. He was then elected to the Wisconsin State Assembly in the fall of 1888, running on the Republican Party ticket. He was not a candidate for re-election in 1890.

He suffered a severe injury working at his stone quarry in 1899. A stone-crusher sent a fragment of stone into his left eye, and the eye had to be removed.

Stephens died on April 3, 1910.

== Personal life and family ==
David Stephens was the eldest of four children born to John Stephens and his wife, Marion (née Scott). He married Isabella R. Herd on June 21, 1870. Isabella was also an immigrant from Kincardineshire, Scotland. They had at least five children together.

== Electoral history ==
=== Wisconsin Assembly (1888) ===
Wisconsin Assembly, Dane 1st District Election, 1888
Party	Candidate	Votes	%	±%
General Election, November 6, 1888
Republican	David Stephens	2,945	48.94%	+4.68%
Democratic	J. M. Clancy	2,665	44.28%	−8.07%
Prohibition	I. W. Kanouse	408	6.78%	+3.38%
Plurality		280	4.65%	-3.44%
Total votes		6,018	100.0%	+124.55%
Republican gain from Democratic				

Wisconsin State Assembly
Preceded by Michael J. Cantwell	Member of the Wisconsin State Assembly from the Dane 1st district January 7, 1889 – January 5, 1891	Succeeded by Harry E. Briggs
