= Vilas, South Dakota =

- Town
- Location in Miner County and the state of South Dakota
- Coordinates: 44°00′15″N 97°35′44″W
- Country: United States
- State: South Dakota
- County: Miner
- Incorporated: 1910

Area
  - Total: 2.98 sq mi (7.71 km^{2})
  - Land: 2.98 sq mi (7.71 km^{2})
  - Water: 0 sq mi (0.00 km^{2})
- Elevation: 1,473 ft (449 m)

Population (2020)
  - Total: 29
  - Density: 9.7/sq mi (3.76/km^{2})
- Time zone: UTC-6 (Central (CST))
  - Summer (DST): UTC-5 (CDT)
- ZIP code: 57349
- Area code: 605
- FIPS code: 46-67340
- GNIS feature ID: 1267616

Vilas is a town in Miner County, South Dakota, United States. The population was 29 at the 2020 census.

== History ==
Vilas was platted in 1883. It was named for William Freeman Vilas, a U.S. Senator from Wisconsin. A post office was established at Vilas in 1884, and remained in operation until it was discontinued in 1968.

== Geography ==
According to the United States Census Bureau, the town has a total area of 2.32 square miles (6.01 km^{2}), all land.

== Demographics ==
Historical population
Census	Pop.	Note	%±
1910	157		—
1920	144		−8.3%
1930	106		−26.4%
1940	91		−14.2%
1950	71		−22.0%
1960	49		−31.0%
1970	33		−32.7%
1980	28		−15.2%
1990	28		0.0%
2000	19		−32.1%
2010	20		5.3%
2020	29		45.0%
U.S. Decennial Census

=== 2010 census ===
As of the census of 2010, there were 20 people, 9 households, and 6 families residing in the town. The population density was 8.6 inhabitants per square mile (3.3/km^{2}). There were 13 housing units at an average density of 5.6 per square mile (2.2/km^{2}). The racial makeup of the town was 100.0% White.

There were 9 households, of which 33.3% had children under the age of 18 living with them, 33.3% were married couples living together, 33.3% had a male householder with no wife present, and 33.3% were non-families. 33.3% of all households were made up of individuals, and 11.1% had someone living alone who was 65 years of age or older. The average household size was 2.22 and the average family size was 2.83.

The median age in the town was 42.5 years. 35% of residents were under the age of 18; 5% were between the ages of 18 and 24; 10% were from 25 to 44; 40% were from 45 to 64; and 10% were 65 years of age or older. The gender makeup of the town was 70.0% male and 30.0% female.

=== 2000 census ===
As of the census of 2000, there were 19 people, 7 households, and 5 families residing in the town. The population density was 8.2 people per square mile (3.2/km^{2}). There were 9 housing units at an average density of 3.9 per square mile (1.5/km^{2}). The racial makeup of the town was 100.00% White.

There were 7 households, out of which 42.9% had children under the age of 18 living with them, 71.4% were married couples living together, 14.3% had a female householder with no husband present, and 14.3% were non-families. 14.3% of all households were made up of individuals, and none had someone living alone who was 65 years of age or older. The average household size was 2.71 and the average family size was 3.00.

In the town, the population was spread out, with 36.8% under the age of 18, 5.3% from 18 to 24, 26.3% from 25 to 44, 21.1% from 45 to 64, and 10.5% who were 65 years of age or older. The median age was 38 years. For every 100 females, there were 90.0 males. For every 100 females age 18 and over, there were 100.0 males.

The median income for a household in the town was $25,625, and the median income for a family was $26,250. Males had a median income of $0 versus $18,750 for females. The per capita income for the town was $7,776. There are 33.3% of families living below the poverty line and 29.4% of the population, including no under eighteens and none of those over 64.
