= 46th Infantry Division (Russian Empire) =

- 46-я пехотная дивизия
- Active: 1914–1918
- Country: Russian Empire
- Branch: Russian Imperial Army
- Role: Infantry

The 46th Infantry Division (Russian: 46-я пехотная дивизия, 46-ya Pekhotnaya Diviziya) was an infantry formation of the Russian Imperial Army.

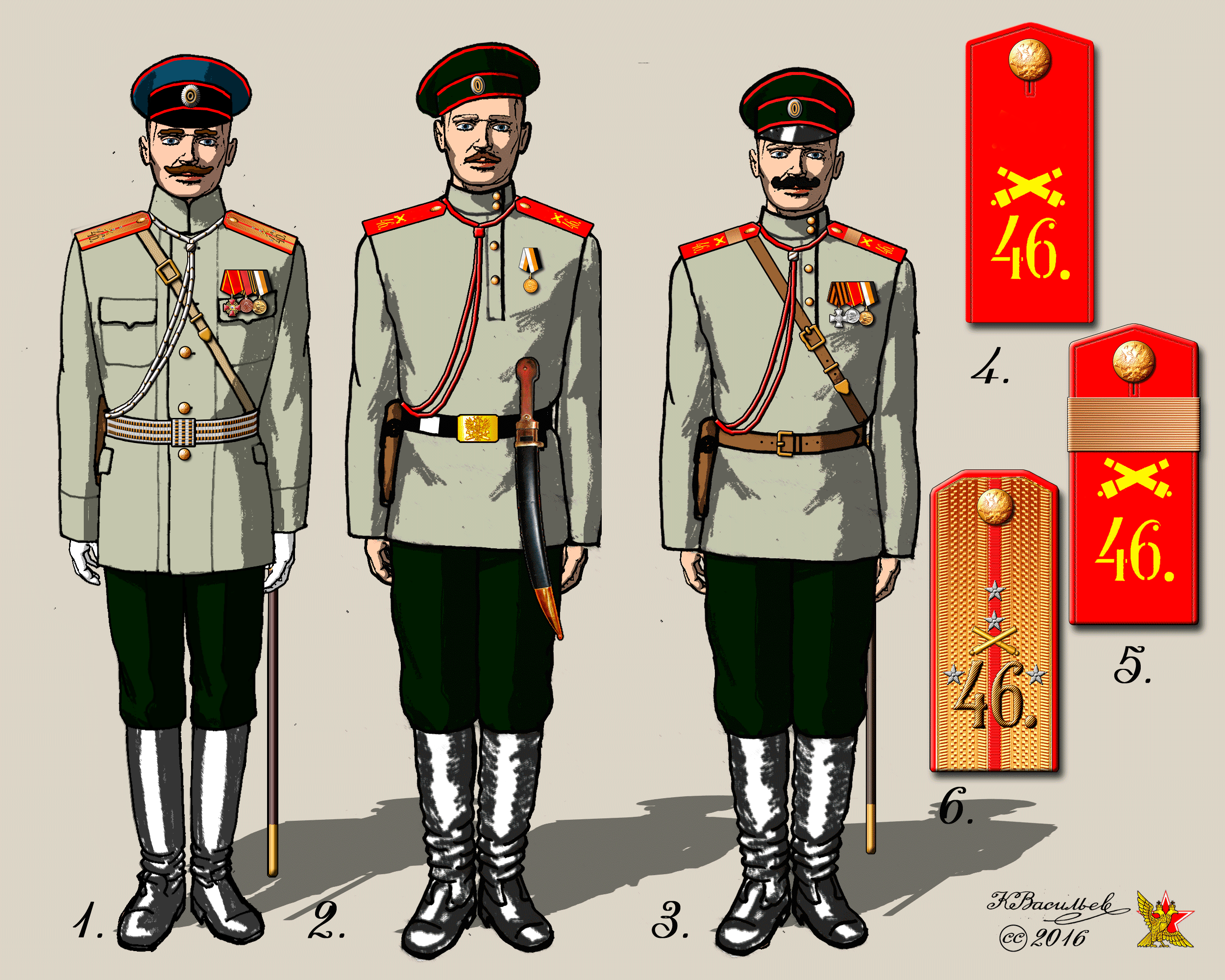
Uniform of the 46th Artillery Brigade

== Organization ==
- 1st Brigade
  - 181st Infantry Regiment
  - 182nd Infantry Regiment
- 2nd Brigade
  - 183rd Infantry Regiment
  - 184th Warsaw Infantry Regiment
- 46th Artillery Brigade

== Commanders ==
- February-August 1915: Anthony Veselovsky

== Commanders of the 2nd Brigade ==
- 1910-1915: Dmitri Parsky
