= 184th Ohio Infantry Regiment =

- Active: February 1, 1865, to September 27, 1865
- Country: United States
- Allegiance: Union
- Branch: Infantry

The 184th Ohio Infantry Regiment, sometimes 184th Ohio Volunteer Infantry (or 184th OVI) was an infantry regiment in the Union Army during the American Civil War.

== Service ==
The 184th Ohio Infantry was organized at Camp Chase in Columbus, Ohio September through October 1864 and mustered in for one year service on February 1, 1865, under the command of Colonel Henry S. Commager.

The regiment left Ohio for Nashville, Tennessee, February 21; then moved to Chattanooga and to Bridgeport, Alabama, March 21. Guarded the railroad bridge over the Tennessee River at Bridgeport, and also the railroad between Bridgeport and Chattanooga, Tennessee, with frequent skirmishes with Rebel cavalry and guerrillas, March 21 through July 25. Served garrison duty at Edgefield, Tennessee, July 25 through September 20, 1865.

The 184th Ohio Infantry mustered out of service September 20, 1865, at Nashville, Tennessee, and was discharged at Camp Chase on September 27, 1865.

== Casualties ==
The regiment lost a total of 60 men during service; 1 enlisted man killed, 1 officer and 58 enlisted men due to disease.

== Commanders ==
- Colonel Henry S. Commager

== See also ==
- List of Ohio Civil War units
- Ohio in the Civil War
