= 184th Warsaw Infantry Regiment =

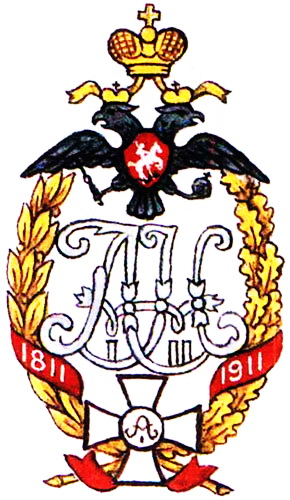
- Active: 1811–1918
- Country: Russian Empire
- Branch: Imperial Russian Army
- Role: Infantry

The 184th Warsaw Infantry Regiment (Russian: 184 пехотный Варшавский полк) was an infantry regiment of the Imperial Russian Army. The regiment was formed on March 27, 1811, in the reign of Alexander I of Russia. The distinctive "Warsaw" received during Congress Poland. The festival was celebrated on March 27. In 1914 the unit was stationed in Shuya, Ivanovo Oblast, located 300 miles northeast of Moscow. In the 46 infantry division (xxv army corps). soldier regiment was, inter alia, Pavel Argeyev, późnieszy as hunting of World War I, and from 1907 - 1909 Konstantin Kalinin known aircraft.

== Bibliography ==
- Caban, Wiesław (2001). Służba rekrutów Królestwa Polskiego w armii carskiej w latach 1831-1873 [Service of Recruits from Congress Poland in the Tsar's Army, 1831–1873] (in Polish). Warsaw: Wydawnictwo DiG. ISBN 83-7181-209-4.
- Spis pułków armii carskiej (pl)
- www.grwar.ru (ru)
- mosgrenadier.narod.ru (ru)
