= Dexter Curtis =

American politician

Dexter Curtis (September 12, 1828 – May 15, 1898) was an American inventor, businessman, and politician.

Born in Schenectady, New York, Curtis grew up on a farm. He was in the lumber business and lived in Louisiana, Michigan, and Chicago, Illinois. In 1866, Curtis moved to the town of Burke, Dane County, Wisconsin and was a farmer. Curtis invented and patented the Curtis zinc horse-collar pad. The factory for the horse-collar pads was located in Madison, Wisconsin. He also operated a dry goods business. Curtis served on the Madison Common Council and was a Democrat. In 1883, Curtis served in the Wisconsin State Senate from Madison, Wisconsin. Curtis died in Madison, Wisconsin from a heart attack ("apoplexy of the heart").
