= Richard Nixon =

President of the United States from 1969 to 1974

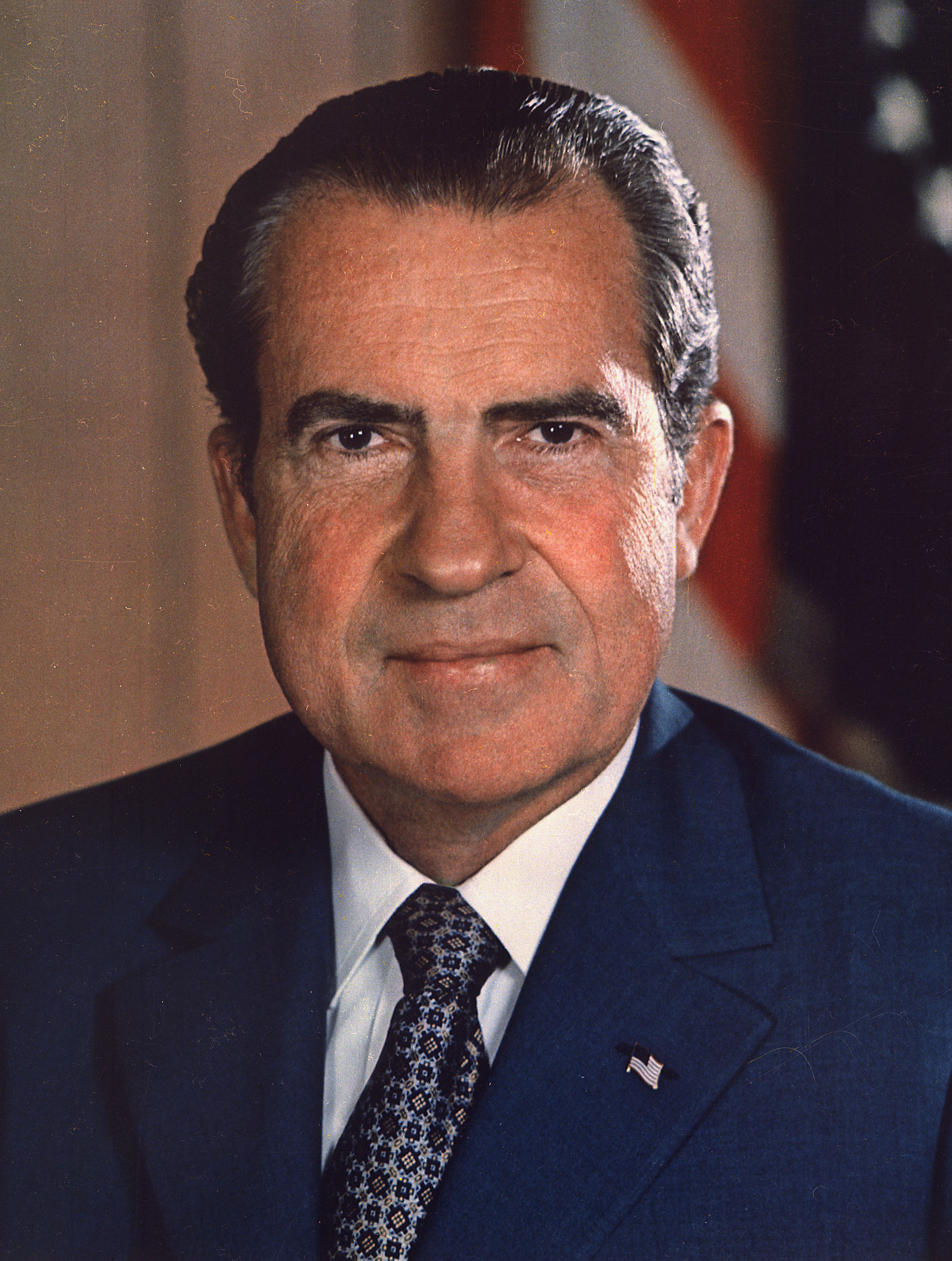
- Official portrait, 1972

37th President of the United States
- In office January 20, 1969 – August 9, 1974
- Vice President: Spiro Agnew (1969–1973); Vacant (Oct–Dec 1973); Gerald Ford (1973–1974)
- Preceded by: Lyndon B. Johnson
- Succeeded by: Gerald Ford

36th Vice President of the United States
- In office January 20, 1953 – January 20, 1961
- President: Dwight D. Eisenhower
- Preceded by: Alben W. Barkley
- Succeeded by: Lyndon B. Johnson

United States Senator from California
- In office December 1, 1950 – January 1, 1953
- Preceded by: Sheridan Downey
- Succeeded by: Thomas Kuchel

Member of the U.S. House of Representatives from California's 12th district
- In office January 3, 1947 – November 30, 1950
- Preceded by: Jerry Voorhis
- Succeeded by: Patrick J. Hillings

Personal details
- Born: January 9, 1913 Yorba Linda, California, U.S.
- Died: April 22, 1994 (aged 81) New York City, U.S.
- Resting place: Richard Nixon Presidential Library and Museum
- Party: Republican
- Spouse: Pat Ryan (m. 1940; died 1993)
- Children: Tricia; Julie
- Parents: Francis A. Nixon; Hannah Milhous
- Education: Whittier College (BA); Duke University (LLB)
- Occupation: Author; lawyer; politician; military veteran

Military service
- Branch/service: United States Navy; Naval Reserve
- Years of service: 1942–1946 (active); 1946–1966 (inactive)
- Rank: Commander
- Battles/wars: World War II; Pacific War
- Awards: Navy and Marine Corps Commendation Medal; American Campaign Medal; Asiatic–Pacific Campaign Medal; World War II Victory Medal; Armed Forces Reserve Medal
- Richard Nixon's voice Nixon speaking on peace in Vietnam; Recorded November 3, 1969

Richard Milhous Nixon (January 9, 1913 – April 22, 1994) was the 37th president of the United States, serving from 1969 until his resignation in 1974. A member of the Republican Party, he represented California in both houses of the United States Congress before serving as the 36th vice president under President Dwight D. Eisenhower from 1953 to 1961. His presidency saw the reduction of U.S. involvement in the Vietnam War, détente with the Soviet Union and China, the Apollo 11 Moon landing, and the establishment of the Environmental Protection Agency and Occupational Safety and Health Administration. Nixon's second term ended early when he became the only U.S. president to resign from office, as a part of the Watergate scandal.

Nixon was born into a poor family of Quakers in Yorba Linda, Southern California. He graduated from Whittier College with a Bachelor of Arts in 1934 and from Duke University School of Law with a Bachelor of Laws degree in 1937, practiced law in California, and then moved with his wife Pat to Washington, D.C. in 1942, to work for the federal government. After serving in the Naval Reserve during World War II, he was elected to the House of Representatives in 1946. His work on the Alger Hiss case established his reputation as a leading anti-communist. In 1950, he was elected to the Senate. Nixon was the running mate of Eisenhower, the Republican Party's presidential nominee in the 1952 and 1956 elections. Nixon served for eight years as vice president, and his two terms saw an increase in the notability of the office. He narrowly lost the 1960 presidential election to John F. Kennedy. After his loss in the 1962 race for governor of California, Nixon announced his retirement from politics. However, he ran again for the presidency in 1968 and defeated the Democratic candidate, Vice President Hubert Humphrey.

Seeking to bring the North Vietnamese to the negotiating table, Nixon ordered military operations and carpet bombing campaigns in Cambodia. He covertly aided Pakistan during the Bangladesh Liberation War in 1971 and ended American combat involvement in Vietnam in 1973, and the military draft the same year. His visit to China in 1972 led to diplomatic relations between the two nations, and he finalized the Anti-Ballistic Missile Treaty with the Soviet Union. During the course of his first term, he enacted many progressive environmental policy shifts, such as creating the Environmental Protection Agency and passing laws, including the Endangered Species and Clean Air Acts. In addition to implementing the Twenty-sixth Amendment that lowered the voting age from 21 to 18, he ended the direct international convertibility of the U.S. dollar to gold in 1971, effectively taking the United States off the gold standard. He also imposed wage and price controls for 90 days, launched the war on cancer and the war on drugs, passed the Controlled Substances Act, and presided over the end of the Space Race by overseeing the Apollo 11 Moon landing. He was re-elected in 1972, when he defeated George McGovern in one of the largest landslide victories in American history.

In his second term, Nixon ordered an airlift to resupply Israeli materiel losses in the Yom Kippur War, a conflict which led to the oil crisis at home. From 1973, ongoing revelations from the Nixon administration's involvement in Watergate eroded his support in Congress and the country. The scandal began with a break-in at the Democratic National Committee office, ordered by administration officials, and escalated despite cover-up efforts by the Nixon administration, of which he was aware. On August 9, 1974, facing almost certain impeachment and removal from office, Nixon resigned. On September 8, 1974, he received a controversial pardon from his successor, Gerald Ford. During nearly 20 years of retirement, Nixon wrote nine books and undertook many foreign trips, rehabilitating his image into that of an elder statesman and leading expert on foreign affairs. On April 18, 1994, he suffered a debilitating stroke and died four days later.

== Early life and education ==
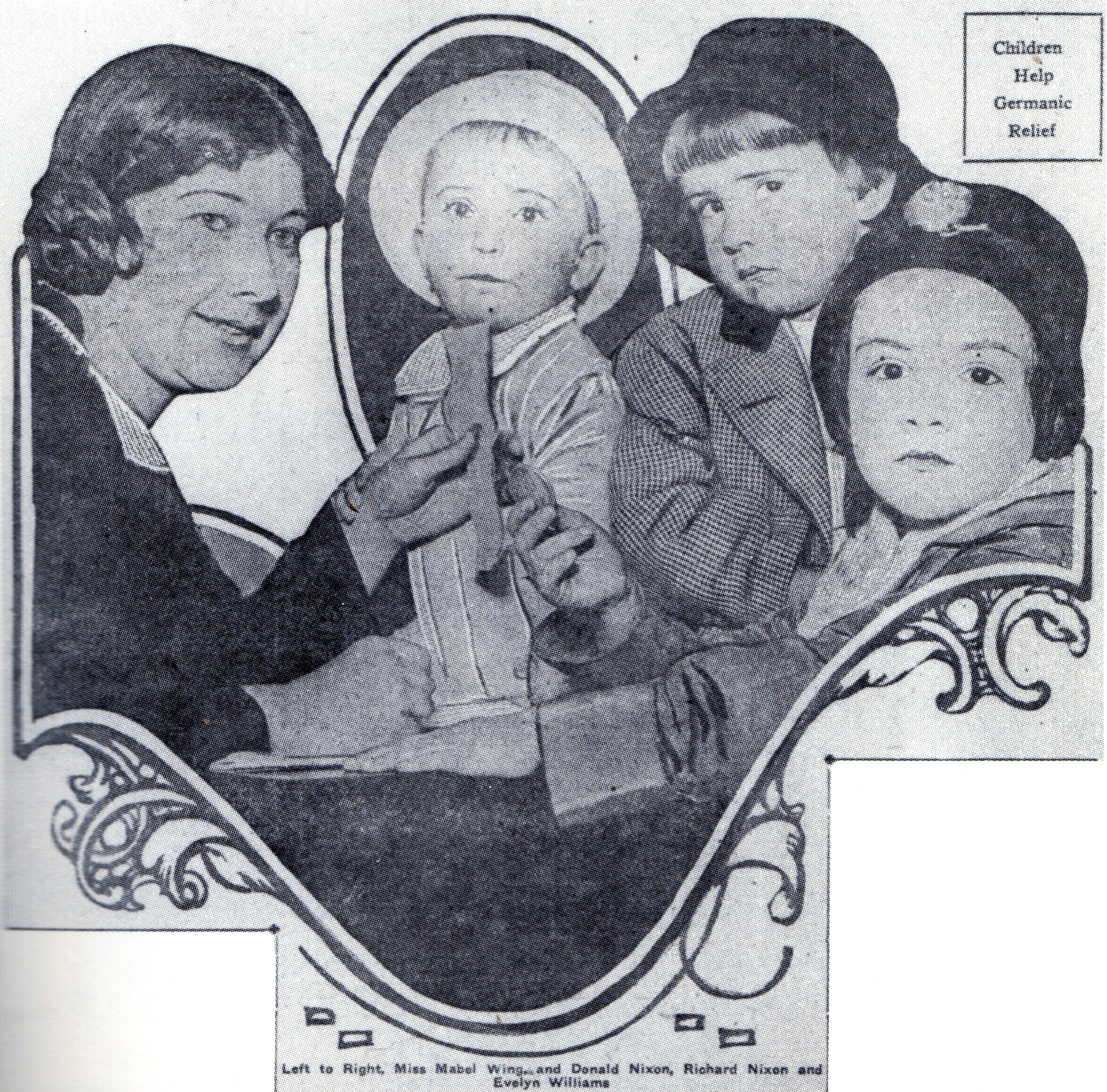
Nixon (second from right) makes his newspaper debut in 1916, contributing five cents to a fund for World War I orphans; his brother Donald is to his right.

Richard Milhous Nixon was born on January 9, 1913, in what was then the township precinct of Yorba Linda, California, in a house built by his father, on his family's lemon ranch. His parents were Francis A. Nixon and Hannah (Milhous) Nixon. His mother was a Quaker, and his father converted from Methodism to the Quaker faith. Through his mother, Nixon was a descendant of the early English settler Thomas Cornell.

Nixon's upbringing was influenced by Quaker observances of the time, such as abstinence from alcohol, dancing, and swearing. He had four brothers: Harold, Donald, Arthur, and Edward. Four of the five Nixon boys were named after British kings; Richard was named after Richard the Lionheart.

Nixon's early life was marked by hardship, and he later quoted Dwight Eisenhower in describing his boyhood: "We were poor, but the glory of it was we didn't know it". The Nixon family ranch failed in 1922, and the family moved to Whittier, California. In an area of East Whittier with many Quakers, Frank Nixon opened a grocery store and gas station at what is now the corner of Whittier Boulevard and Santa Gertrudes Avenue. During this period, the Nixon family attended East Whittier Friends Church. Richard's younger brother Arthur died in 1925 at the age of seven after a short illness. Richard was 12 years old when a spot was found on his lung; with a family history of tuberculosis, he was forbidden to play sports. The spot turned out to be scar tissue from pneumonia.

=== Primary and secondary education ===
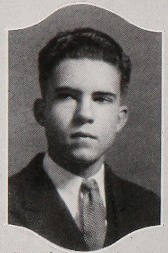
Nixon as a senior at Whittier High School, 1930

Nixon attended East Whittier Elementary School, where he was president of his eighth-grade class. His older brother Harold had attended Whittier High School, which his parents thought resulted in a dissolute lifestyle. They decided to send Nixon to the larger Fullerton Union High School. Though he had to ride a school bus an hour each way during his freshman year, he attained excellent grades. Later, he lived with an aunt in Fullerton during the week. He played junior varsity football and seldom missed practice, though he rarely was used in games. He had greater success as a debater, winning several championships and taking his only formal tutelage in public speaking from Fullerton's Head of English, H. Lynn Sheller. Nixon later mused on Sheller's words, "Remember, speaking is conversation...don't shout at people. Talk to them. Converse with them." Nixon said he tried to use a conversational tone as much as possible.

At the start of his junior year in September 1928, Nixon's parents permitted him to transfer to Whittier High School. At Whittier, Nixon lost a bid for student body president—his first electoral defeat. He often rose at 4 a.m. to drive the family truck to Los Angeles to purchase vegetables and then drove to the store to wash and display them before going to school. Harold was diagnosed with tuberculosis the previous year; when their mother took him to Arizona, hoping to improve his health, the demands on Nixon increased, causing him to give up football. Nevertheless, Nixon graduated from Whittier High third in his class of 207.

=== College and law school ===
Nixon was offered a tuition grant to attend Harvard University, but with Harold's continued illness requiring his mother's care until he died in 1933, Richard was needed at the store. He remained in his hometown and enrolled at Whittier College in September 1930. His expenses were met by his maternal grandfather. Nixon played for the basketball team; he also tried out for football, and though he lacked the size to play, he remained on the team as a substitute and was noted for his enthusiasm. Instead of fraternities and sororities, Whittier had literary societies. Nixon was snubbed by the only one for men, the Franklins, many of whom were from prominent families, unlike Nixon. He responded by helping to found a new society, the Orthogonian Society. In addition to the society, his studies, and work at the store, Nixon engaged in several extracurricular activities; he was a champion debater and hard worker. In 1933, he was engaged to Ola Florence Welch, daughter of the Whittier police chief, but they broke up in 1935.

After graduating summa cum laude with a Bachelor of Arts in history from Whittier in 1934, Nixon was accepted at the new Duke University School of Law, which offered scholarships to top students, including Nixon. It paid high salaries to its professors, many of whom had national or international reputations. The number of scholarships was greatly reduced for second- and third-year students, creating intense competition. Nixon kept his scholarship, was elected president of the Duke Bar Association, inducted into the Order of the Coif, and graduated third in his class with a Bachelor of Laws degree in June 1937.

== Early career and marriage ==
Nixon's family: Julie and David Eisenhower, President Nixon, First Lady Pat Nixon, Tricia, and Edward Cox on December 24, 1971

After graduating from Duke, Nixon initially hoped to join the FBI. He received no response to his application and learned years later that he had been hired, but his appointment had been canceled at the last minute due to budget cuts. He was admitted to the California bar in 1937, and began practicing in Whittier with the law firm Wingert and Bewley in the National Bank of Whittier Building. His work concentrated on commercial litigation for local petroleum companies and other corporate matters, as well as on wills. Nixon was reluctant to work on divorce cases, disliking frank sexual talk from women. In 1938, he opened up his own branch of Wingert and Bewley in La Habra, California, and became a full partner in the firm the following year. In later years, Nixon proudly said he was the only modern president to have previously worked as a practicing attorney. During this period, Nixon was also the president of the Citra-Frost Company, which attempted to produce and sell frozen orange juice, but the company went bankrupt after 18 months.

In January 1938, Nixon was cast in the Whittier Community Players production of The Dark Tower in which he played opposite his future wife, a high school teacher named Thelma "Pat" Ryan. In his memoirs, Nixon described it as "a case of love at first sight", but apparently for Nixon only, since Pat Ryan turned him down several times before agreeing to date him. Once they began their courtship, Ryan was reluctant to marry Nixon; they dated for two years before she assented to his proposal. They wed in a small ceremony on June 21, 1940. After a honeymoon in Mexico, the Nixons began their married life in Whittier. They had two daughters: Tricia, born in 1946, and Julie, born in 1948.

== Military service ==
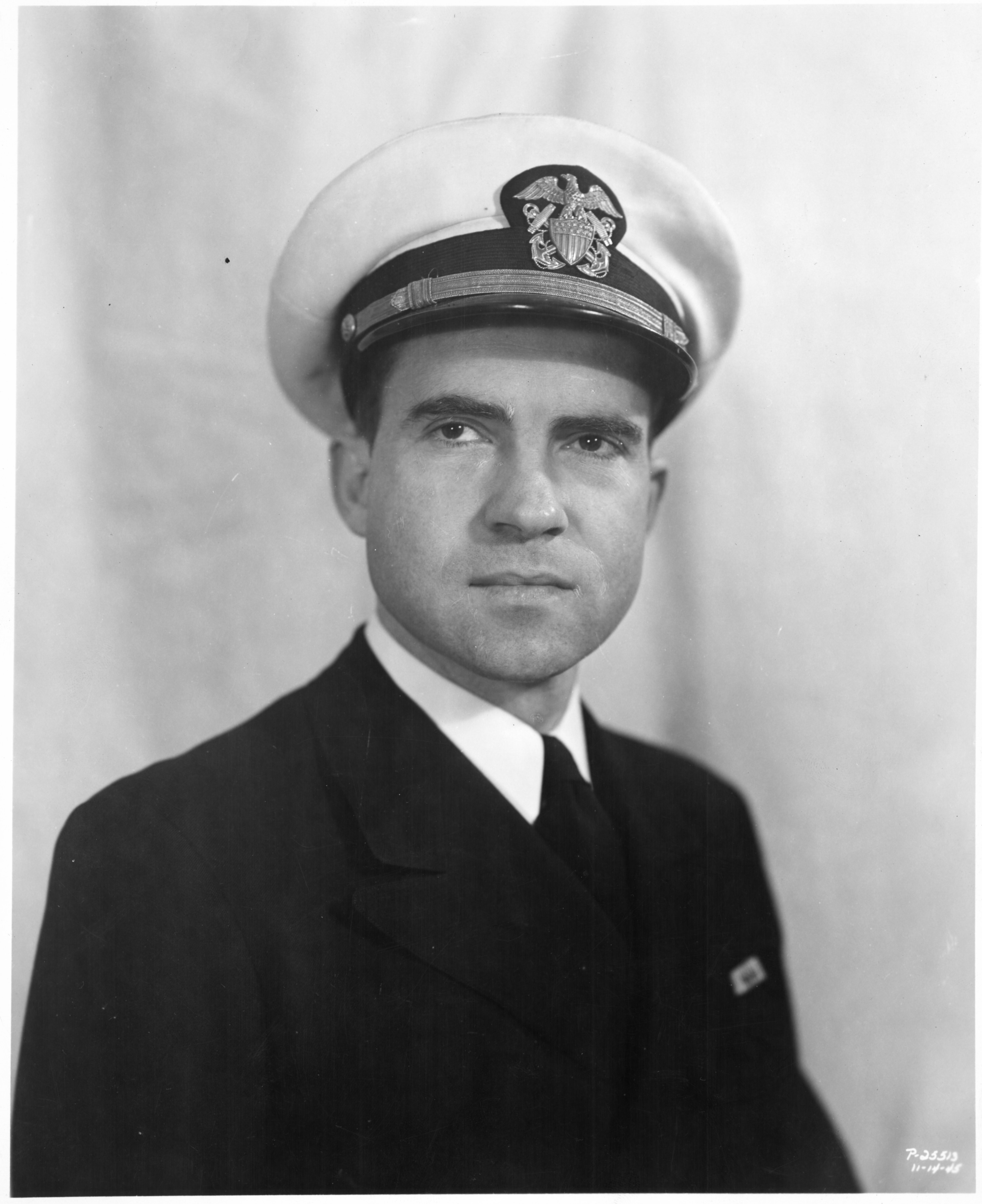
Nixon as a lieutenant commander in the United States Navy, c. 1945

In January 1942, the couple moved to the Northern Virginia suburbs, where Nixon took a job at the Office of Price Administration in Washington, D.C. In his political campaigns, Nixon suggested that this was his response to Pearl Harbor, but he had sought the position throughout the latter part of 1941. Both Nixon and his wife believed he was limiting his prospects by remaining in Whittier. He was assigned to the tire rationing division, where he was tasked with replying to correspondence. He did not enjoy the role, and four months later applied to join the United States Navy. Though he could have claimed an exemption from the draft as a birthright Quaker, or a deferral due to his government service, Nixon nevertheless sought a commission in the Navy. His application was approved, and he was appointed a lieutenant junior grade in the United States Naval Reserve on June 15, 1942.

In October 1942, he was given his first assignment as aide to the commander of the Naval Air Station Ottumwa in Wapello County, Iowa, until May 1943. Seeking more excitement, he requested sea duty; on July 2, 1943, he was assigned to Marine Aircraft Group 25 and the South Pacific Combat Air Transport Command (SCAT), where he supported the logistics of operations in the South Pacific theater during World War II.

On October 1, 1943, Nixon was promoted to lieutenant. Nixon commanded the SCAT forward detachments at Vella Lavella, Bougainville, and finally at Nissan Island. His unit prepared manifests and flight plans for R4D/C-47 operations and supervised the loading and unloading of the transport aircraft. For this service, he received a Navy Letter of Commendation and a Navy Commendation Ribbon, which was later updated to the Navy and Marine Corps Commendation Medal, from his commanding officer for "meritorious and efficient performance of duty as Officer in Charge of the South Pacific Combat Air Transport Command". Upon his return to the U.S., Nixon was appointed the administrative officer of the Alameda Naval Air Station in Alameda, California. In January 1945, he was transferred to the Bureau of Aeronautics office in Philadelphia, where he helped negotiate the termination of World War II contracts, and received his second letter of commendation, from the Secretary of the Navy for "meritorious service, tireless effort, and devotion to duty". Later, Nixon was transferred to other offices to work on contracts, and he moved to Philadelphia, New York, and finally to Baltimore. On October 3, 1945, he was promoted to lieutenant commander. On March 10, 1946, he was relieved of active duty. On June 1, 1953, he was promoted to commander in the U.S. Naval Reserve, and he retired from the U.S. Naval Reserve on June 6, 1966.

While in the Navy, Nixon became a very good five-card stud poker player, helping finance his first congressional campaign with the winnings. In a 1983 interview, he described turning down an invitation to dine with Charles Lindbergh because he was hosting a game.

== Political beginnings ==
=== U.S. House of Representatives (1947–1950) ===
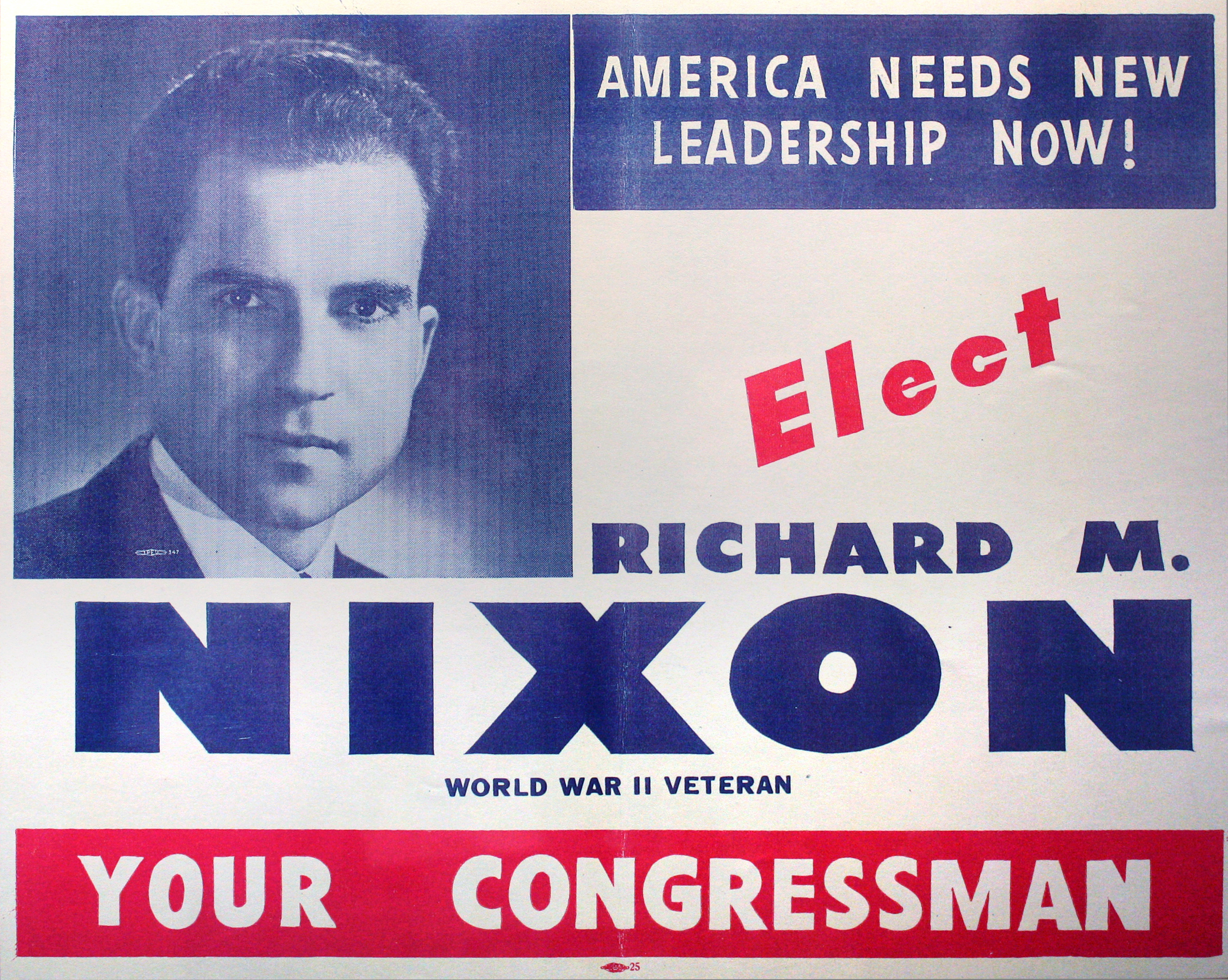
Nixon's 1946 congressional campaign flyer

Republicans in California's 12th congressional district were frustrated by their inability to defeat Democratic representative Jerry Voorhis, and they sought a consensus candidate who would run a strong campaign against him. In 1945, they formed a "Committee of 100" to decide on a candidate, hoping to avoid internal dissensions which had led to previous Voorhis victories. After the committee failed to attract higher-profile candidates, Herman Perry, manager of Whittier's Bank of America branch, suggested Nixon, a family friend with whom he had served on Whittier College's board of trustees before the war. Perry wrote to Nixon in Baltimore, and after a night of excited conversation with his wife, Nixon gave Perry an enthusiastic response, confirming that he was registered to vote in California at his parents' Whittier residence. Nixon flew to California and was selected by the committee. When he left the Navy at the start of 1946, Nixon and his wife returned to Whittier, where he began a year of intensive campaigning. He contended that Voorhis had been ineffective as a representative and suggested that Voorhis's endorsement by a group linked to Communists meant that Voorhis must have radical views. Nixon won the election, receiving 65,586 votes to Voorhis's 49,994.

In June 1947, Nixon supported the Taft–Hartley Act, a federal law that monitors the activities and power of labor unions, and he served on the Education and Labor Committee. In August 1947, he became one of 19 House members to serve on the Herter Committee, which went to Europe to report on the need for U.S. foreign aid. Nixon was the youngest member of the committee and the only Westerner. Advocacy by Herter Committee members, including Nixon, led to congressional passage of the Marshall Plan.

In his memoirs, Nixon wrote that he joined the House Un-American Activities Committee (HUAC) "at the end of 1947". However, he was already a HUAC member in early February 1947, when he heard "Enemy Number One" Gerhard Eisler and his sister Ruth Fischer testify. On February 18, 1947, Nixon referred to Eisler's belligerence toward HUAC in his maiden speech to the House. Also by early February 1947, fellow U.S. Representative Charles J. Kersten had introduced him to Father John Francis Cronin in Baltimore. Cronin shared with Nixon his 1945 privately circulated paper "The Problem of American Communism in 1945", with much information from the FBI's William C. Sullivan who by 1961 headed domestic intelligence under J. Edgar Hoover. By May 1948, Nixon had co-sponsored the Mundt–Nixon Bill to implement "a new approach to the complicated problem of internal communist subversion ... It provided for registration of all Communist Party members and required a statement of the source of all printed and broadcast material issued by organizations that were found to be Communist fronts." He served as floor manager for the Republican Party. On May 19, 1948, the bill passed the House by 319 to 58, but later it failed to pass the Senate. The Nixon Library cites this bill's passage as Nixon's first significant victory in Congress.

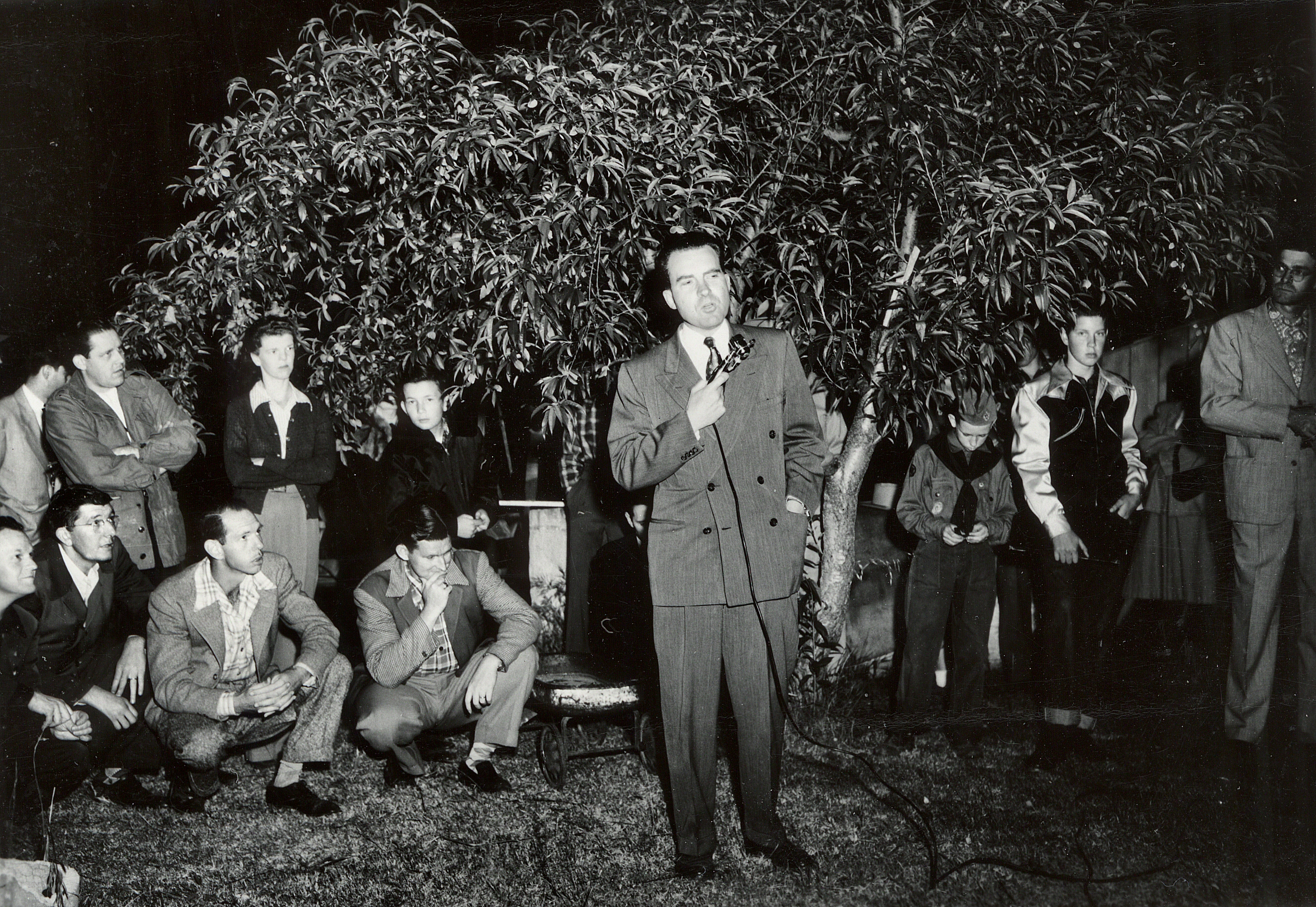
Nixon in Yorba Linda, California, c. April 1950

Nixon first gained national attention in August 1948, when his persistence as a House Un-American Activities Committee member helped break the Alger Hiss spy case. While many doubted Whittaker Chambers's allegations that Hiss, a former State Department official, had been a Soviet spy, Nixon believed them to be true and pressed for the committee to continue its investigation. After Hiss filed suit, alleging defamation, Chambers produced documents corroborating his allegations, including paper and microfilm copies that Chambers turned over to House investigators after hiding them overnight in a field; they became known as the "Pumpkin Papers". Hiss was convicted of perjury in 1950 for denying under oath he had passed documents to Chambers. In 1948, Nixon successfully cross-filed as a candidate in his district, winning both major party primaries, and was comfortably reelected.

=== U.S. Senate (1950–1953) ===
Nixon's 1950 Senate campaign flyer

In 1949, Nixon began to consider running for the United States Senate against the conservative Democratic incumbent, Sheridan Downey, and entered the race in November. Downey, faced with a bitter primary battle with Representative Helen Gahagan Douglas, announced his retirement in March 1950. Nixon and Douglas won the primary elections and engaged in a contentious campaign in which the ongoing Korean War was a major issue. Nixon tried to focus attention on Douglas's liberal voting record. As part of that effort, a "Pink Sheet" was distributed by the Nixon campaign suggesting that Douglas's voting record was similar to that of New York Congressman Vito Marcantonio, reputed to be a communist, and their political views must be nearly identical. Nixon won the election by almost twenty percentage points. During the campaign, Nixon was first called "Tricky Dick" by his opponents for his campaign tactics. After Nixon won, Downey resigned effective November 30, 1950; this enabled the governor to appoint Nixon on December 1, giving him a seniority advantage over other senators elected in 1950, whose terms started in January 1951.

In the Senate, Nixon took a prominent position in opposing global communism, traveling frequently and speaking out against it. He maintained friendly relations with Joseph McCarthy, a controversial U.S. Senate colleague from Wisconsin and fellow anti-communist, but was careful to keep some distance between himself and McCarthy's allegations. Nixon criticized President Harry S. Truman's handling of the Korean War. He supported statehood for Alaska and Hawaii, voted in favor of civil rights for minorities, and supported federal disaster relief for India and Yugoslavia. He voted against price controls and other monetary restrictions, benefits for illegal immigrants, and public power.

== Vice presidency (1953–1961) ==
=== Nomination ===
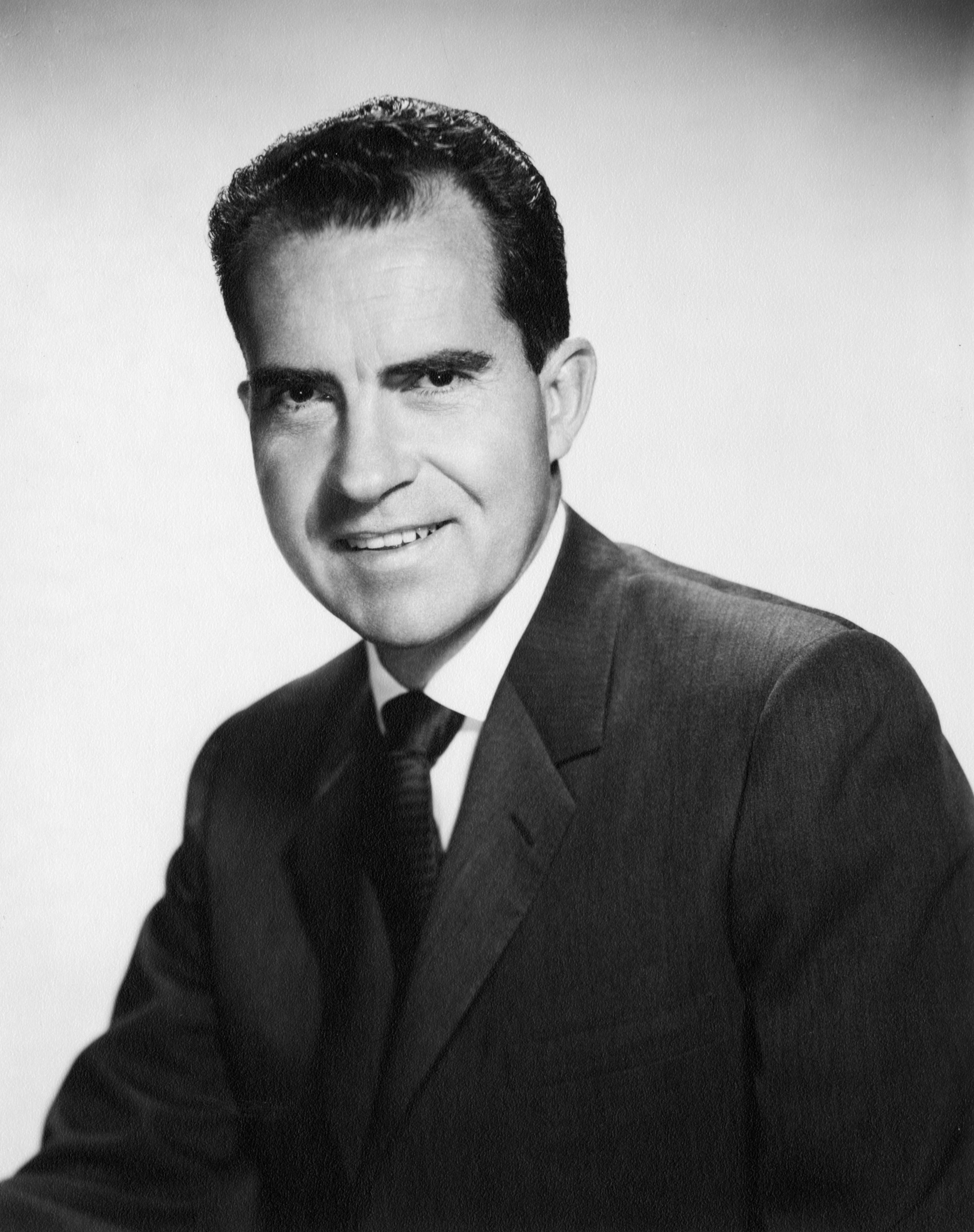
Nixon's official portrait as vice president, c. 1953–1961

Nixon's speech at a state Republican Party fundraiser in New York City on May 8, 1952, impressed Governor Thomas E. Dewey, who was an Eisenhower supporter and had organized a pro-Eisenhower delegation from New York to attend the national convention. In a private meeting following the speech, Dewey suggested to Nixon that he would make a suitable vice presidential candidate to run alongside Eisenhower. Eisenhower later indicated to Paul H. Davis of the Hoover Institution at Stanford University, an intermediary between candidates Eisenhower and Earl Warren, that if he won the nomination, Nixon would be his first choice for the vice presidency, because Eisenhower believed the party needed to promote leaders who were aggressive, capable, and young. Eisenhower later developed a list of seven potential candidates, with Nixon's name at the top.

After Eisenhower was nominated, his key supporters met to discuss vice presidential possibilities. Eisenhower informed the group's chairman, Herbert Brownell Jr. that he did not wish to appear to dictate to the convention by formally sponsoring a single candidate, so the group reviewed several, including Robert A. Taft, Everett Dirksen, and Alfred E. Driscoll, all of whom they quickly rejected. Dewey then raised Nixon's name; the group quickly concurred. Brownell checked with Eisenhower, who indicated his approval. Brownell then called Nixon to inform him that he was Eisenhower's choice. Nixon accepted, then departed for Eisenhower's hotel room to discuss the details of the campaign and Eisenhower's plans for his vice president if the ticket was successful in the general election.

The delegates soon assembled to formalize the selection. Nixon asked Senator William Knowland to nominate him, and Knowland agreed. After Senator John W. Bricker, who had supported Taft for president, declined Nixon's request to second the nomination, Driscoll agreed to do so. There were no other candidates, and Nixon was nominated by acclamation.

On the campaign trail, Eisenhower spoke of his plans for the country, and left the negative campaigning to his running mate. In mid-September, the Republican ticket faced a major crisis when the media reported that Nixon had a political fund, maintained by his backers, which reimbursed him for political expenses. Such a fund was not illegal, but it exposed Nixon to allegations of a potential conflict of interest. With pressure building for Eisenhower to demand Nixon's resignation from the ticket, Nixon went on television to address the nation on September 23, 1952. The address, later named the Checkers speech, was heard by about 60 million Americans, which represented the largest audience ever for a television broadcast at that point. In the speech, Nixon emotionally defended himself, stating that the fund was not secret and that his donors had not received special favors. He painted himself as a patriot and man of modest means, mentioning that his wife had no mink coat; instead, he said, she wore a "respectable Republican cloth coat". The speech was remembered for the gift which Nixon had received, but which he would not give back, which he described as "a little cocker spaniel dog ...sent all the way from Texas. And our little girl—Tricia, the 6-year-old—named it Checkers." The speech prompted a huge public outpouring of support for Nixon. Eisenhower decided to retain him on the ticket, and the ticket was victorious in the November election.

=== Tenure ===
Eisenhower granted Nixon more responsibilities during his term than any previous vice president. Nixon attended Cabinet and National Security Council meetings and chaired them in Eisenhower's absence. A 1953 tour of the Far East succeeded in increasing local goodwill toward the United States and gave Nixon an appreciation of the region as a potential industrial center. He visited Saigon and Hanoi in French Indochina. On his return to the United States at the end of 1953, Nixon increased the time he devoted to foreign relations.

Biographer Irwin Gellman, who chronicled Nixon's congressional years, said of his vice presidency:

Eisenhower radically altered the role of his running mate by presenting him with critical assignments in both foreign and domestic affairs once he assumed his office. The vice president welcomed the president's initiatives and worked energetically to accomplish White House objectives. Because of the collaboration between these two leaders, Nixon deserves the title, "the first modern vice president".

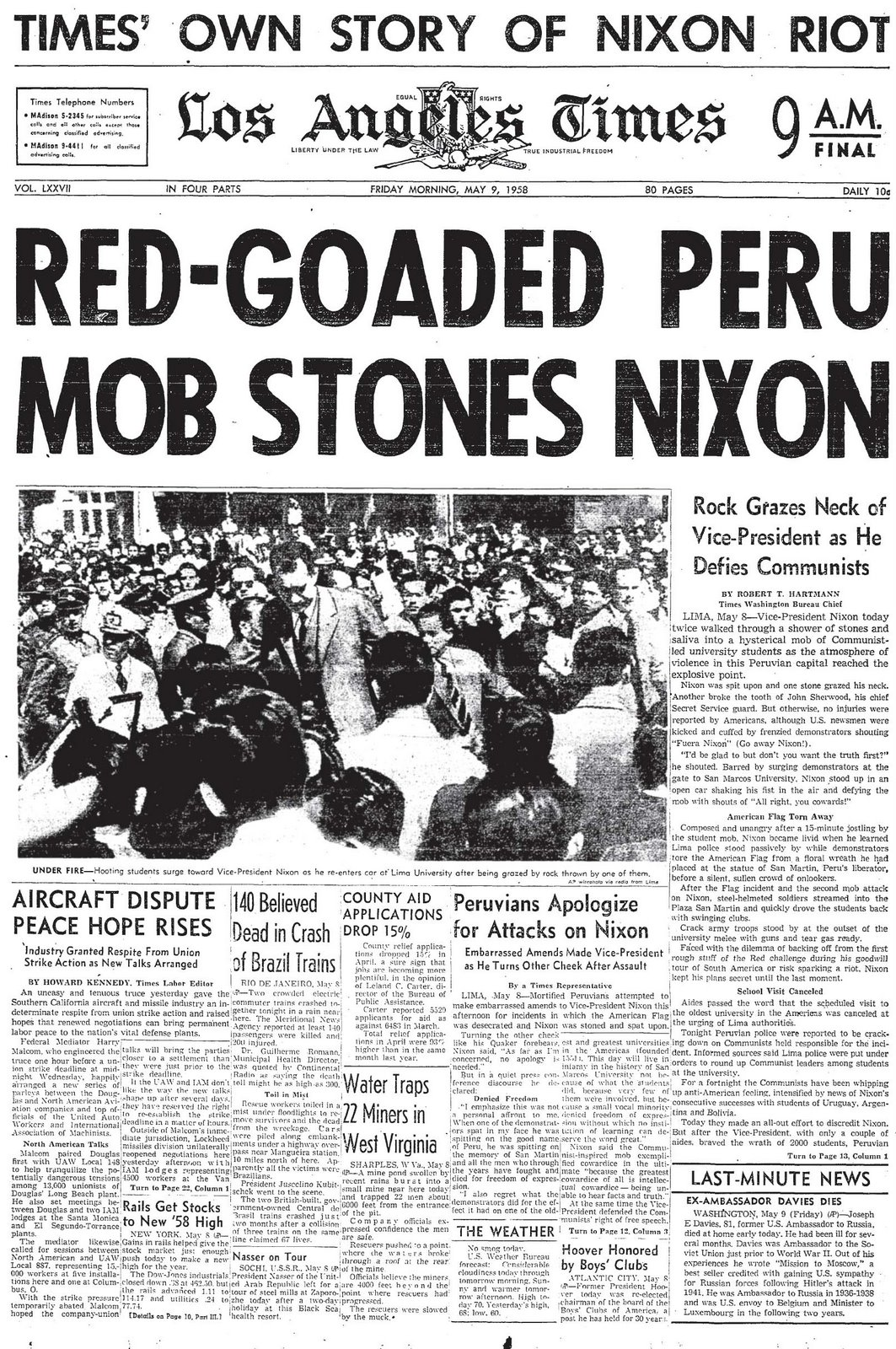
Los Angeles Times

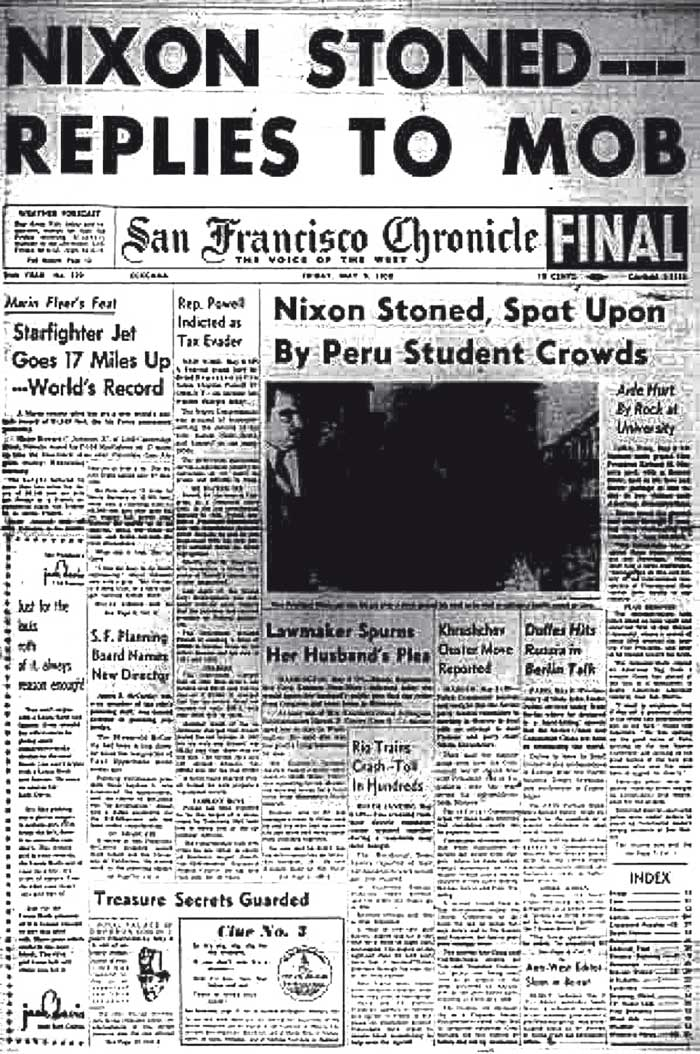
San Francisco Chronicle

American newspaper covers on May 9, 1958, covering student protests against Nixon at the National University of San Marcos in Lima, Peru

Despite intense campaigning by Nixon, who reprised his strong attacks on the Democrats, the Republicans lost control of both houses of Congress in the 1954 elections. These losses caused Nixon to contemplate leaving politics once he had served out his term. On September 24, 1955, President Eisenhower suffered a heart attack, and his condition was initially believed to be life-threatening. Eisenhower was unable to perform his duties for six weeks. The Twenty-fifth Amendment to the United States Constitution had not yet been proposed, and the vice president had no formal power to act. Nonetheless, Nixon acted in Eisenhower's stead during this period, presiding over Cabinet meetings and ensuring that aides and Cabinet officers did not seek power. According to Nixon biographer Stephen Ambrose, Nixon had "earned the high praise he received for his conduct during the crisis ... he made no attempt to seize power".

His spirits buoyed, Nixon sought a second term, but some of Eisenhower's aides aimed to displace him. In a December 1955 meeting, Eisenhower proposed that Nixon not run for reelection and instead become a Cabinet officer in a second Eisenhower administration, to give him administrative experience before a 1960 presidential run. Nixon believed this would destroy his political career. When Eisenhower announced his reelection bid in February 1956, he hedged on the choice of his running mate, saying it was improper to address that question until he had been renominated. Although no Republican was opposing Eisenhower, Nixon received a substantial number of write-in votes against the president in the 1956 New Hampshire primary election. In late April, the President announced that Nixon would again be his running mate. Eisenhower and Nixon were reelected by a comfortable margin in the November 1956 election.

In early 1957, Nixon undertook another foreign trip, this time to Africa. On his return, he helped shepherd the Civil Rights Act of 1957 through Congress. The bill was weakened in the Senate, and civil rights leaders were divided over whether Eisenhower should sign it. Nixon advised the President to sign the bill, which he did. Eisenhower suffered a mild stroke in November 1957, and Nixon gave a press conference, assuring the nation that the Cabinet was functioning well as a team during Eisenhower's brief illness.

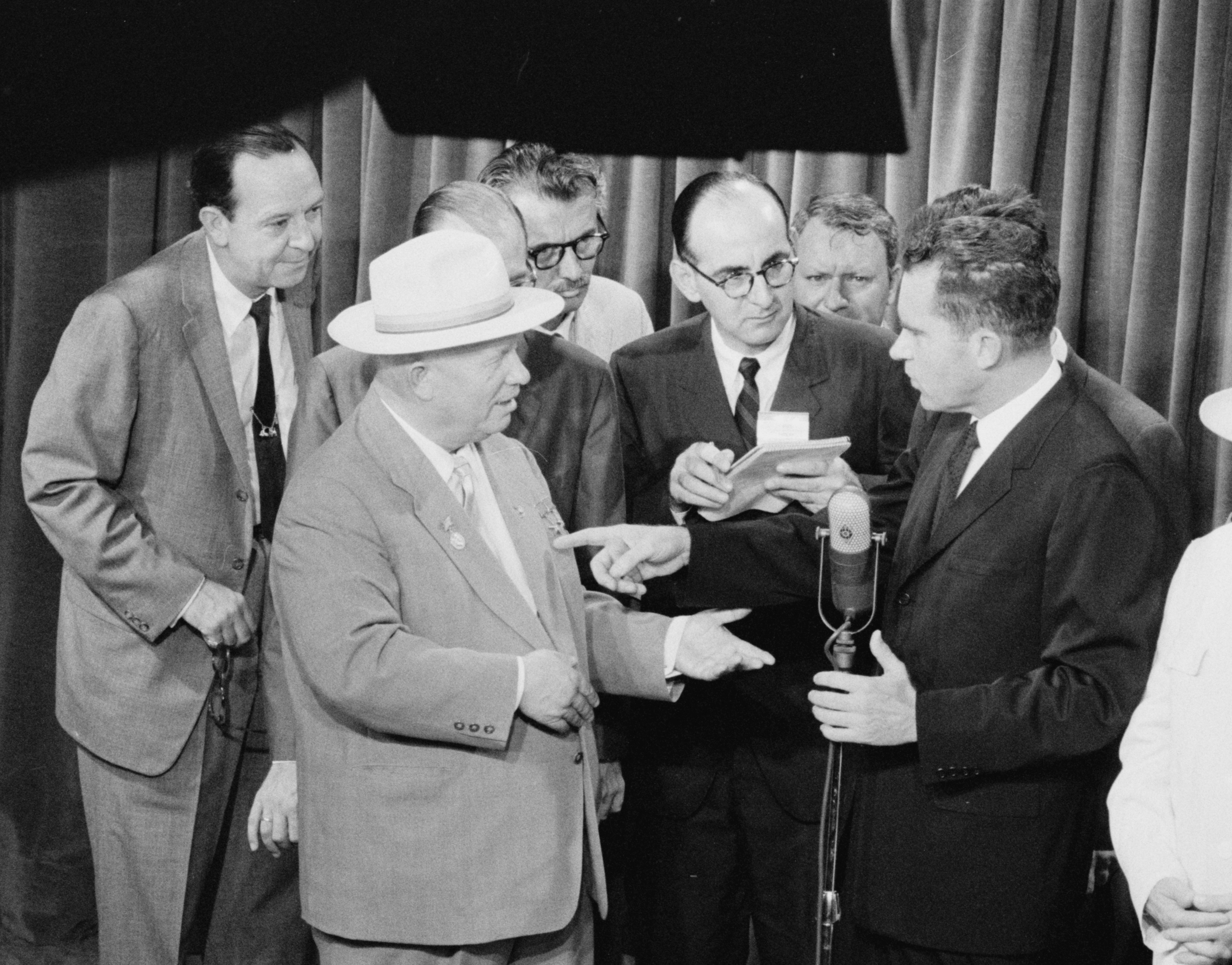
Nikita Khrushchev and Nixon speak as the press looks on at the Kitchen Debate on July 24, 1959; What's My Line? host John Charles Daly is on the far left.

On April 27, 1958, Richard and Pat Nixon reluctantly embarked on a goodwill tour of South America. In Montevideo, Uruguay, Nixon made an impromptu visit to a college campus, where he fielded questions from students on U.S. foreign policy. The trip was uneventful until the Nixon party reached Lima, Peru, where he was met with student demonstrations. Nixon went to the historical campus of National University of San Marcos, the oldest university in the Americas, got out of his car to confront the students, and stayed until forced back into the car by a volley of thrown objects. At his hotel, Nixon faced another mob, and one demonstrator spat on him. In Caracas, Venezuela, Nixon and his wife were spat on by anti-American demonstrators and their limousine was attacked by a pipe-wielding mob. According to Ambrose, Nixon's courageous conduct "caused even some of his bitterest enemies to give him some grudging respect". Reporting to the cabinet after the trip, Nixon claimed there was "absolute proof that [the protestors] were directed and controlled by a central Communist conspiracy." Secretary of State John Foster Dulles and his brother, Director of Central Intelligence Allen Dulles, both concurred with Nixon.

In July 1959, Eisenhower sent Nixon to the Soviet Union for the opening of the American National Exhibition in Moscow. On July 24, Nixon was touring the exhibits with Nikita Khrushchev when the two stopped at a model of an American kitchen and engaged in an impromptu exchange about the merits of capitalism versus communism that became known as the "Kitchen Debate".

=== 1960 presidential campaign ===
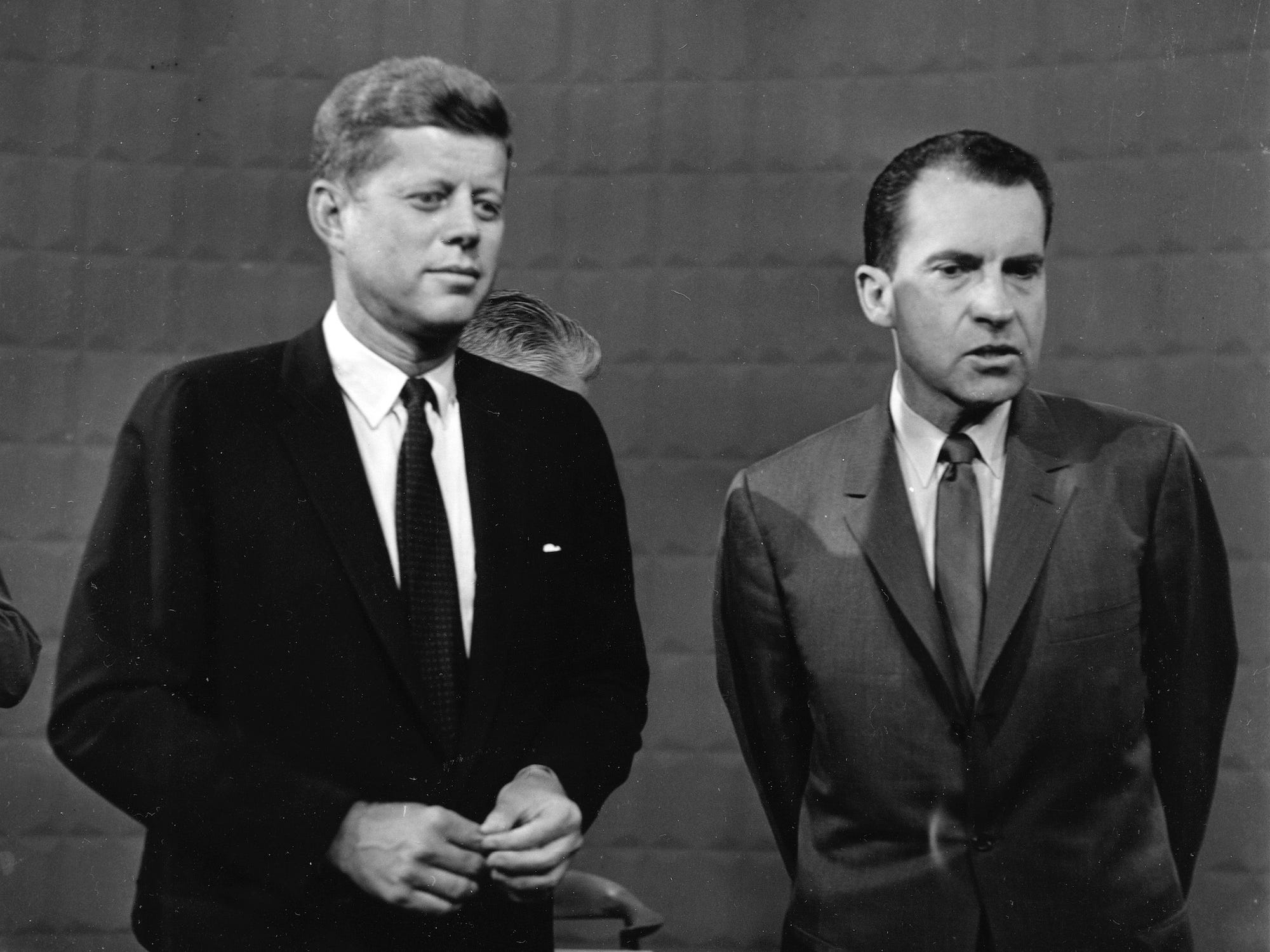
John F. Kennedy and Nixon before their first televised 1960 debate

In 1960, Nixon launched his first campaign for President of the United States, officially announcing on January 9, 1960. He faced little opposition in the Republican primaries and chose former Massachusetts senator Henry Cabot Lodge Jr. as his running mate. His Democratic opponent was John F. Kennedy and the race remained close for the duration. Nixon campaigned on his experience, but Kennedy called for new blood and claimed the Eisenhower–Nixon administration had allowed the Soviet Union to overtake the U.S. in quantity and quality of ballistic missiles. While Kennedy faced issues about his Catholicism, Nixon remained a divisive figure to some.

1960 presidential election results

Televised presidential debates made their debut as a political medium during the campaign. In the first of four such debates, Nixon appeared pale, with a five o'clock shadow, in contrast to the photogenic Kennedy. Nixon's performance in the debate was perceived to be mediocre in the visual medium of television, though many people listening on the radio thought Nixon had won. Nixon narrowly lost the election, with Kennedy winning the popular vote by only 112,827 votes (0.2 percent).

There were charges of voter fraud in Texas and Illinois, both states won by Kennedy. Nixon refused to consider contesting the election, feeling a lengthy controversy would diminish the United States in the eyes of the world and that the uncertainty would hurt U.S. interests. At the end of his term of office as vice president in January 1961, Nixon and his family returned to California, where he practiced law and wrote a bestselling book, Six Crises, which included coverage of the Hiss case, Eisenhower's heart attack, and the Fund Crisis, which had been resolved by the Checkers speech.

== Wilderness years (1961–1969) ==
=== 1962 California gubernatorial campaign ===
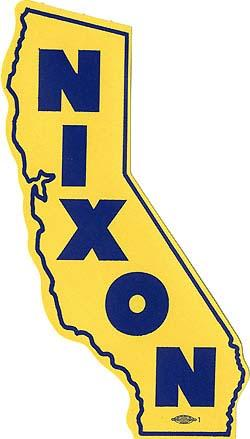
1962 California gubernatorial campaign sticker

Local and national Republican leaders encouraged Nixon to challenge incumbent Pat Brown for governor of California in the 1962 gubernatorial election. Despite initial reluctance, Nixon entered the race. The campaign was clouded by public suspicion that Nixon viewed the office as a stepping stone for another presidential run, some opposition from the far-right of the party, and his own lack of interest in being California's governor. Nixon hoped a successful run would confirm his status as the nation's leading active Republican politician and ensure he remained a major player in national politics. Instead, he lost to Brown by more than five percentage points, and the defeat was widely believed to be the end of his political career.

In an impromptu concession speech, the morning after the election, Nixon blamed the media for favoring his opponent, saying, "You won't have Nixon to kick around anymore because, gentlemen, this is my last press conference." The California defeat was highlighted in the November 11, 1962, episode of Howard K. Smith's ABC News show, Howard K. Smith: News and Comment, titled "The Political Obituary of Richard M. Nixon". Alger Hiss appeared on the program, and many members of the public complained that it was unseemly to give a convicted felon air time to attack a former vice president. The furor drove Smith and his program from the air, and public sympathy for Nixon grew.

=== Wilderness years ===
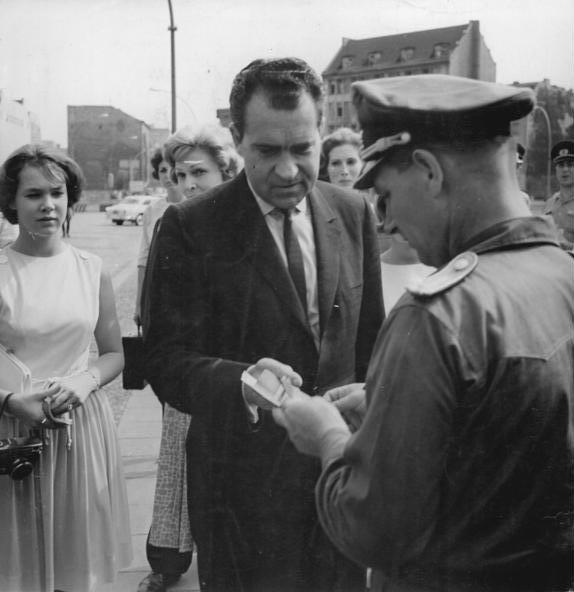
Nixon shows his papers to an East German officer as he crosses between the sectors of divided Berlin in July 1963

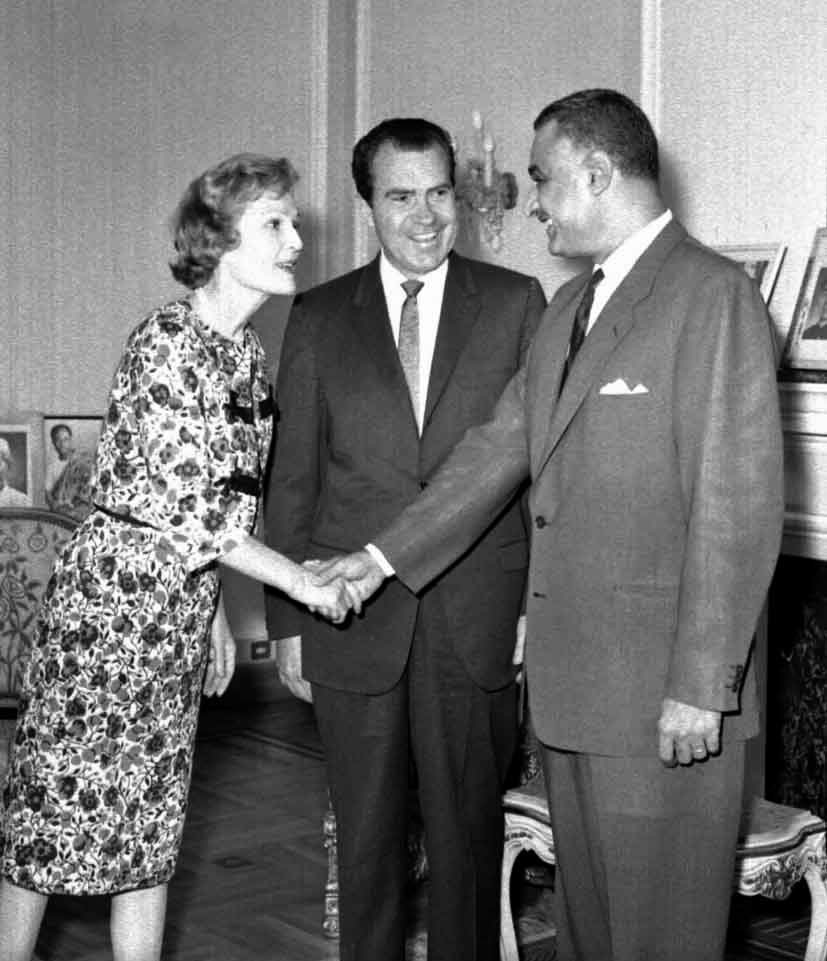
Richard and Pat Nixon meeting with Egyptian President Gamal Abdel Nasser, Cairo in September 1963

In 1963, the Nixon family traveled to Europe, where Nixon gave press conferences and met with leaders of the countries he visited. The family moved to New York City, where Nixon became a senior partner in the leading law firm Nixon, Mudge, Rose, Guthrie & Alexander. On the morning of November 22, 1963, Nixon was in Dallas, staying at the Baker Hotel. He left the city via Love Field an hour before the arrival of Air Force One, and well before Kennedy's assassination that afternoon. When announcing his California campaign, Nixon had pledged not to run for president in 1964; even if he had not, he believed it would be difficult to defeat Kennedy, or after his death, Lyndon Johnson.

In 1964, Nixon won write-in votes in the primaries, and was considered a serious contender by both Gallup polls and members of the press. He was even placed on a primary ballot as an active candidate by Oregon's secretary of state. As late as two months before the 1964 Republican National Convention, however, Nixon fulfilled his promise to remain out of the presidential nomination process and instead endorsed Arizona senator Barry Goldwater, the eventual Republican nominee. When Goldwater won the nomination, Nixon was selected to introduce him at the convention. Nixon felt that Goldwater was unlikely to win, but campaigned for him loyally. In the 1964 general election, Goldwater lost in a landslide to Johnson and Republicans experienced heavy losses in Congress and among state governors.

Nixon was one of the few leading Republicans not blamed for the disastrous results, and he sought to build on that in the 1966 congressional elections in which he campaigned for many Republicans and sought to regain seats lost in the Johnson landslide. Nixon was credited with helping Republicans win major electoral gains that year.

In 1967, Nixon was approached by an associate at his firm in Leonard Garment about a case involving the press and perceived invasion of privacy. Garment suggested Nixon argue on behalf of the Hill family in Time, Inc. v. Hill at the Supreme Court of the United States. Nixon studied strenuously in the months before the oral argument before the Court. While the final decision was in favor of Time Inc., Nixon was encouraged by the praise he received for his argument. It was the first and only case he argued in front of the Supreme Court.

=== 1968 presidential campaign ===
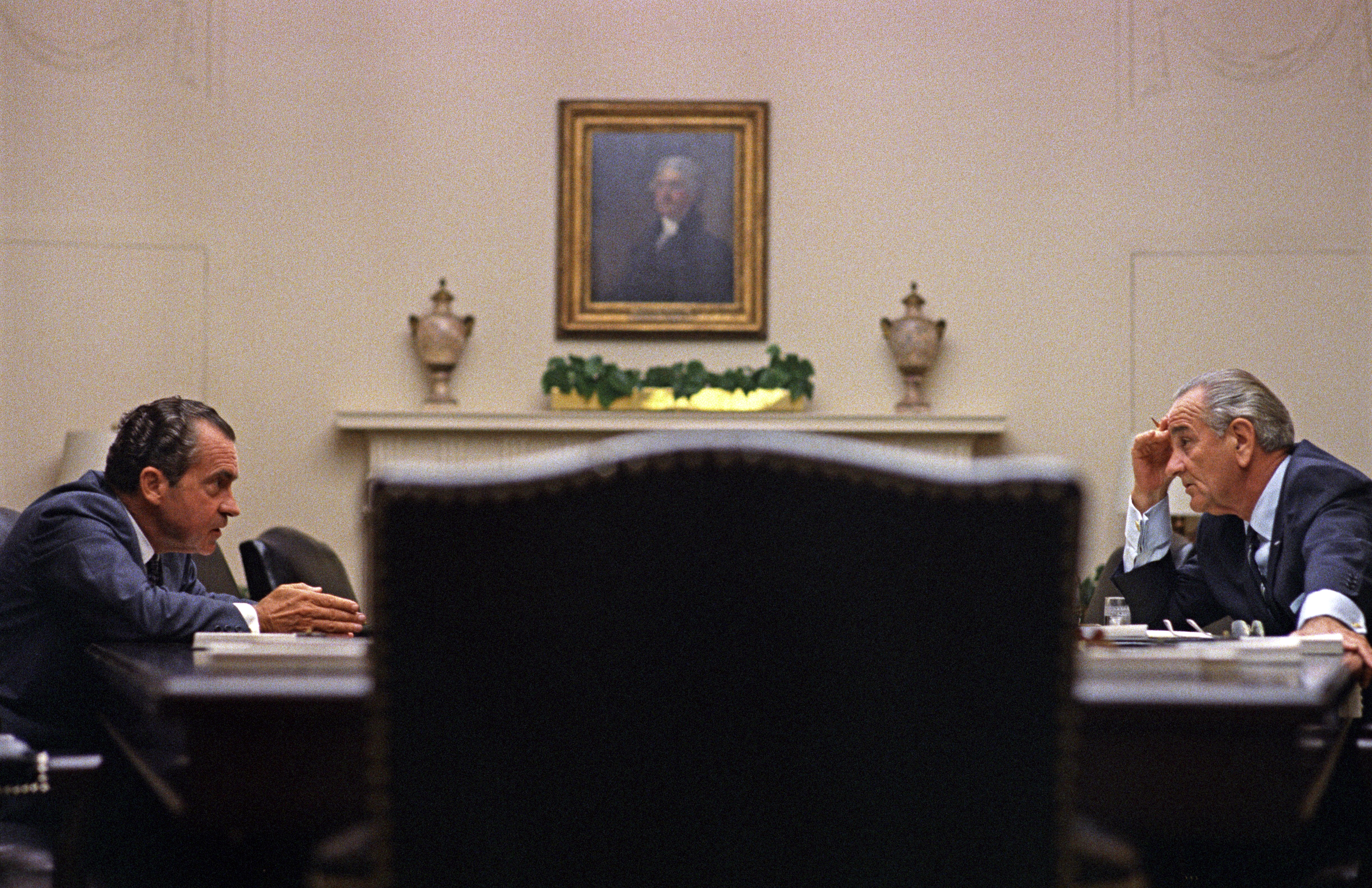
Nixon and President Lyndon B. Johnson meet at the White House before Nixon's nomination in July 1968

At the end of 1967, Nixon told his family he planned to run for president a second time. Pat Nixon did not always enjoy public life, being embarrassed, for example, by the need to reveal how little the family owned in the Checkers speech. She still managed to be supportive of her husband's ambitions. Nixon believed that with the Democrats torn over the issue of the Vietnam War, a Republican had a good chance of winning, although he expected the election to be as close as in 1960.

An exceptionally tumultuous primary election season began as the Tet Offensive was launched in January 1968. President Johnson withdrew as a candidate in March, after an unexpectedly poor showing in the New Hampshire primary. In June, Senator Robert F. Kennedy, a Democratic candidate, was assassinated just moments after his victory in the California primary. On the Republican side, Nixon's main opposition was Michigan governor George Romney, though New York governor Nelson Rockefeller and California governor Ronald Reagan each hoped to be nominated in a brokered convention. Nixon secured the nomination on the first ballot. He was able to secure the nomination to the support of many Southern delegates, after he and his subordinates made concessions to Strom Thurmond and Harry Dent. He selected Maryland governor Spiro Agnew as his running mate, a choice which Nixon believed would unite the party, appealing both to Northern moderates and to Southerners disaffected with the Democrats.

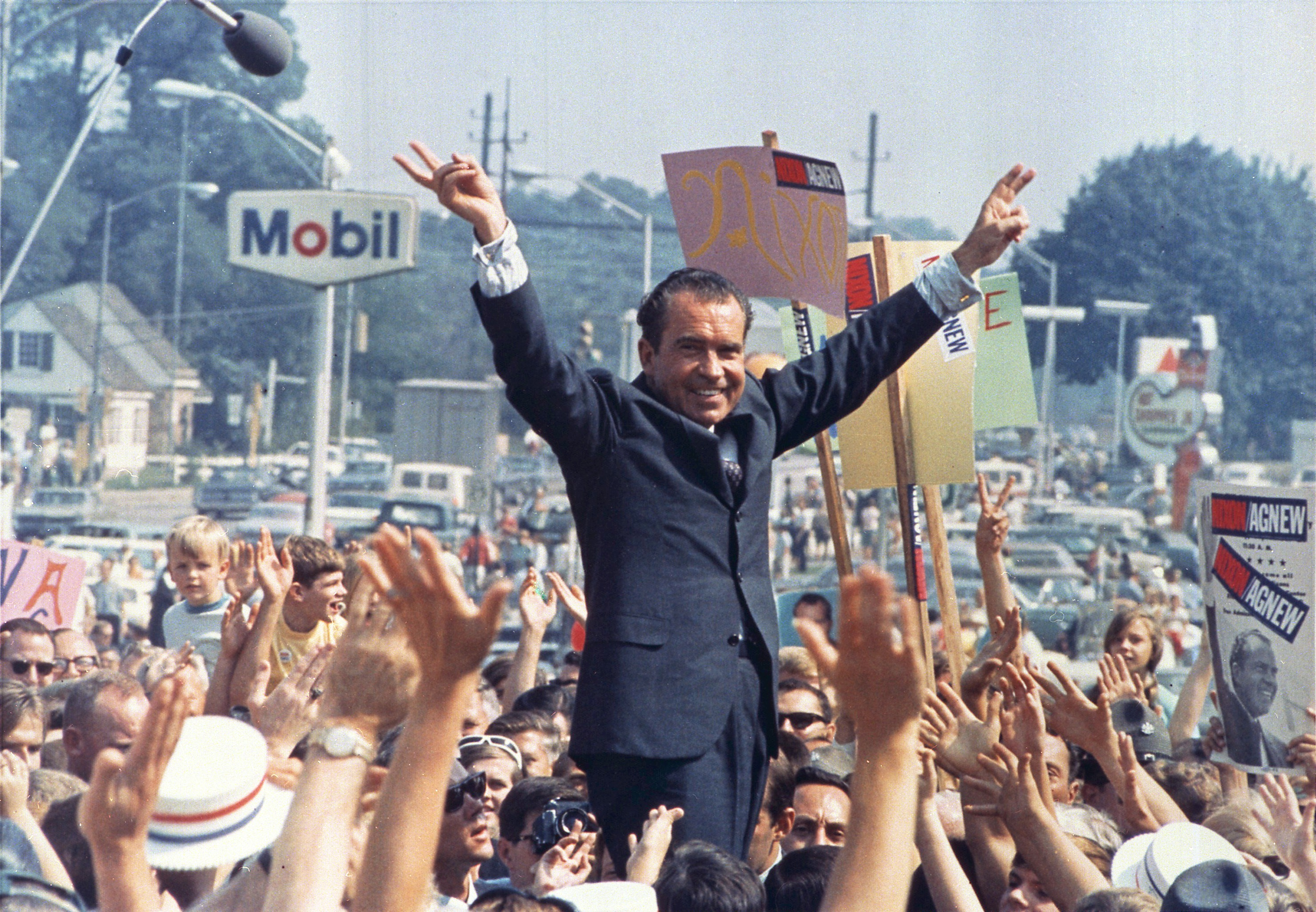
Nixon campaigning for president in Paoli, Pennsylvania, July 1968

Results of the 1968 presidential election; the popular vote split between Nixon and Democrat Hubert Humphrey was less than one percentage point.

Nixon's Democratic opponent in the general election was Vice President Hubert Humphrey, who was nominated at a convention marked by violent protests. Throughout the campaign, Nixon portrayed himself as a figure of stability during this period of national unrest and upheaval. He appealed to what he later called the "silent majority" of socially conservative Americans who disliked the hippie counterculture and the anti-war demonstrators. Agnew became an increasingly vocal critic of these groups, solidifying Nixon's position with the right.

Nixon waged a prominent television advertising campaign, meeting with supporters in front of cameras. He stressed that the crime rate was too high, and attacked what he perceived as a surrender of the United States' nuclear superiority by the Democrats. Nixon promised "peace with honor" in the Vietnam War and proclaimed that "new leadership will end the war and win the peace in the Pacific". He did not give specifics of how he hoped to end the war, resulting in media intimations that he must have a "secret plan". His slogan of "Nixon's the One" proved to be effective.

Johnson's negotiators hoped to reach a truce in Vietnam, or at least a cessation of bombings. On October 22, 1968, candidate Nixon received information that Johnson was preparing a so-called "October surprise", abandoning three non-negotiable conditions for a bombing halt, to help elect Humphrey in the last days of the campaign. Whether the Nixon campaign interfered with negotiations between the Johnson administration and the South Vietnamese by engaging Anna Chennault, a fundraiser for the Republican party, remains a controversy. It is not clear whether the government of South Vietnam needed encouragement to opt out of a peace process they considered disadvantageous.

In a three-way race between Nixon, Humphrey, and American Independent Party candidate George Wallace, Nixon defeated Humphrey by only 500,000 votes, a margin almost as close as in 1960, with both elections seeing a gap of less than one percentage point of the popular vote. However, Nixon earned 301 electoral votes to 191 for Humphrey and 46 for Wallace, a majority. He became the first non-incumbent vice president to be elected president. In his victory speech, Nixon pledged that his administration would try to bring the divided nation together. Nixon said: "I have received a very gracious message from the Vice President, congratulating me for winning the election. I congratulated him for his gallant and courageous fight against great odds. I also told him that I know exactly how he felt. I know how it feels to lose a close one."

== Presidency (1969–1974) ==
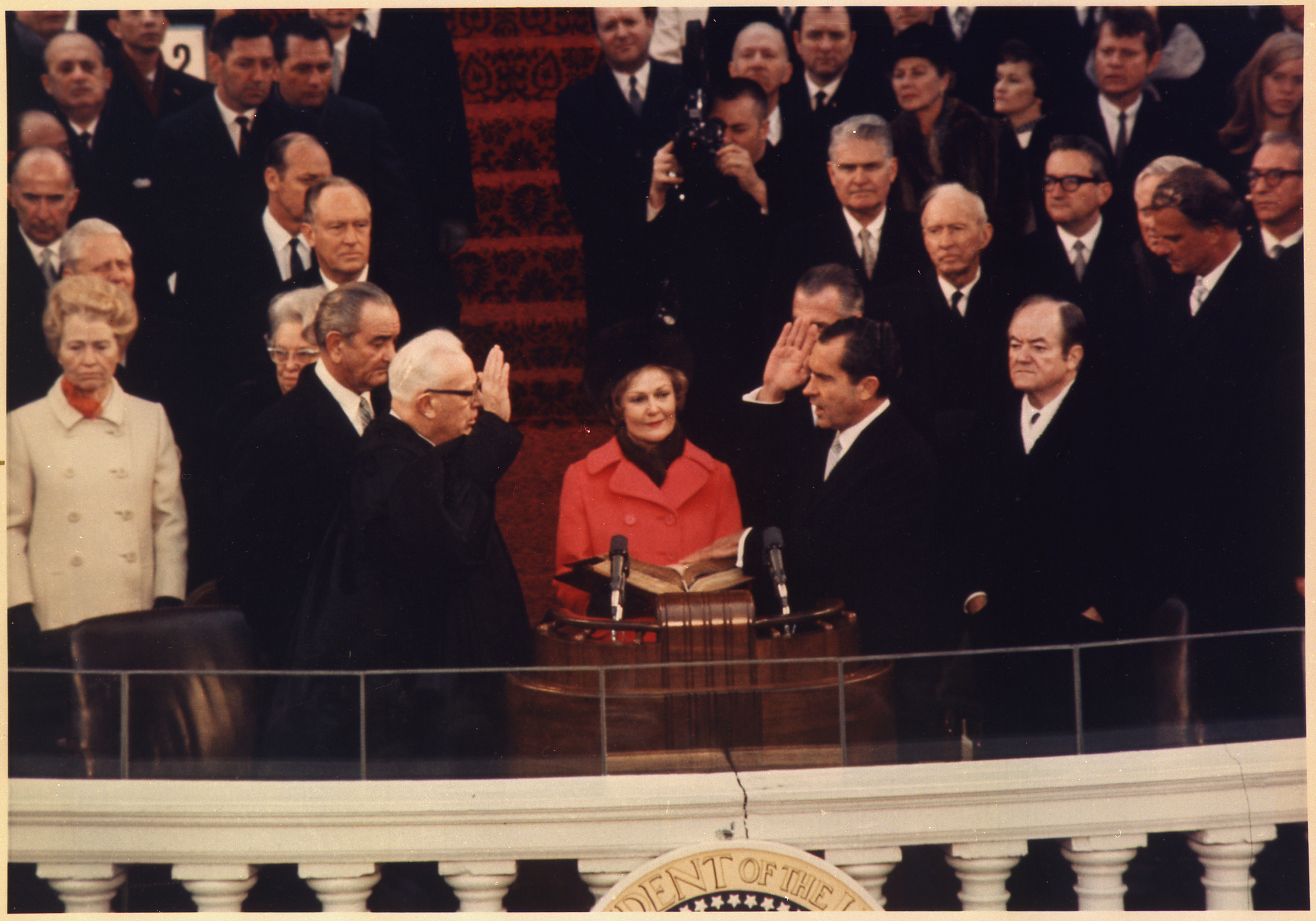
Nixon is sworn in as the 37th president by Chief Justice Earl Warren. The new first lady, Pat, holds the family Bible.

Nixon was inaugurated as president on January 20, 1969, sworn in by his onetime political rival, Chief Justice Earl Warren. Pat Nixon held the family Bibles open at Isaiah 2:4, which reads, "They shall beat their swords into plowshares, and their spears into pruning hooks." In his inaugural address, which received almost uniformly positive reviews, Nixon remarked that "the greatest honor history can bestow is the title of peacemaker"—a phrase that found a place on his gravestone. He spoke about turning partisan politics into a new age of unity:

In these difficult years, America has suffered from a fever of words; from inflated rhetoric that promises more than it can deliver; from angry rhetoric that fans discontents into hatreds; from bombastic rhetoric that postures instead of persuading. We cannot learn from one another until we stop shouting at one another, until we speak quietly enough so that our words can be heard as well as our voices.

=== Foreign policy ===
==== China ====
President Nixon shakes hands with Chinese Premier Zhou Enlai upon arriving in Beijing, 1972

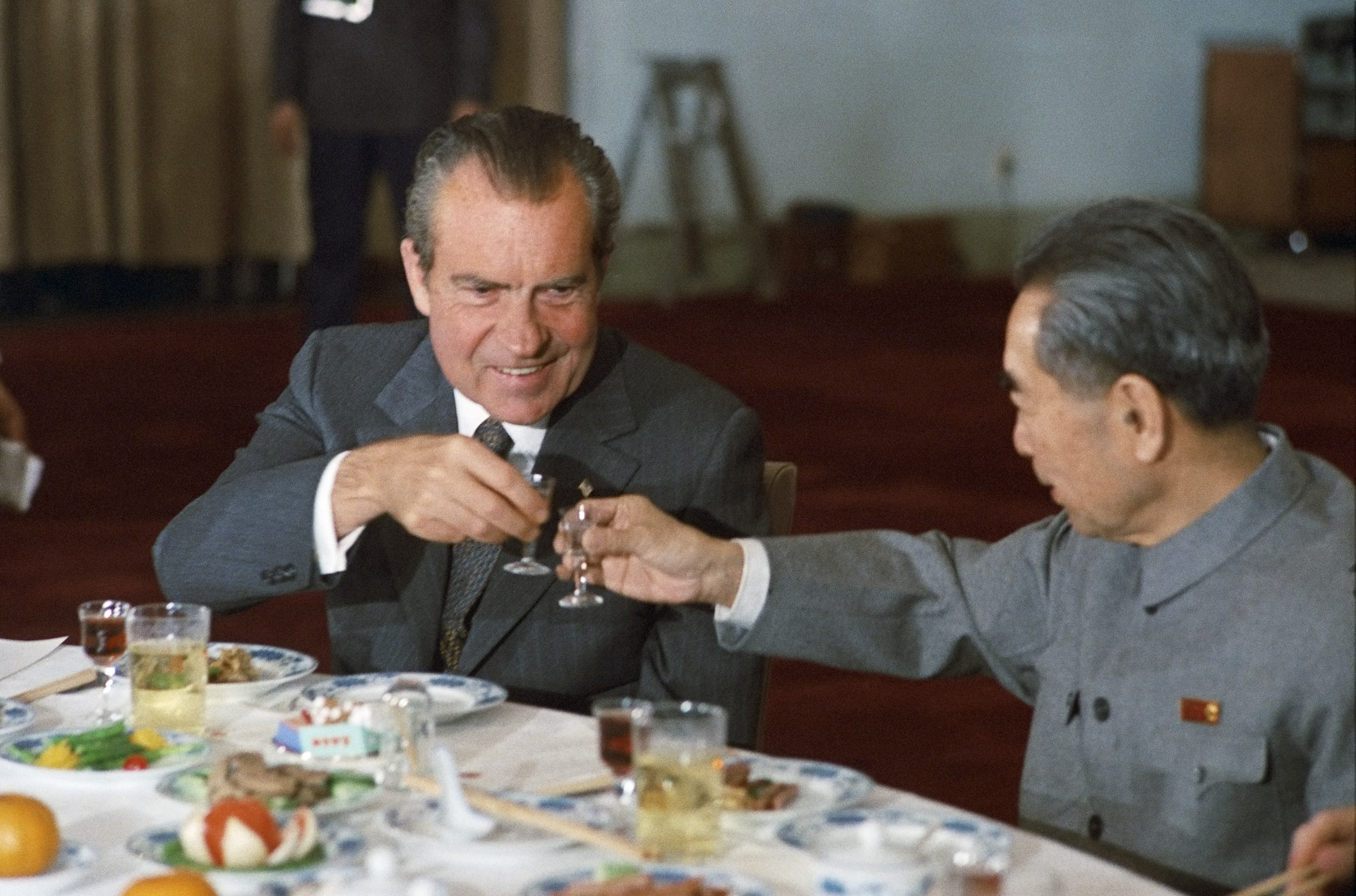
Nixon and Zhou Enlai toast during Nixon's 1972 visit to China

Nixon laid the groundwork for his overture to China before he became president, writing in Foreign Affairs a year before his election: "There is no place on this small planet for a billion of its potentially most able people to live in angry isolation." Among the reasons that Nixon sought to improve relations with China was in the hope of weakening the Soviet Union and decreasing China's support to the North in the Vietnam War. Nixon ultimately used the idea of gaining leverage against the Soviet Union through relations with China to obtain the support of key conservative figures including Barry Goldwater and Ronald Reagan.

Assisting him in pursuing relations with China was Henry Kissinger, Nixon's national security advisor and future secretary of state. They collaborated closely, bypassing Cabinet officials. With relations between the Soviet Union and China at a nadir—border clashes between the two took place during Nixon's first year in office—Nixon sent private word to the Chinese that he desired closer relations. A breakthrough came in early 1971, when Chinese Communist Party (CCP) chairman Mao Zedong invited a team of American table tennis players to visit China and play against top Chinese players. Nixon followed up by sending Kissinger to China for clandestine meetings with Chinese officials. On July 15, 1971, with announcements from Washington and Beijing, it was learned that the President would visit China the following February. The secrecy had allowed both sets of leaders time to prepare the political climate in their countries for the visit.

In February 1972, Nixon and his wife traveled to China after Kissinger briefed Nixon for over 40 hours in preparation. Upon touching down, the President and First Lady emerged from Air Force One and were greeted by Chinese Premier Zhou Enlai. Nixon made a point of shaking Zhou's hand, something which then-secretary of state John Foster Dulles had refused to do in 1954 when the two met in Geneva. More than a hundred television journalists accompanied the president. On Nixon's orders, television was strongly favored over printed publications, as Nixon felt that the medium would capture the visit much better than print. It also allowed him to snub the print journalists he despised.

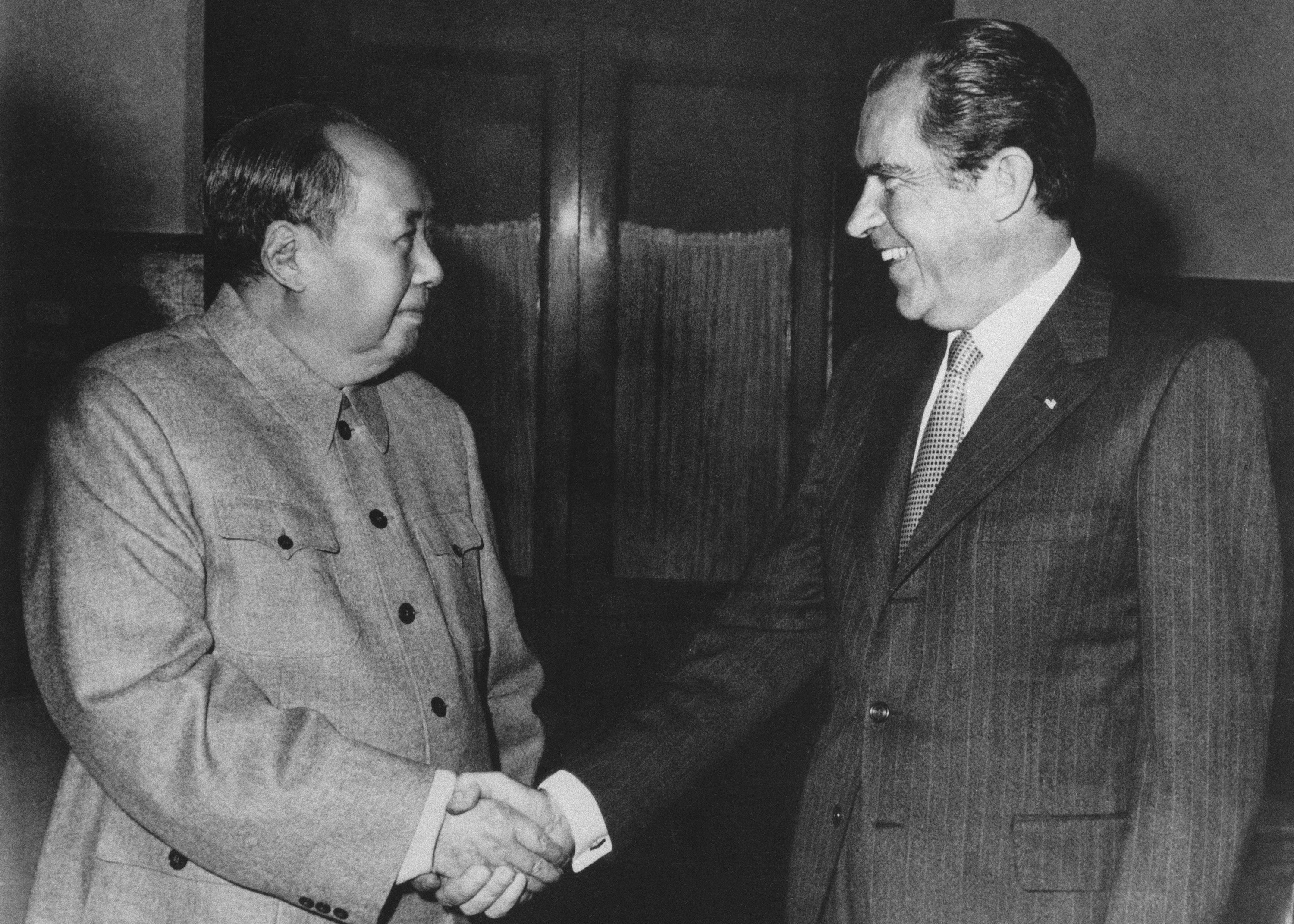
Mao Zedong and Nixon

Nixon and Kissinger immediately met for an hour with CCP Chairman Mao Zedong and Premier Zhou at Mao's official private residence, where they discussed a range of issues. Mao later told his doctor that he had been impressed by Nixon's forthrightness, unlike the leftists and the Soviets. He said he was suspicious of Kissinger, though the National Security Advisor referred to their meeting as his "encounter with history". A formal banquet welcoming the presidential party was given that evening in the Great Hall of the People. The following day, Nixon met with Zhou; the joint communique following this meeting recognized Taiwan as a part of China and looked forward to a peaceful solution to the problem of reunification. When not in meetings, Nixon toured architectural wonders, including the Forbidden City, the Ming tombs, and the Great Wall. Americans took their first glance into everyday Chinese life through the cameras that accompanied Pat Nixon, who toured the city of Beijing and visited communes, schools, factories, and hospitals.

The visit ushered in a new era of US–China relations. Fearing the possibility of a US–China alliance, the Soviet Union yielded to pressure for détente with the United States. This was one component of triangular diplomacy.

==== Vietnam War ====
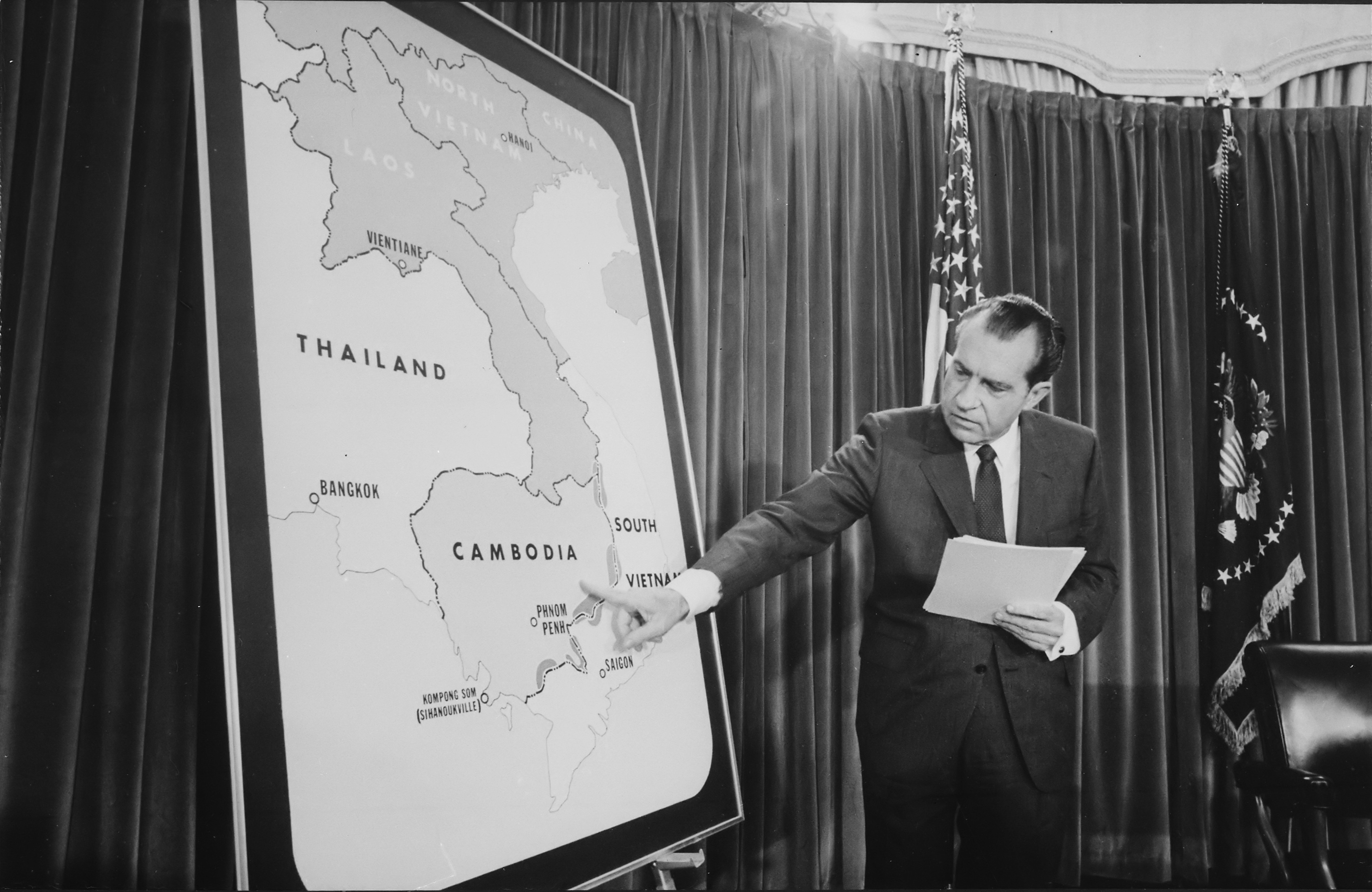
Nixon delivers an address to the nation about the incursion in Cambodia

When Nixon took office, about 300 American soldiers were dying each week in Vietnam, and the war was widely unpopular in the United States, the subject of ongoing violent protests. The Johnson administration had offered to suspend bombing unconditionally in exchange for negotiations, but to no avail. According to Walter Isaacson, Nixon concluded soon after taking office that the Vietnam War could not be won, and he was determined to end it quickly. He sought an arrangement that would permit American forces to withdraw while leaving South Vietnam secure against attack.

Nixon approved a secret B-52 carpet bombing campaign of North Vietnamese and Khmer Rouge positions in Cambodia beginning in March 1969 and code-named Operation Menu, without the consent of Cambodian leader Norodom Sihanouk. In mid-1969, Nixon began efforts to negotiate peace with the North Vietnamese, sending a personal letter to their leaders, and peace talks began in Paris. Initial talks did not result in an agreement, and in May 1969, he publicly proposed to withdraw all American troops from South Vietnam, provided North Vietnam did so, and suggested South Vietnam hold internationally supervised elections with Viet Cong participation.

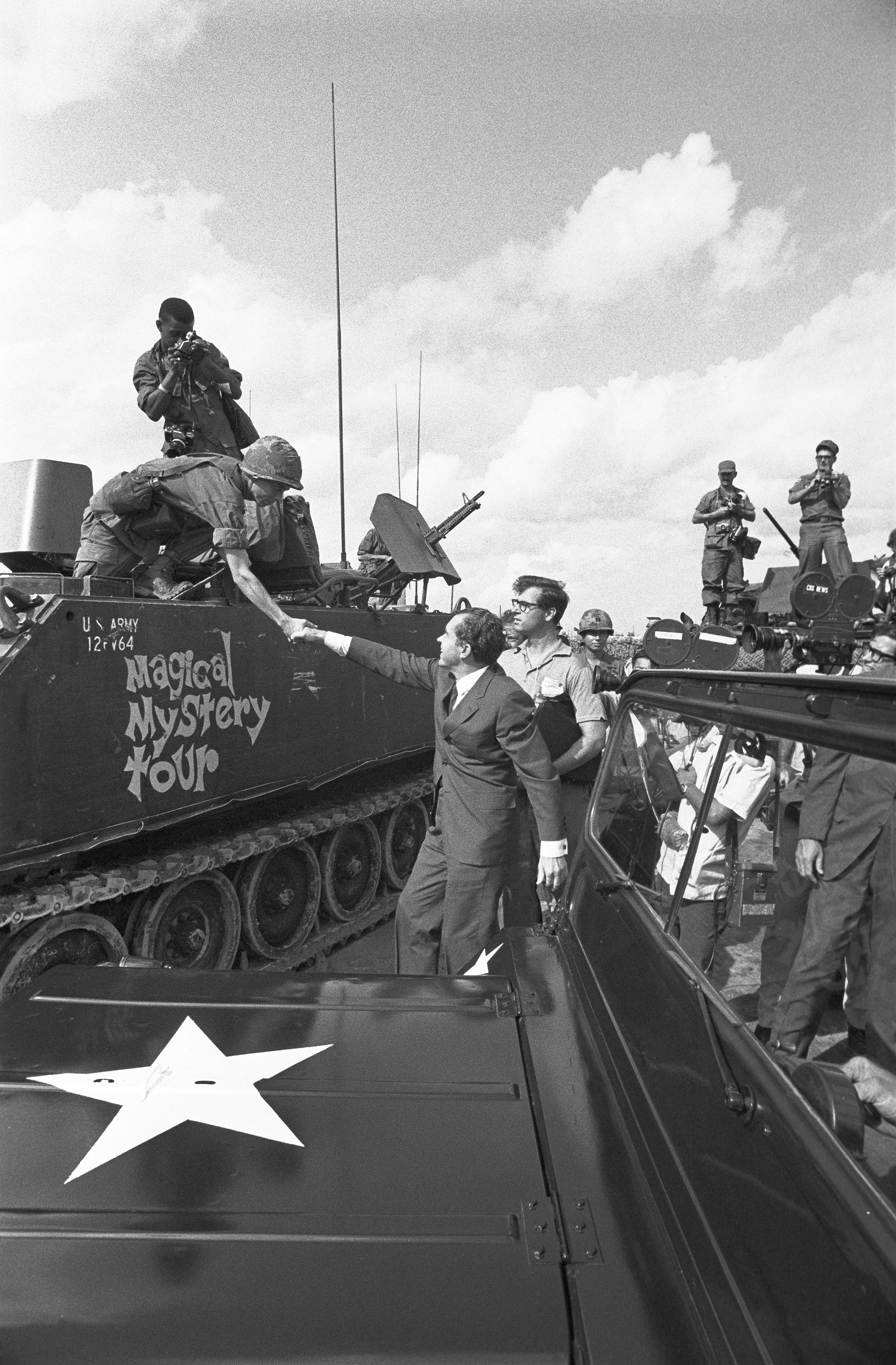
Nixon visits American troops in South Vietnam, July 30, 1969

In July 1969, Nixon visited South Vietnam, where he met with his U.S. military commanders and President Nguyễn Văn Thiệu. Amid protests at home demanding an immediate pullout, he implemented a strategy of replacing American troops with Vietnamese troops, known as "Vietnamization". He soon instituted phased U.S. troop withdrawals, but also authorized incursions into Laos, in part to interrupt the Ho Chi Minh trail passing through Laos and Cambodia and used to supply North Vietnamese forces. In March 1970, at the explicit request of the Khmer Rouge and negotiated by Pol Pot's then-second-in-command, Nuon Chea, North Vietnamese troops launched an offensive and overran much of Cambodia. Nixon announced the ground invasion of Cambodia on April 30, 1970, against North Vietnamese bases in the east of the country, and further protests erupted against perceived expansion of the conflict, which resulted in Ohio National Guardsmen killing four unarmed students at Kent State University. Nixon's responses to protesters included an impromptu, early morning meeting with them at the Lincoln Memorial on May 9, 1970. Nixon's campaign promise to curb the war, contrasted with the escalated bombing, led to claims that Nixon had a "credibility gap" on the issue. It is estimated that between 50,000 and 150,000 people were killed during the bombing of Cambodia between 1970 and 1973.

In 1971, excerpts from the "Pentagon Papers", which had been leaked by Daniel Ellsberg, were published by The New York Times and The Washington Post. When news of the leak first appeared, Nixon was inclined to do nothing; the Papers, a history of the United States' involvement in Vietnam, mostly concerned the lies of prior administrations and contained few real revelations. He was persuaded by Kissinger that the Papers were more harmful than they appeared, and the President tried to prevent publication, but the Supreme Court ruled in favor of the newspapers.

As U.S. troop withdrawals continued, conscription was phased out by 1973, and the armed forces became all-volunteer. After years of fighting, the Paris Peace Accords were signed at the beginning of 1973. The agreement implemented a ceasefire and allowed for the withdrawal of remaining American troops without requiring the withdrawal of the 160,000 North Vietnam Army regulars located in the South. Once American combat support ended, there was a brief truce, before fighting resumed, and North Vietnam conquered South Vietnam in 1975.

==== Latin American policy ====
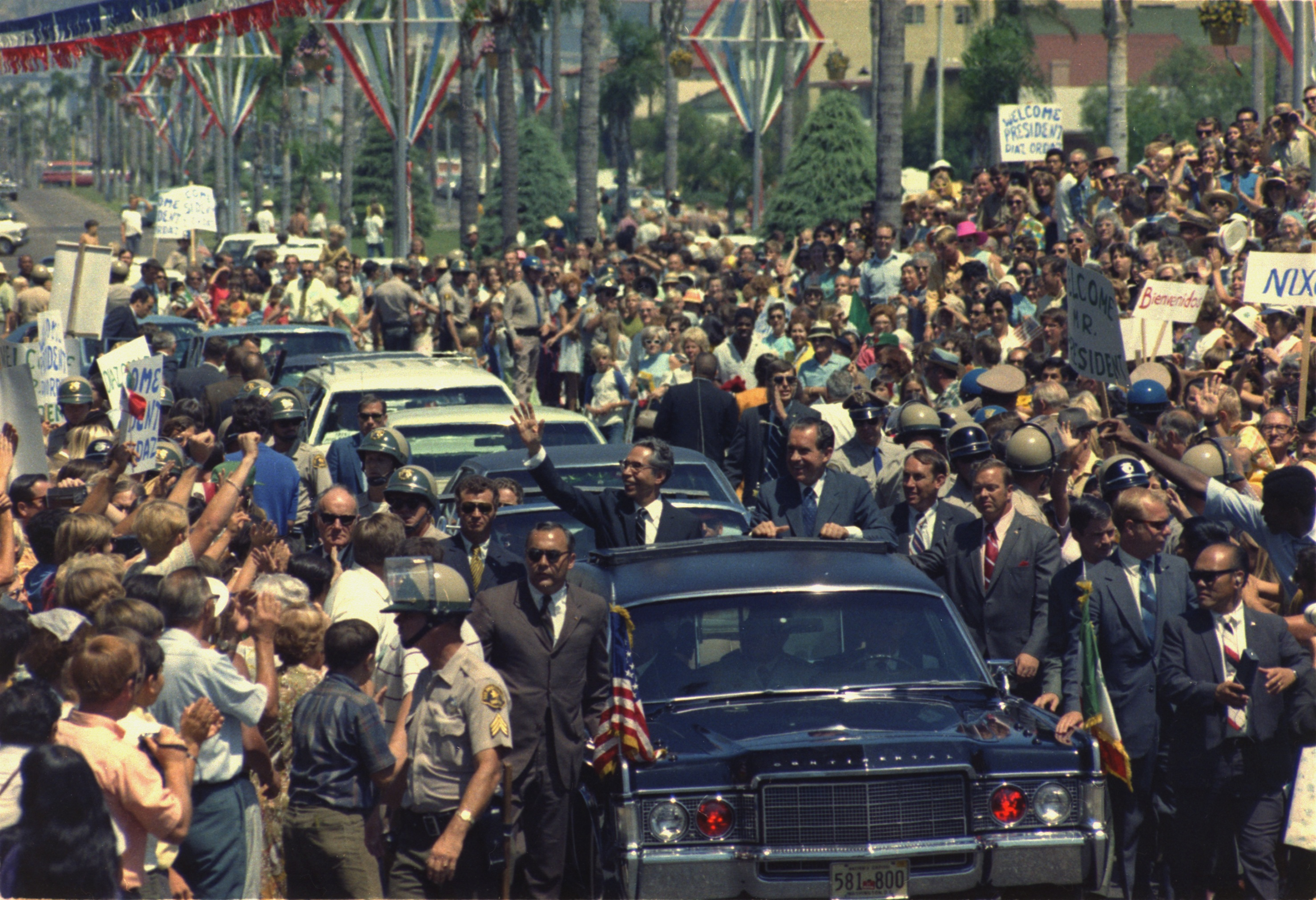
Nixon with Mexican president Gustavo Díaz Ordaz (to his right); motorcade in San Diego, California, September 1970

Nixon had been a firm supporter of Kennedy during the 1961 Bay of Pigs Invasion and 1962 Cuban Missile Crisis. On taking office in 1969, he stepped up covert operations against Cuba and its president, Fidel Castro. He maintained close relations with the Cuban-American exile community through his friend, Bebe Rebozo, who often suggested ways of irritating Castro. The Soviets and Cubans became concerned, fearing Nixon might attack Cuba and break the understanding between Kennedy and Khrushchev that ended the missile crisis. In August 1970, the Soviets asked Nixon to reaffirm the understanding, which he did, despite his hard line against Castro. The process was not completed before the Soviets began expanding their base at the Cuban port of Cienfuegos in October 1970. A minor confrontation ensued, the Soviets stipulated they would not use Cienfuegos for submarines bearing ballistic missiles, and the final round of diplomatic notes was exchanged in November.

The election of Marxist candidate Salvador Allende as President of Chile in September 1970 spurred a vigorous campaign of covert opposition to him by Nixon and Kissinger. This began by trying to convince the Chilean congress to confirm Jorge Alessandri as the winner of the election, and then messages to military officers in support of a coup. Other support included strikes organized against Allende and funding for Allende opponents. It was even alleged that "Nixon personally authorized" $700,000 in covert funds to print anti-Allende messages in a prominent Chilean newspaper. Following an extended period of social, political, and economic unrest, General Augusto Pinochet assumed power in a violent coup d'état on September 11, 1973; among the dead was Allende.

==== Soviet Union ====
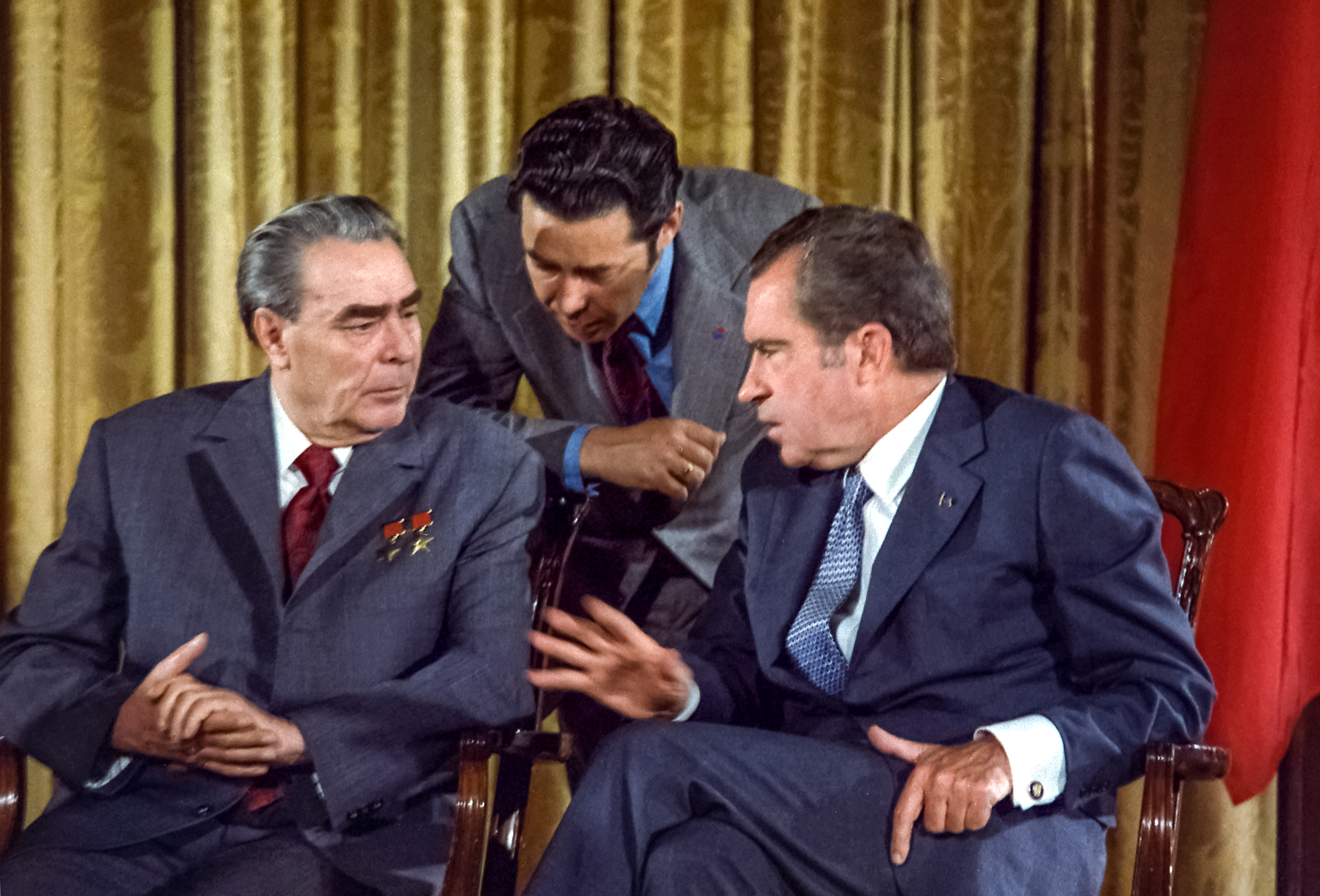
Nixon with Brezhnev during the Soviet leader's trip to the U.S., 1973

Nixon used the improving international environment to address the topic of nuclear peace. Following the announcement of his visit to China, the Nixon administration concluded negotiations for him to visit the Soviet Union. The President and First Lady arrived in Moscow on May 22, 1972, and met with Leonid Brezhnev, the general secretary of the Communist Party; Alexei Kosygin, the Chairman of the Council of Ministers; and Nikolai Podgorny, the Chairman of the Presidium of the Supreme Soviet, among other leading Soviet officials.

Nixon engaged in intense negotiations with Brezhnev. Out of the summit came agreements for increased trade and two landmark arms control treaties: SALT I, the first comprehensive limitation pact signed by the two superpowers, and the Anti-Ballistic Missile Treaty, which banned the development of systems designed to intercept incoming missiles. Nixon and Brezhnev proclaimed a new era of "peaceful coexistence". A banquet was held that evening at the Kremlin.

Nixon and Kissinger planned to link arms control to détente and to the resolution of other urgent problems through what Nixon called "linkage". David Tal argues:

The linkage between strategic arms limitations and outstanding issues such as the Middle East, Berlin, and, foremost, Vietnam thus became central to Nixon's and Kissinger's policy of détente. Through the employment of linkage, they hoped to change the nature and course of U.S. foreign policy, including U.S. nuclear disarmament and arms control policy, and to separate them from those practiced by Nixon's predecessors. They also intended, through linkage, to make U.S. arms control policy part of détente ... His policy of linkage had, in fact, failed. It failed mainly because it was based on flawed assumptions and false premises, the foremost of which was that the Soviet Union wanted the Strategic Arms Limitation Agreement much more than the United States did.

Seeking to foster better relations with the United States, China and the Soviet Union both cut back on their diplomatic support for North Vietnam and advised Hanoi to come to terms militarily. Nixon later described his strategy:

I had long believed that an indispensable element of any successful peace initiative in Vietnam was to enlist, if possible, the help of the Soviets and the Chinese. Though rapprochement with China and détente with the Soviet Union were ends in themselves, I also considered them possible means to hasten the end of the war. At worst, Hanoi was bound to feel less confident if Washington was dealing with Moscow and Beijing. At best, if the two major Communist powers decided that they had bigger fish to fry, Hanoi would be pressured into negotiating a settlement we could accept.

In 1973, Nixon encouraged the Export-Import Bank to finance in part a trade deal with the Soviet Union in which Armand Hammer's Occidental Petroleum would export phosphate from Florida to the Soviet Union, and import Soviet ammonia. The deal, valued at $20 billion over 20 years, involved the construction of two major Soviet port facilities at Odessa and Ventspils, and a pipeline connecting four ammonia plants in the greater Volga region to the port at Odessa. In 1973, Nixon announced his administration was committed to seeking most favored nation trade status with the USSR, which was challenged by Congress in the Jackson-Vanik Amendment.

During the previous two years, Nixon had made considerable progress in U.S.–Soviet relations, and he embarked on a second trip to the Soviet Union in 1974. He arrived in Moscow on June 27 to a welcome ceremony, cheering crowds, and a state dinner at the Grand Kremlin Palace that evening. Nixon and Brezhnev met in Yalta, where they discussed a proposed mutual defense pact, détente, and MIRVs. Nixon considered proposing a comprehensive test-ban treaty, but he felt he would not have time to complete it during his presidency. There were no significant breakthroughs in these negotiations.

==== Middle Eastern policy ====
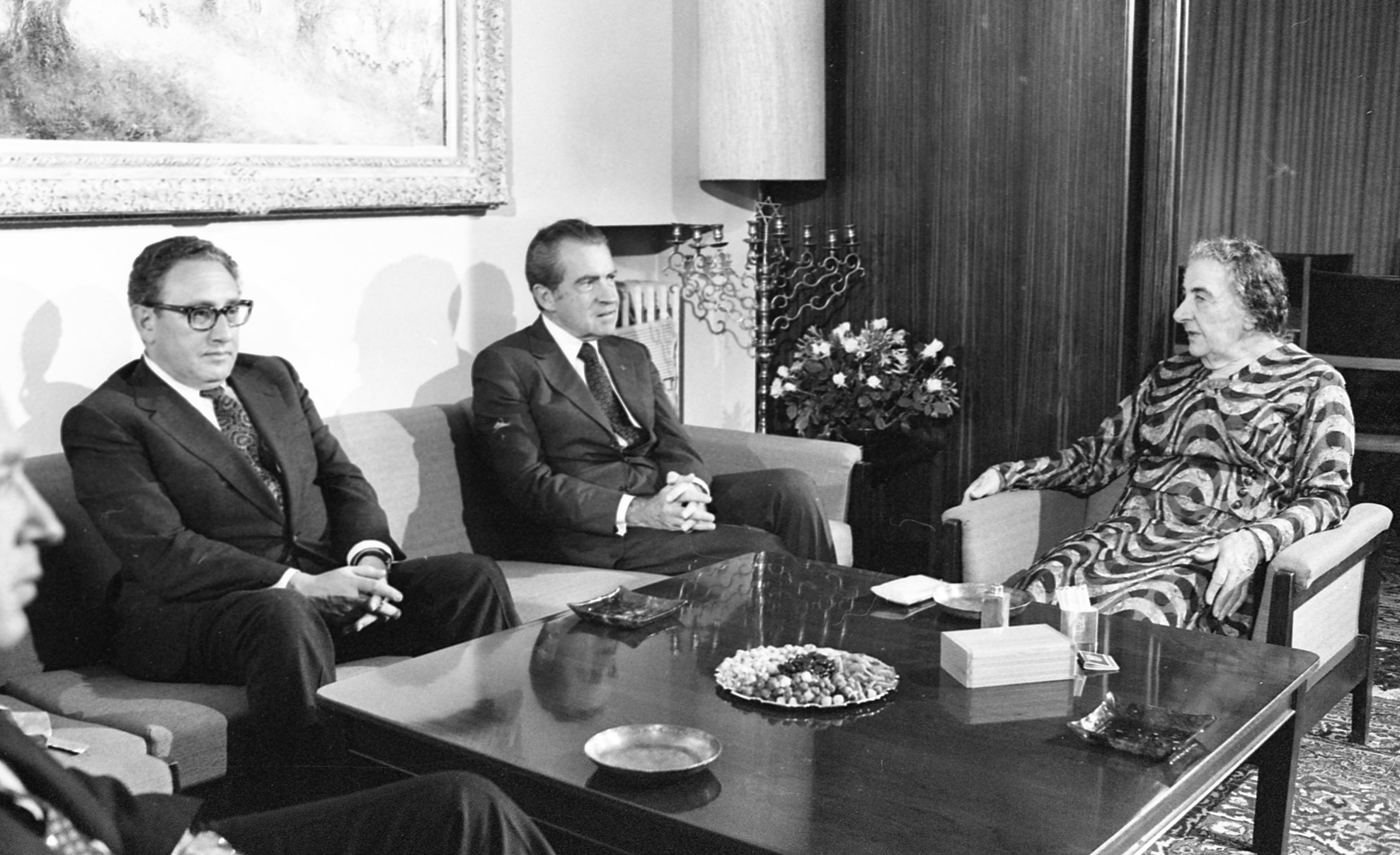
Nixon with Israeli Prime Minister Golda Meir, June 1974

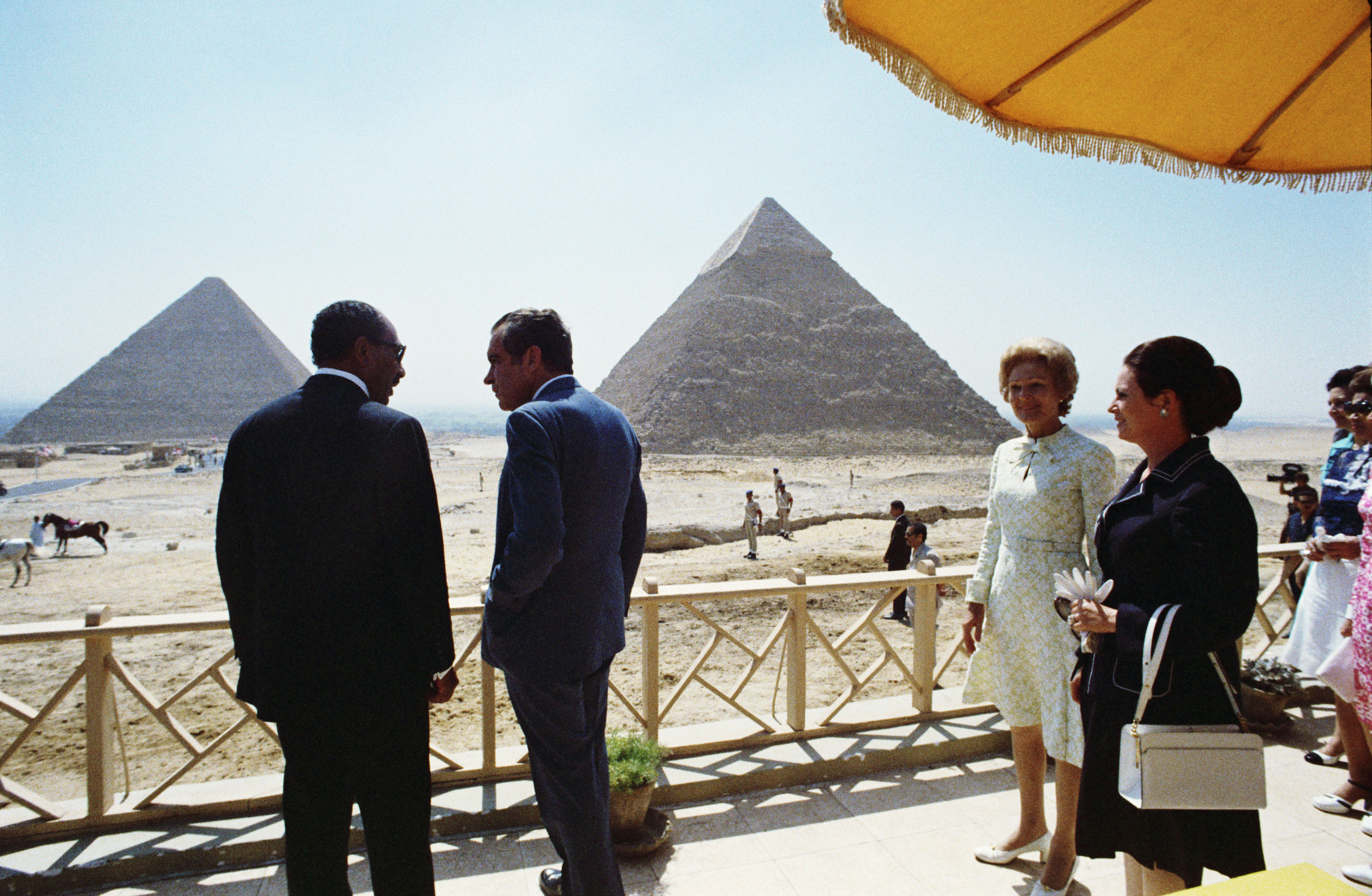
Nixon with President Anwar Sadat of Egypt, June 1974

As part of the Nixon Doctrine, the U.S. avoided giving direct combat assistance to its allies and instead assisted them to defend themselves. During the Nixon administration, the U.S. greatly increased arms sales to the Middle East, particularly Israel, Iran, and Saudi Arabia. The Nixon administration strongly supported Israel, an American ally in the Middle East, but the support was not unconditional. Nixon believed Israel should make peace with its Arab neighbors and that the U.S. should encourage it. The president believed that—except during the Suez Crisis—the U.S. had failed to intervene with Israel, and should use the leverage of the large U.S. military aid to Israel to urge the parties to the negotiating table. The Arab-Israeli conflict was not a major focus of Nixon's attention during his first term—for one thing, he felt that no matter what he did, American Jews would oppose his reelection. (Note: Black, pp. 583–585. In 1972, Nixon did more than double his percentage of the Jewish vote, from 17 percent to 35 percent. Merkley, p. 68.)

On October 6, 1973, an Arab coalition led by Egypt and Syria, supported with arms and materiel by the Soviet Union, attacked Israel in the Yom Kippur War. Israel suffered heavy losses, and Nixon ordered an airlift to resupply Israeli losses, cutting through inter-departmental squabbles and bureaucracy and taking personal responsibility for any response by Arab nations. More than a week later, by the time the U.S. and Soviet Union began negotiating a truce, Israel had penetrated deep into enemy territory. The truce negotiations rapidly escalated into a superpower crisis; when Israel gained the upper hand, Egyptian president Sadat requested a joint U.S.–USSR peacekeeping mission, which the U.S. refused. When Soviet Premier Brezhnev threatened to unilaterally enforce any peacekeeping mission militarily, Nixon ordered the U.S. military to DEFCON3, placing all U.S. military personnel and bases on alert for nuclear war. This was the closest the world had come to nuclear war since the Cuban Missile Crisis. Brezhnev backed down as a result of Nixon's actions.

Because Israel's victory was largely due to U.S. support, the Arab OPEC nations retaliated by refusing to sell crude oil to the U.S., resulting in the 1973 oil crisis. The embargo caused gasoline shortages and rationing in the United States in late 1973, but was eventually ended by the oil-producing nations as peace in the Middle East took hold.

After the war, and under Nixon's presidency, the U.S. reestablished relations with Egypt for the first time since 1967. Nixon used the Middle East crisis to restart the stalled Middle East Peace Negotiations; he wrote in a confidential memo to Kissinger on October 20:

I believe that, beyond a doubt, we are now facing the best opportunity we have had in 15 years to build a lasting peace in the Middle East. I am convinced history will hold us responsible if we let this opportunity slip by ... I now consider a permanent Middle East settlement to be the most important final goal to which we must devote ourselves.

Nixon made one of his final international visits as president to the Middle East in June 1974, and became the first president to visit Israel.

==== South Asia policy ====
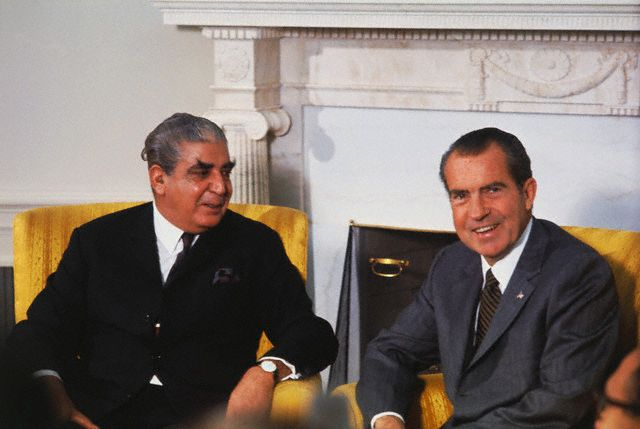
Nixon with Pakistani president Yahya Khan at the White House, October 1970

Since the 1960s, the United States has perceived Pakistan as an integral bulwark against global communism in the Cold War. Nixon was fond of Pakistani president Yahya Khan and, according to American journalist Gary Bass, "Nixon liked very few people, but he did like General Agha Muhammad Yahya Khan."

During the Bangladesh Liberation War, the United States stood by Pakistan against Bengali nationalists in terms of diplomacy and military threats. Nixon urged President Khan multiple times to exercise restraint, fearing an Indian invasion of Pakistan that would lead to Indian domination of the subcontinent and strengthen the position of the Soviet Union. In the wake of the Third India–Pakistan War, Nixon issued a statement blaming Pakistan for starting the conflict and blaming India for escalating it while personally favoring a ceasefire. The United States used the threat of an aid cut-off to force Pakistan to back down, while its continued military aid to Islamabad prevented India from launching incursions deeper into the country. Nixon denied getting involved in the situation, saying that it was an internal matter of Pakistan, but when Pakistan's defeat seemed certain, he sent the aircraft carrier USS Enterprise to the Bay of Bengal.

=== Domestic policy ===
==== Economy ====
Nixon at the Washington Senators' 1969 Opening Day with team owner Bob Short (arms folded) and Baseball Commissioner Bowie Kuhn (hand on mouth). Nixon's aide, Major Jack Brennan, sits behind them in uniform

At the time Nixon took office in 1969, inflation was at 4.7 percent—its highest rate since the Korean War. The Great Society had been enacted under Johnson, which, together with the Vietnam War costs, was causing large budget deficits. Unemployment was low, but interest rates were at their highest in a century. Nixon's major economic goal was to reduce inflation; the most obvious means of doing so was to end the war. This was not done in Nixon's first term, and the U.S. economy continued to struggle through 1970, contributing to a lackluster Republican performance in the midterm congressional elections (Democrats controlled both Houses of Congress throughout Nixon's presidency). According to political economist Nigel Bowles in his 2011 study of Nixon's economic record, the new president did little to alter Johnson's policies through the first year of his presidency.

Nixon was far more interested in foreign affairs than domestic policies, but he believed that voters tend to focus on their own financial condition and that economic conditions were a threat to his reelection. As part of his "New Federalism" philosophy, he proposed greater local autonomy in the allocation of domestic spending through grants to the states. These proposals were, for the most part, lost in the congressional budget process. However, Nixon gained political credit for advocating them. In 1970, Congress had granted the president the power to impose wage and price freezes, though the Democratic majorities, knowing Nixon had opposed such controls throughout his career, did not expect Nixon to actually use the authority. With inflation unresolved by August 1971, and an election year looming, Nixon convened a summit of his economic advisers at Camp David. Nixon's options were to limit fiscal and monetary expansionist policies that reduced unemployment or end the dollar's fixed exchange rate; Nixon's dilemma has been cited as an example of the Impossible trinity in international economics. He then announced temporary wage and price controls, allowed the dollar to float against other currencies, and ended the convertibility of the dollar into gold. Bowles points out,

by identifying himself with a policy whose purpose was inflation's defeat, Nixon made it difficult for Democratic opponents ... to criticize him. His opponents could offer no alternative policy that was either plausible or believable, since the one they favored was one they had designed but which the president had appropriated for himself.

Nixon's policies dampened inflation through 1972, although their aftereffects contributed to inflation during his second term and into the Ford administration. Nixon's decision to end the gold standard in the United States led to the collapse of the Bretton Woods system. According to Thomas Oatley, "the Bretton Woods system collapsed so that Nixon might win the 1972 presidential election."

After Nixon won re-election, inflation was returning. He reimposed price controls in June 1973. The price controls became unpopular with the public and businesspeople, who saw powerful labor unions as preferable to the price board bureaucracy. The controls produced food shortages, as meat disappeared from grocery stores and farmers drowned chickens rather than sell them at a loss. Despite the failure to control inflation, controls were slowly ended, and on April 30, 1974, their statutory authorization lapsed.

==== Governmental initiatives and organization ====
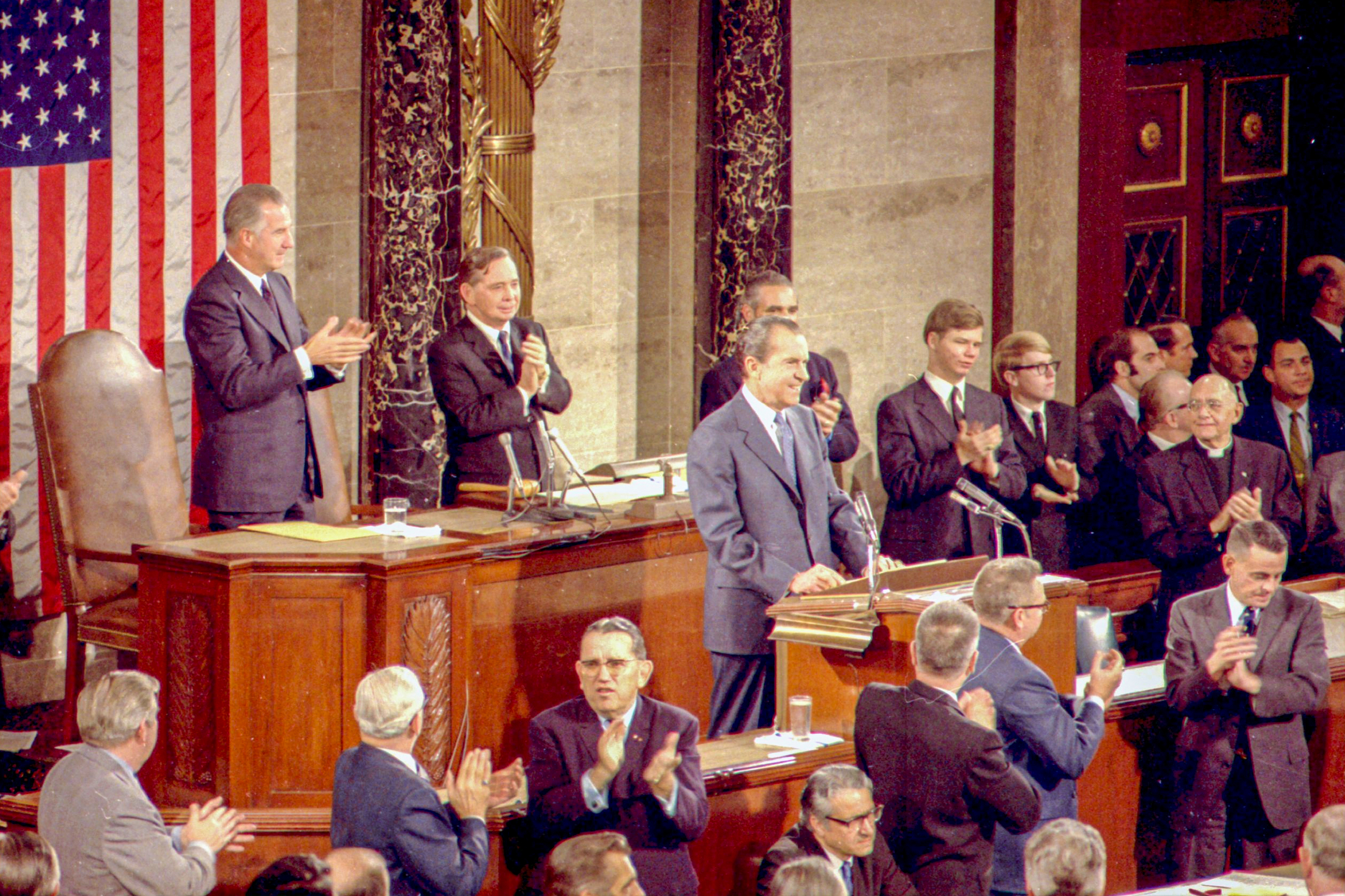
Nixon gives the 1971 State of the Union Address

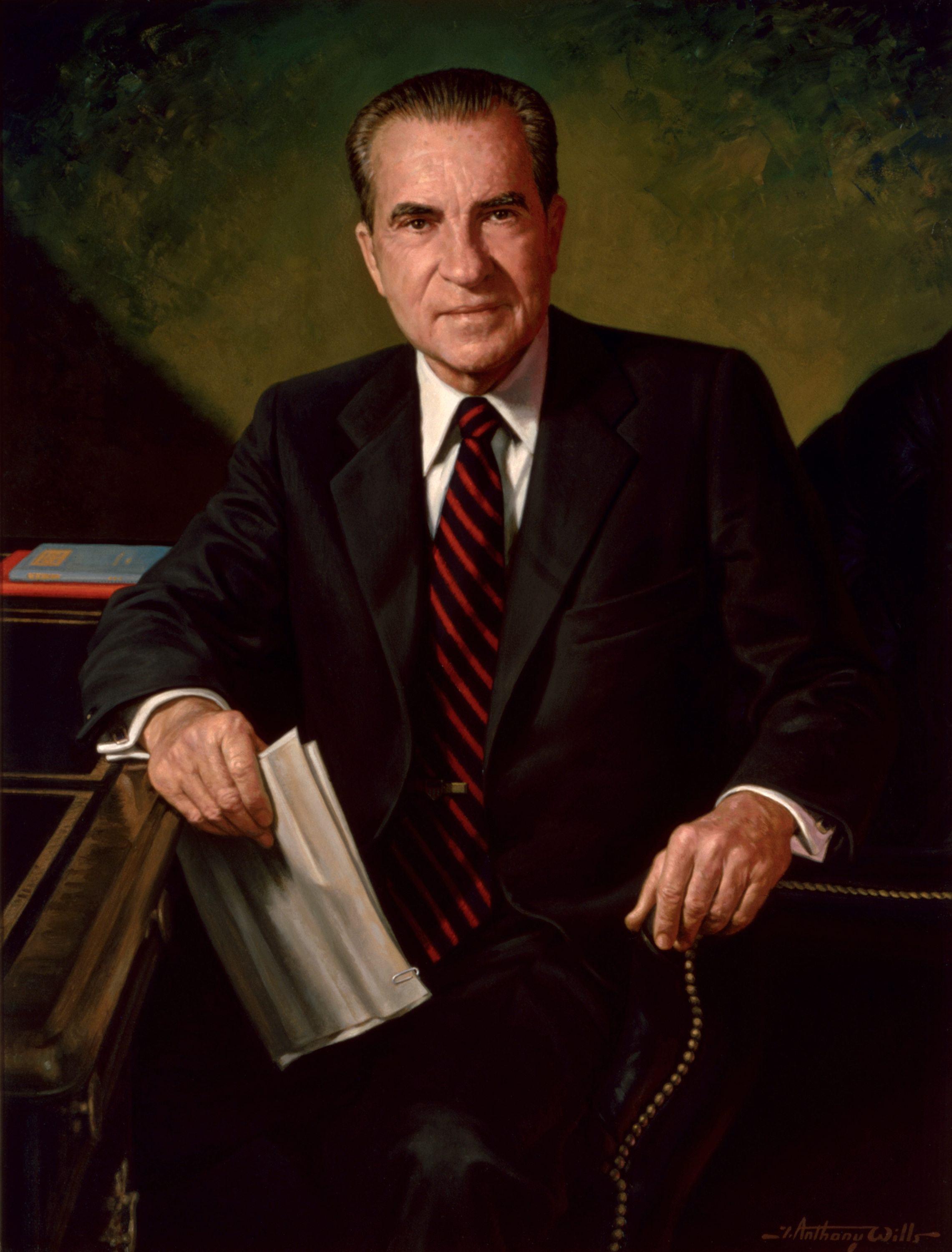
Official Nixon portrait by James Anthony Wills, c. 1984

Nixon advocated a "New Federalism", which would devolve power to state and local elected officials, though Congress was hostile to these ideas and enacted few of them. He eliminated the Cabinet-level United States Post Office Department, which in 1971 became the government-run United States Postal Service.

Nixon was a late supporter of the conservation movement. Environmental policy had not been a significant issue in the 1968 election, and the candidates were rarely asked for their views on the subject. Nixon broke new ground by discussing environmental policy in his State of the Union speech in 1970. He saw that the first Earth Day in April 1970 presaged a wave of voter interest on the subject, and sought to use that to his benefit; in June he announced the formation of the Environmental Protection Agency (EPA). He relied on his domestic advisor John Ehrlichman, who favored protection of natural resources, to keep him "out of trouble on environmental issues." Other initiatives supported by Nixon included the Clean Air Act of 1970, the Occupational Safety and Health Administration (OSHA), and the National Environmental Policy Act which required environmental impact statements for many federal projects. Nixon vetoed the Clean Water Act of 1972—objecting not to the policy goals of the legislation but to the amount of money to be spent on them, which he deemed excessive. After Congress overrode his veto, Nixon impounded the funds he deemed unjustifiable.

In 1971, Nixon proposed health insurance reform—a private health insurance employer mandate, (Note: Voluntary for employees) federalization of Medicaid for poor families with dependent minor children, and support for health maintenance organizations (HMOs). A limited HMO bill was enacted in 1973. In 1974, Nixon proposed more comprehensive health insurance reform—a private health insurance employer mandate and replacement of Medicaid by state-run health insurance plans available to all, with income-based premiums and cost sharing.

Nixon was concerned about the prevalence of domestic drug use in addition to drug use among American soldiers in Vietnam. He called for a war on drugs and pledged to cut off sources of supply abroad. He also increased funds for education and for rehabilitation facilities.

As one policy initiative, Nixon called for more money for sickle-cell research, treatment, and education in February 1971 and signed the National Sickle Cell Anemia Control Act on May 16, 1972. (Note: See especially page 2 (after introductory material) in which a bar graph displays NHLBI funding for sickle cell research from FY 1972 through FY 2001, totaling $923 million for these thirty years, starting at $10 million for 1972, then about $15 million a year through 1976, about $20 million for 1977, etc.) While Nixon called for increased spending on such high-profile items as sickle-cell disease and for a war on cancer, at the same time he sought to reduce overall spending at the National Institutes of Health.

==== Civil rights ====
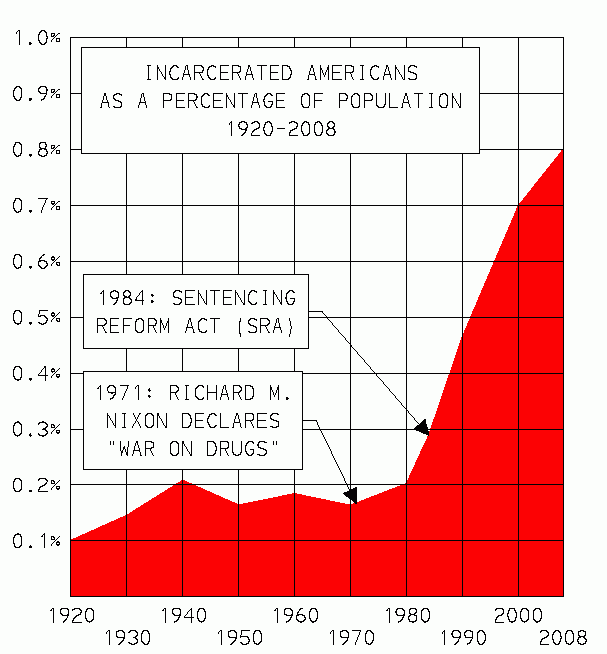
Graph of increases in U.S. incarceration rate

The Nixon presidency witnessed the first large-scale integration of public schools in the South. Nixon sought a middle way between the segregationist Wallace and liberal Democrats, whose support of integration was alienating some Southern whites. Hopeful of doing well in the South in 1972, he sought to dispose of desegregation as a political issue before then. Soon after his inauguration, he appointed Vice President Agnew to lead a task force, which worked with local leaders—both white and black—to determine how to integrate local schools. Agnew had little interest in the work, and most of it was done by Labor Secretary George Shultz. Federal aid was available, and a meeting with President Nixon was a possible reward for compliant committees. By September 1970, less than ten percent of black children were attending segregated schools. By 1971, however, tensions over desegregation surfaced in Northern cities, with angry protests over the busing of children to schools outside their neighborhood to achieve racial balance. Nixon opposed busing personally but enforced court orders requiring its use.

Some scholars, such as James Morton Turner and John Isenberg, believe that Nixon, who had advocated for civil rights in his 1960 campaign, slowed down desegregation as president, appealing to the racial conservatism of Southern whites, who were angered by the civil rights movement. This, he hoped, would boost his election chances in 1972.

In addition to desegregating public schools, Nixon implemented the Philadelphia Plan in 1970—the first significant federal affirmative action program. He also endorsed the Equal Rights Amendment after it passed both houses of Congress in 1972 and went to the states for ratification. He also pushed for African American civil rights and economic equity through a concept known as black capitalism. Nixon had campaigned as an ERA supporter in 1968, though feminists criticized him for doing little to help the ERA or their cause after his election. Nevertheless, he appointed more women to administration positions than Lyndon Johnson had.

=== Space policy ===
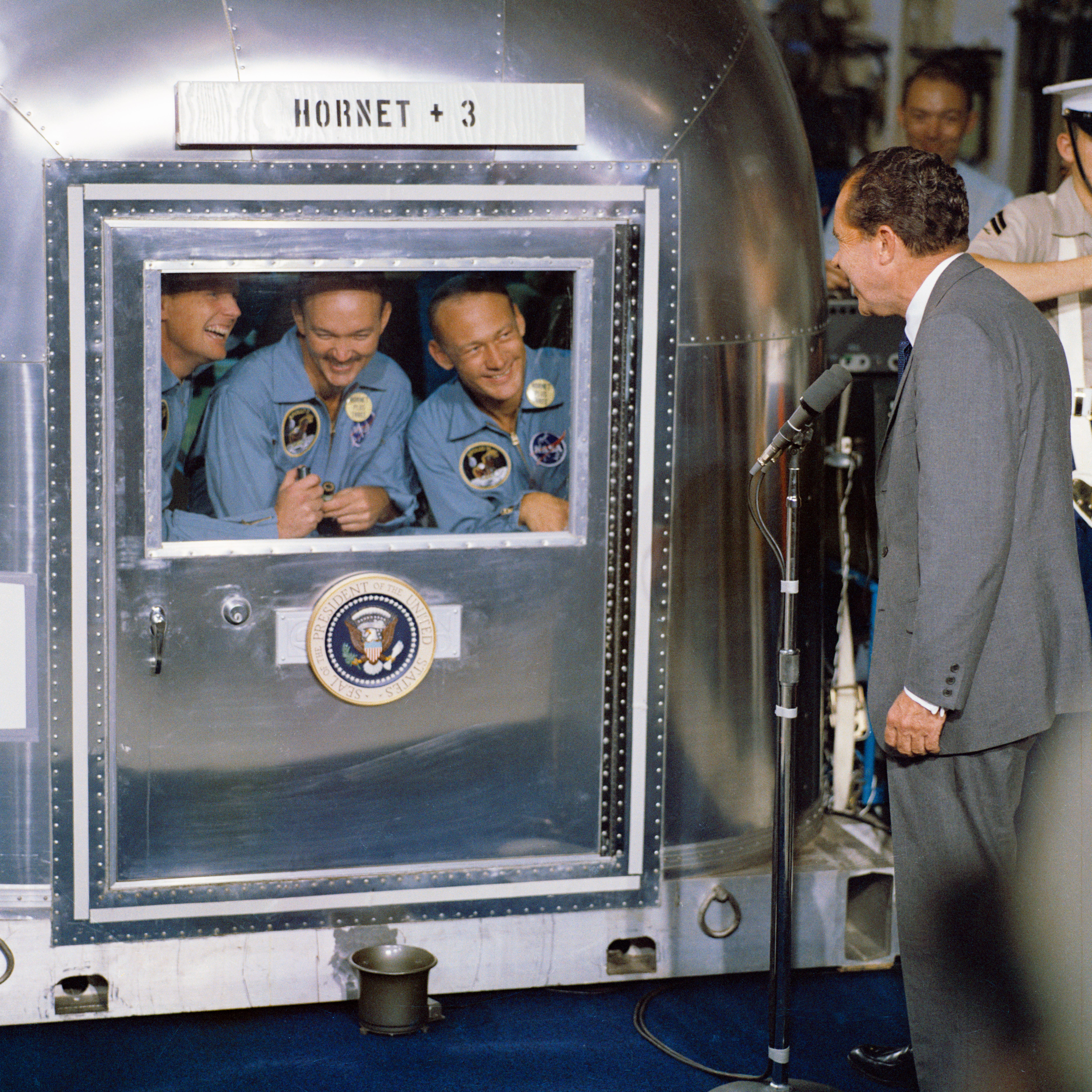
Nixon visiting the Apollo 11 astronauts in quarantine aboard the aircraft carrier USS Hornet

After a nearly decade-long national effort, the United States won the race to land astronauts on the Moon on July 20, 1969, with the flight of Apollo 11. Nixon spoke with Neil Armstrong and Buzz Aldrin during their moonwalk. He called the conversation "the most historic phone call ever made from the White House".

Nixon was unwilling to keep funding for the National Aeronautics and Space Administration (NASA) at the high level seen during the 1960s as NASA prepared to send men to the Moon. NASA Administrator Thomas O. Paine drew up ambitious plans for the establishment of a permanent base on the Moon by the end of the 1970s and the launch of a crewed expedition to Mars as early as 1981. Nixon rejected both proposals due to the expense. Nixon also canceled the Air Force Manned Orbital Laboratory program in 1969, because uncrewed spy satellites were a more cost-effective way to achieve the same reconnaissance objective. NASA cancelled the last three planned Apollo lunar missions to place Skylab in orbit more efficiently and free money up for the design and construction of the Space Shuttle.

On May 24, 1972, Nixon approved a five-year cooperative program between NASA and the Soviet space program, culminating in the 1975 joint mission of an American Apollo and Soviet Soyuz spacecraft linking in space.

=== Reelection, Watergate scandal, and resignation ===
==== 1972 presidential campaign ====
Results of the 1972 presidential election. Nixon won 520 electoral college votes (60.7% of the popular vote) to George McGovern's 17.

Nixon believed his rise to power had peaked at a moment of political realignment. The Democratic "Solid South" had long been a source of frustration to Republican ambitions. Goldwater had won several Southern states by opposing the Civil Rights Act of 1964 but had alienated more moderate Southerners. Nixon's efforts to gain Southern support in 1968 were diluted by Wallace's candidacy. Through his first term, he pursued a Southern Strategy with policies, such as his desegregation plans, that would be broadly acceptable among Southern whites, encouraging them to realign with the Republicans in the aftermath of the civil rights movement. He nominated two Southern conservatives, Clement Haynsworth and G. Harrold Carswell, to the Supreme Court, but neither was confirmed by the Senate.

Nixon entered his name on the New Hampshire primary ballot on January 5, 1972, effectively announcing his candidacy for reelection. Virtually assured the Republican nomination, the President had initially expected his Democratic opponent to be Massachusetts senator Ted Kennedy (brother of the late president), who was largely removed from contention after the July 1969 Chappaquiddick incident. Instead, Maine senator Edmund Muskie became the front runner, with South Dakota senator George McGovern in a close second place.

On June 10, McGovern won the California primary and secured the Democratic nomination. The following month, Nixon was renominated at the 1972 Republican National Convention. He dismissed the Democratic platform as cowardly and divisive. McGovern intended to sharply reduce defense spending and supported amnesty for draft evaders as well as abortion rights. With some of his supporters believed to be in favor of drug legalization, McGovern was perceived as standing for "amnesty, abortion and acid". McGovern was also damaged by his vacillating support for his original running mate, Missouri senator Thomas Eagleton, dumped from the ticket following revelations that he had received electroshock treatment for depression. Nixon was ahead in most polls for the entire election cycle, and was reelected on November 7, 1972, in one of the largest landslide election victories in American history. He defeated McGovern with over 60 percent of the popular vote, losing only in Massachusetts and D.C.

==== Watergate ====
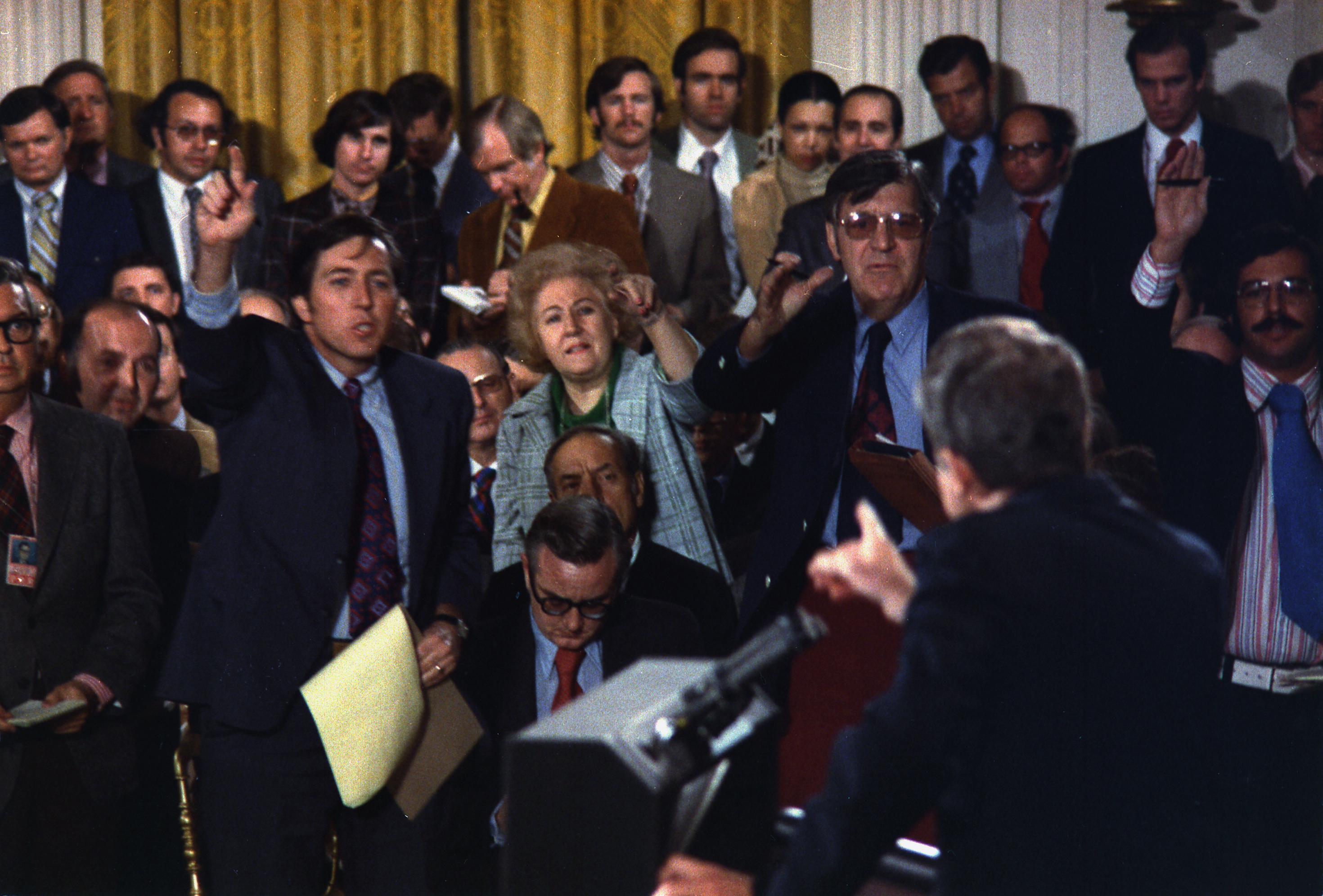
Nixon takes questions at 1973 press conference

The term Watergate has come to encompass an array of clandestine and often illegal activities undertaken by members of the Nixon administration. Those activities included "dirty tricks", such as bugging the offices of political opponents, and the harassment of activist groups and political figures. The activities were brought to light after five men were caught breaking into the Democratic Party headquarters at the Watergate complex in Washington, D.C., on June 17, 1972. The Washington Post picked up on the story; reporters Carl Bernstein and Bob Woodward relied on an informant known as "Deep Throat"—later revealed to be Mark Felt, associate director at the FBI—to link the men to the Nixon administration. Nixon downplayed the scandal as mere politics, calling news articles biased and misleading. A series of revelations made it clear that the Committee to Re-elect President Nixon, and later the White House, were involved in attempts to sabotage the Democrats. Senior aides such as White House Counsel John Dean faced prosecution; in total 48 officials were convicted of wrongdoing.

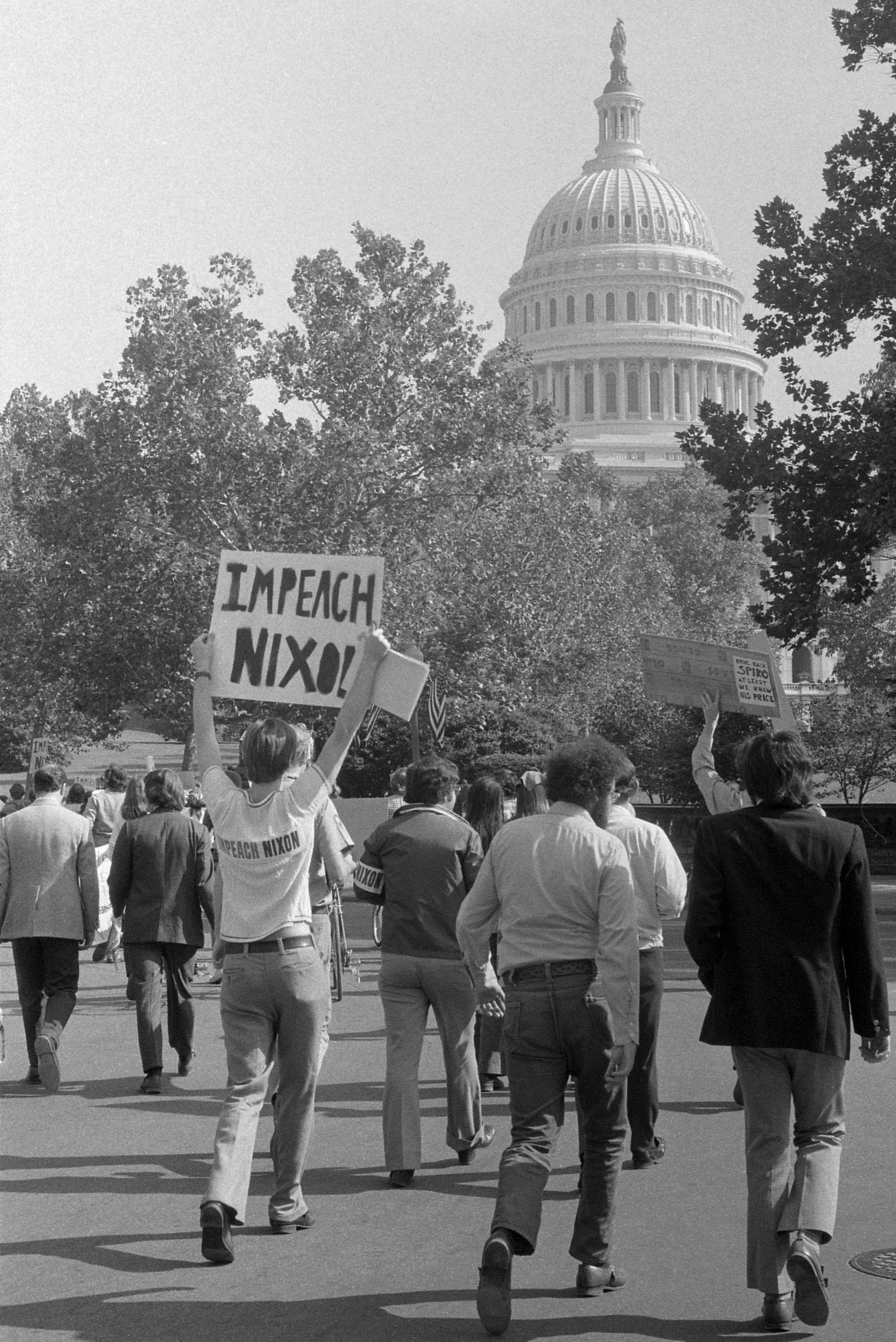
Demonstrator demands impeachment, October 1973

On November 17, 1973, President Nixon held a press conference at Disney's Contemporary Resort and famously said "I'm not a crook"

In July 1973, White House aide Alexander Butterfield testified under oath to Congress that Nixon had a secret taping system and recorded his conversations and phone calls in the Oval Office. These tapes were subpoenaed by Watergate Special Counsel Archibald Cox; Nixon provided transcripts of the conversations but not the actual tapes, citing executive privilege. With the White House and Cox at loggerheads, Nixon had Cox fired in October in the "Saturday Night Massacre"; he was replaced by Leon Jaworski. In November, Nixon's lawyers revealed that a tape of conversations held in the White House on June 20, 1972, had an 18 1/2 minute gap. Rose Mary Woods, the President's personal secretary, claimed responsibility for the gap, saying that she had accidentally wiped the section while transcribing the tape, but her story was widely mocked. The gap, while not conclusive proof of wrongdoing by the President, cast doubt on Nixon's statement that he had been unaware of the cover-up.

Though Nixon lost much popular support, even from his own party, he rejected accusations of wrongdoing and vowed to stay in office. He admitted he had made mistakes but insisted he had no prior knowledge of the burglary, did not break any laws, and did not learn of the cover-up until early 1973. On October 10, 1973, Vice President Agnew resigned for reasons unrelated to Watergate: he was convicted on charges of bribery, tax evasion, and money laundering during his tenure as governor of Maryland. Believing his first choice, John Connally, would not be confirmed by Congress, Nixon chose Gerald Ford, Minority Leader of the House of Representatives, to replace Agnew. One researcher suggests Nixon effectively disengaged from his own administration after Ford was sworn in as vice president on December 6, 1973.

On November 17, 1973, during a televised question-and-answer session with 400 Associated Press managing editors, Nixon said, "People have got to know whether or not their president is a crook. Well, I'm not a crook. I've earned everything I've got."

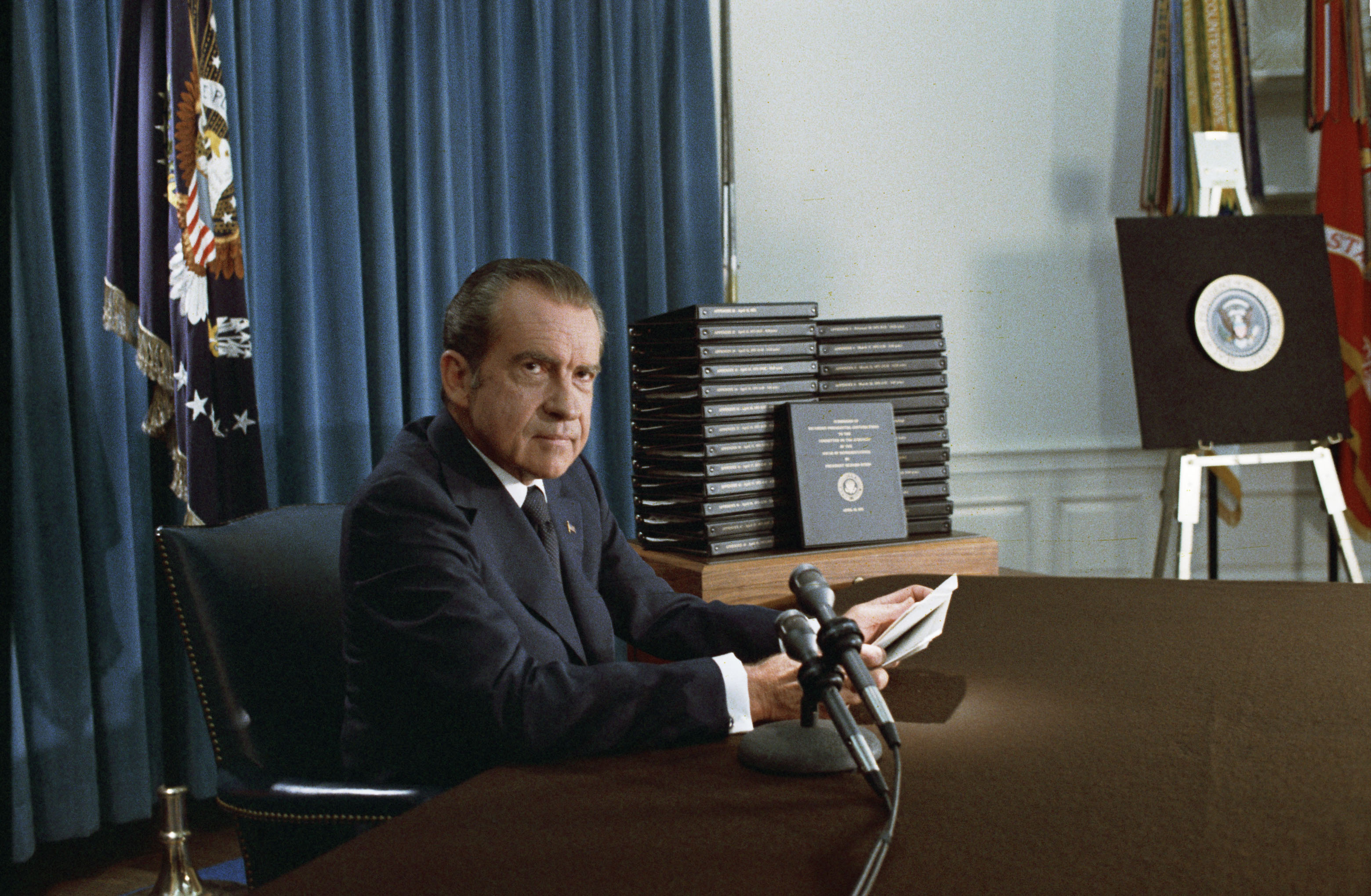
Nixon announces the release of edited transcripts of the Watergate tapes, April 29, 1974

The legal battle over the tapes continued through early 1974, and in April, Nixon announced the release of 1,200 pages of transcripts of White House conversations between himself and his aides. The House Judiciary Committee opened impeachment hearings against the President on May 9, 1974, which were televised on the major TV networks. These hearings culminated in votes for impeachment. On July 24, the Supreme Court ruled unanimously that the full tapes, not just selected transcripts, must be released.

The scandal grew to involve a slew of additional allegations against the President, ranging from the improper use of government agencies to accepting gifts in office and his personal finances and taxes; Nixon repeatedly stated his willingness to pay any outstanding taxes due, and later paid $465,000 (equivalent to $3 million in 2025) in back taxes in 1974.

Nixon Oval Office meeting with H. R. Haldeman: the "Smoking Gun" Conversation, June 23, 1972 (Full Transcript)

Even with support diminished by the continuing series of revelations, Nixon hoped to fight the charges. But one of the new tapes, recorded soon after the break-in, demonstrated that Nixon had been told of the White House connection to the Watergate burglaries soon after they took place, and had approved plans to thwart the investigation. In a statement accompanying the release of what became known as the "Smoking Gun Tape" on August 5, 1974, Nixon accepted blame for misleading the country about when he had been told of White House involvement, stating that he had had a lapse of memory. Senate Minority Leader Hugh Scott, Senator Barry Goldwater, and House Minority Leader John Jacob Rhodes met with Nixon soon after. Rhodes told Nixon he faced certain impeachment in the House. Scott and Goldwater told the president that he had, at most, only 15 votes in his favor in the Senate, far fewer than the 34 needed to avoid removal from office.

==== Resignation ====
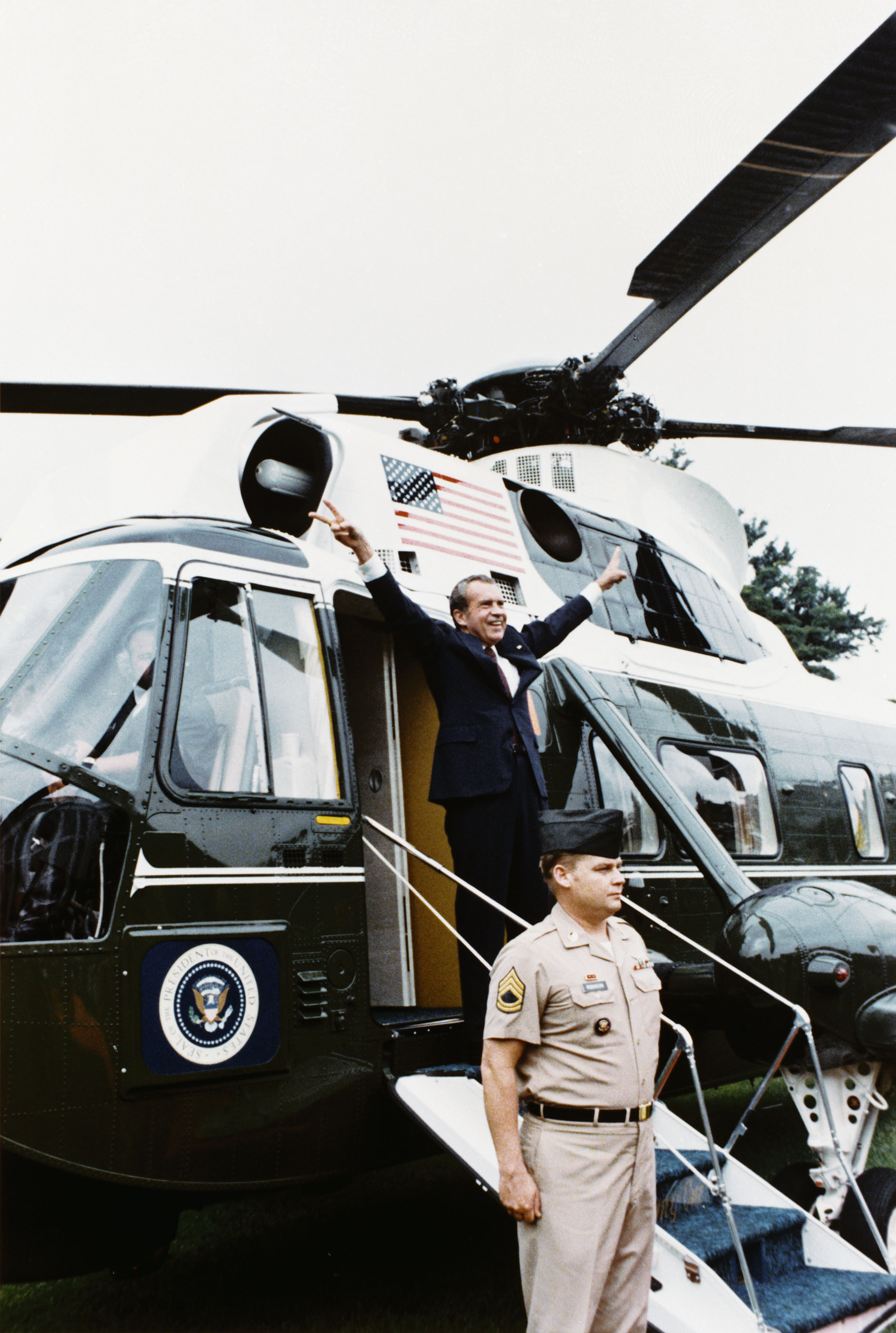
Nixon leaving the White House on Marine One shortly before his resignation became effective on August 9, 1974

President Nixon's resignation speech

On August 8, 1974, facing a loss of political support and it being increasingly certain that he would be impeached and removed from office, Nixon addressed the nation on television, announcing that he would resign the presidency the following day, on August 9. His resignation speech was delivered from the Oval Office and was carried live on radio and television. Nixon said he was resigning for the good of the country and asked the nation to support the new president, Gerald Ford. Nixon went on to review the accomplishments of his presidency, especially in foreign policy. In defending his presidency, Nixon quoted "Citizenship in a Republic", a 1910 speech by Theodore Roosevelt:

Sometimes I have succeeded and sometimes I have failed, but always I have taken heart from what Theodore Roosevelt once said about the man in the arena, "whose face is marred by dust and sweat and blood, who strives valiantly, who errs and comes up short again and again because there is not effort without error and shortcoming, but who does actually strive to do the deed, who knows the great enthusiasms, the great devotions, who spends himself in a worthy cause, who at the best knows in the end the triumphs of high achievements and who at the worst, if he fails, at least fails while daring greatly".

Nixon's speech received generally favorable initial responses from network commentators, with only Roger Mudd of CBS News criticizing it for failing to admit wrongdoing. Conrad Black, a Nixon biographer, labeled the resignation speech "a masterpiece", saying, "What was intended to be an unprecedented humiliation for any American president, Nixon converted into a virtual parliamentary acknowledgement of almost blameless insufficiency of legislative support to continue. He left while devoting half his address to a recitation of his accomplishments in office."

== Post-presidency (1974–1994) ==
=== Pardon and illness ===
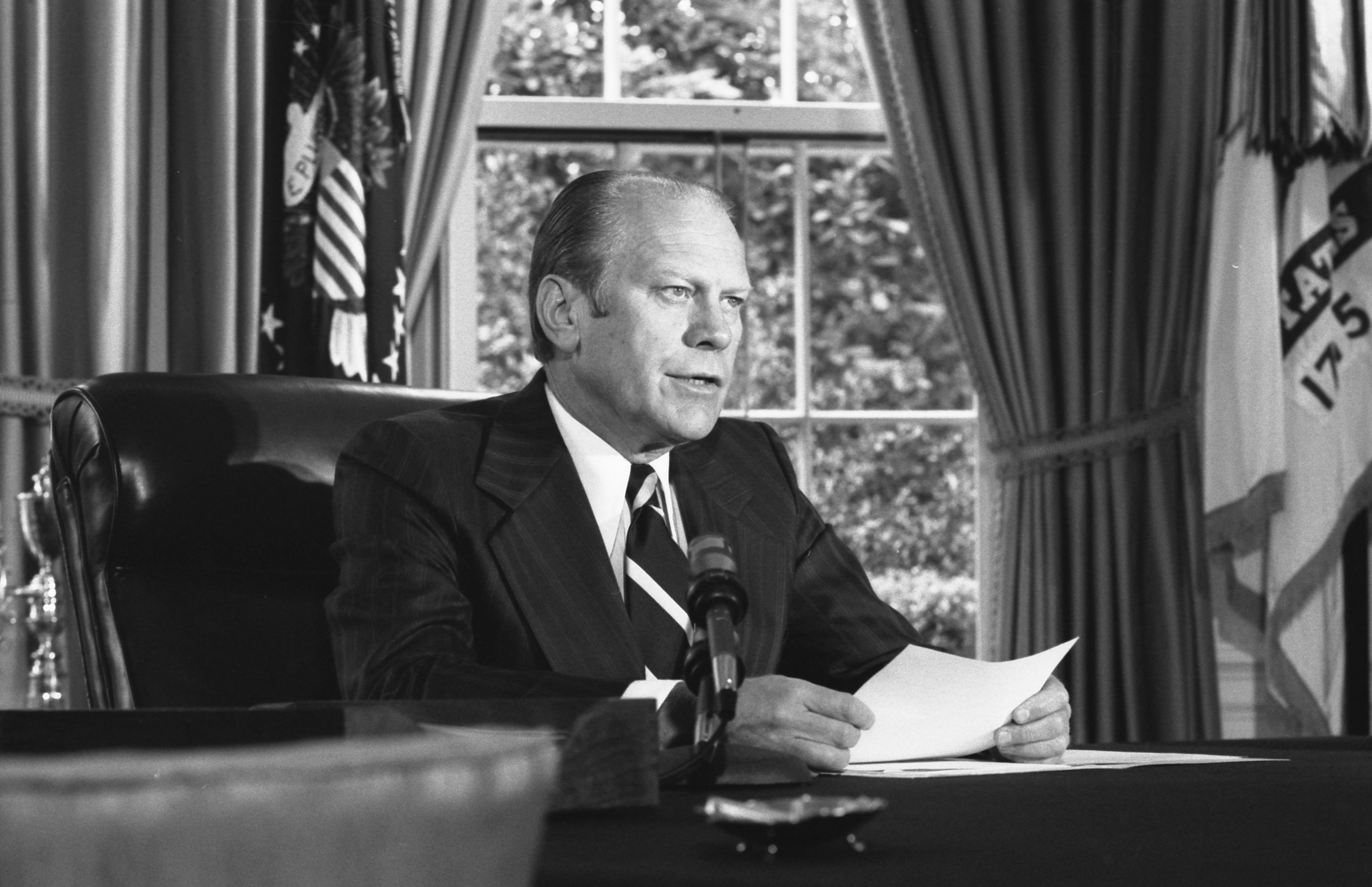
President Ford announcing his decision to pardon Nixon, September 8, 1974, in the Oval Office

Following his resignation, the Nixons flew to their home La Casa Pacifica in San Clemente, California. According to his biographer, Jonathan Aitken, "Nixon was a soul in torment" after his resignation. Congress had funded Nixon's transition costs, including some salary expenses, though reducing the appropriation from $850,000 to $200,000. With some of his staff still with him, Nixon was at his desk by 7:00 a.m. with little to do. His former press secretary, Ron Ziegler, sat with him alone for hours each day.

Nixon's resignation had not put an end to the desire among many to see him punished. The Ford White House considered a pardon of Nixon, even though it would be unpopular in the country. Nixon, contacted by Ford emissaries, was initially reluctant to accept the pardon, but then agreed to do so. Ford insisted on a statement of contrition, but Nixon felt he had not committed any crimes and should not have to issue such a document. Ford eventually agreed and, on September 8, 1974, he granted Nixon a "full, free, and absolute pardon", which ended any possibility of an indictment. Nixon then released a statement:

I was wrong in not acting more decisively and more forthrightly in dealing with Watergate, particularly when it reached the stage of judicial proceedings and grew from a political scandal into a national tragedy. No words can describe the depth of my regret and pain at the anguish my mistakes over Watergate have caused the nation and the presidency, a nation I so deeply love, and an institution I so greatly respect.

In October 1974, Nixon fell ill with phlebitis. Told by his doctors that he could either be operated on or die, a reluctant Nixon chose surgery, and President Ford visited him in the hospital. Nixon was under subpoena for the trial of three of his former aides—Dean, Haldeman, and John Ehrlichman—and The Washington Post, disbelieving his illness, printed a cartoon showing Nixon with a cast on the "wrong foot". Judge John Sirica excused Nixon's presence despite the defendants' objections. Congress instructed Ford to retain Nixon's presidential papers—beginning a three-decade legal battle over the documents that was eventually won by the former president and his estate. Nixon was in the hospital when the 1974 midterm elections were held, and Watergate and the pardon were contributing factors to the Republican loss of 49 seats in the House and four in the Senate.

=== Return to public life ===
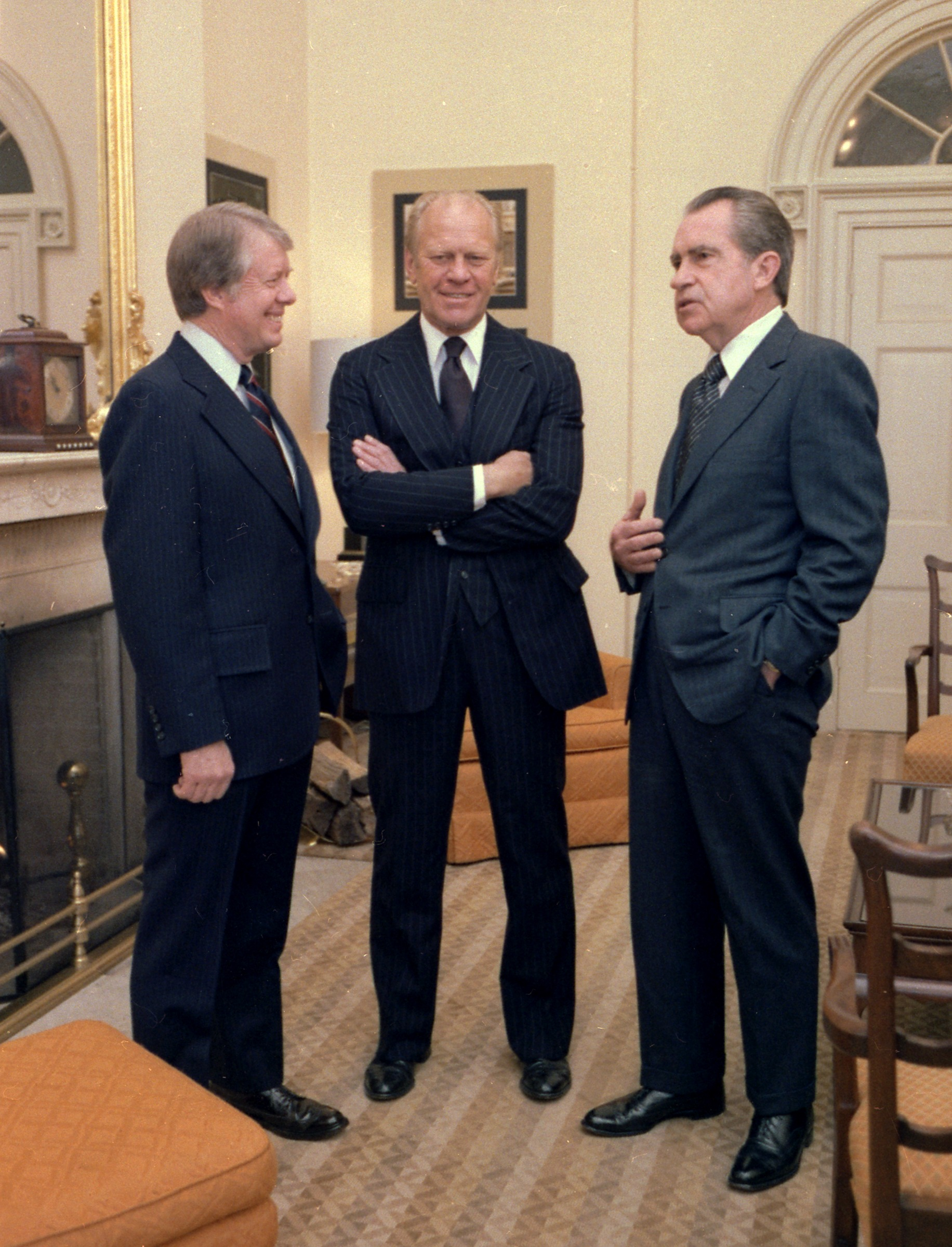
President Jimmy Carter and ex-presidents Gerald Ford and Nixon meet at the White House before former vice president Hubert Humphrey's funeral, 1978

In December 1974, Nixon began planning his comeback despite the considerable ill will against him in the country. He wrote in his diary, referring to himself and Pat,

So be it. We will see it through. We've had tough times before, and we can take the tougher ones that we will have to go through now. That is perhaps what we were made for—to be able to take punishment beyond what anyone in this office has had before, particularly after leaving office. This is a test of character, and we must not fail the test.

By early 1975, Nixon's health was improving. He maintained an office in a Coast Guard station 300 yards (270 m) from his home, at first taking a golf cart and later walking the route each day; he mainly worked on his memoirs. He had hoped to wait before writing his memoirs; the fact that his assets were being eaten away by expenses and lawyer fees compelled him to begin work quickly. He was handicapped in this work by the end of his transition allowance in February, which compelled him to part with many of his staff, including Ziegler. In August of that year, he met with British talk-show host and producer David Frost, who paid him $600,000 (equivalent to $3.6 million in 2025) for a series of sit-down interviews, filmed and aired in 1977. They began on the topic of foreign policy, recounting the leaders he had known, but the most remembered section of the interviews was that on Watergate. Nixon admitted he had "let down the country" and that "I brought myself down. I gave them a sword, and they stuck it in. And they twisted it with relish. And, I guess, if I'd been in their position, I'd have done the same thing." The interviews garnered 45–50 million viewers, becoming the most-watched program of its kind in television history.

The interviews helped improve Nixon's financial position—at one point in early 1975, he had had only $500 in the bank—as did the sale of his Key Biscayne property to a trust set up by wealthy friends of Nixon, such as Bebe Rebozo. In February 1976, Nixon visited China at the personal invitation of Mao. Nixon had wanted to return to China but chose to wait until after Ford's own visit in 1975. Nixon remained neutral in the close 1976 primary battle between Ford and Reagan. Ford won, but was defeated by Georgia governor Jimmy Carter in the general election. The Carter administration had little use for Nixon and blocked his planned trip to Australia, causing the government of Prime Minister Malcolm Fraser to withhold its official invitation.

In 1976, Nixon was disbarred by a New York State court for obstruction of justice in the Watergate affair. He chose not to present any defense. In early 1978, he visited the United Kingdom; there, he was shunned by American diplomats, most ministers of the James Callaghan government, and two former prime ministers, Harold Macmillan and Edward Heath. He was welcomed, however, by the Leader of the Opposition, Margaret Thatcher, and former prime ministers Lord Home and Sir Harold Wilson. Nixon addressed the Oxford Union regarding Watergate:

[Some people] felt that, on this matter that I had not handled it properly, and they were right. I screwed it up, and I paid the price.

=== Author and elder statesman ===
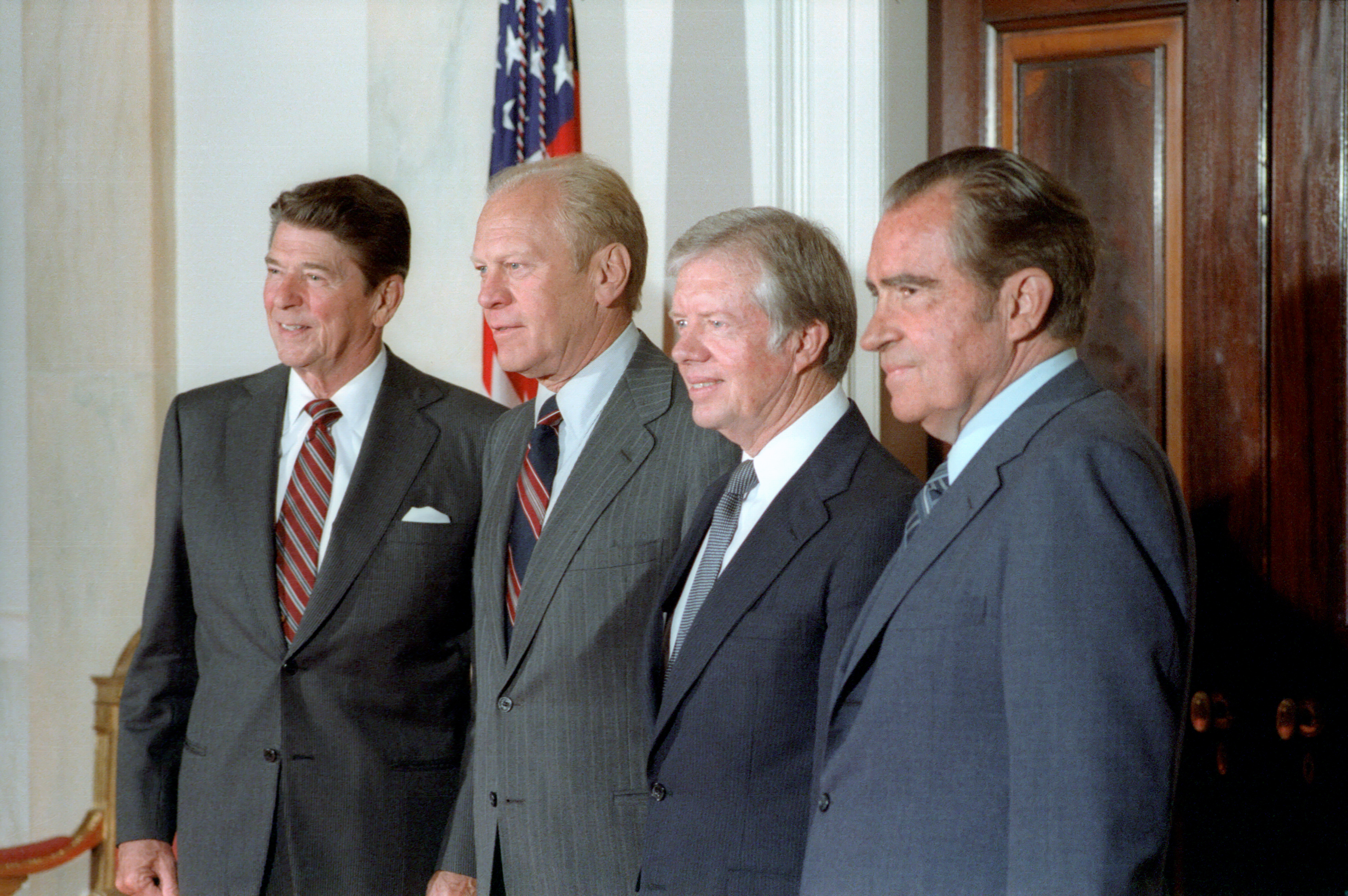
President Ronald Reagan meets with his three immediate predecessors, Gerald Ford, Jimmy Carter and Nixon, at the White House, October 1981; the three former presidents would represent the United States at the funeral of Egyptian president Anwar Sadat.

In 1978, Nixon published his memoirs, RN: The Memoirs of Richard Nixon, the first of nine books he was to author in his retirement. John A. Farrell deemed it one of the better presidential memoirs, candid and capturing its author's voice; he deemed its rise up the bestseller lists justified. Nixon visited the White House in 1979, invited by Carter for the state dinner for Chinese Vice Premier Deng Xiaoping. Carter had not wanted to invite Nixon, but Deng had said he would visit Nixon in California if the former president was not invited. Nixon had a private meeting with Deng and visited Beijing again in mid-1979.

On August 10, 1979, the Nixons purchased a 12‐room condominium occupying the seventh floor of 817 Fifth Avenue New York City after being rejected by two Manhattan co-ops. When the deposed Shah of Iran died in Egypt in July 1980, Nixon defied the State Department, which intended to send no U.S. representative, by attending the funeral. Though Nixon had no official credentials, as a former president, he was seen as the American presence at its former ally's funeral. Nixon supported Ronald Reagan for president in 1980, making television appearances portraying himself as, in biographer Stephen Ambrose's words, "the senior statesman above the fray". He wrote guest articles for many publications both during the campaign and after Reagan's victory. After 18 months in the New York City townhouse, Nixon and his wife moved in 1981 to Saddle River, New Jersey.

Throughout the 1980s, Nixon maintained an ambitious schedule of speaking engagements and writing, traveled, and met with many foreign leaders, especially those of Third World countries. He joined former presidents Ford and Carter as representatives of the United States at the funeral of Egyptian president Anwar Sadat. On a trip to the Middle East, Nixon made his views known regarding Saudi Arabia and Libya, which attracted significant U.S. media attention; The Washington Post ran stories on Nixon's "rehabilitation". Nixon visited the Soviet Union in 1986 and on his return sent President Reagan a lengthy memorandum containing foreign policy suggestions and his personal impressions of Soviet general secretary Mikhail Gorbachev. Following this trip, Nixon was ranked in a Gallup poll as one of the ten most admired men in the world.

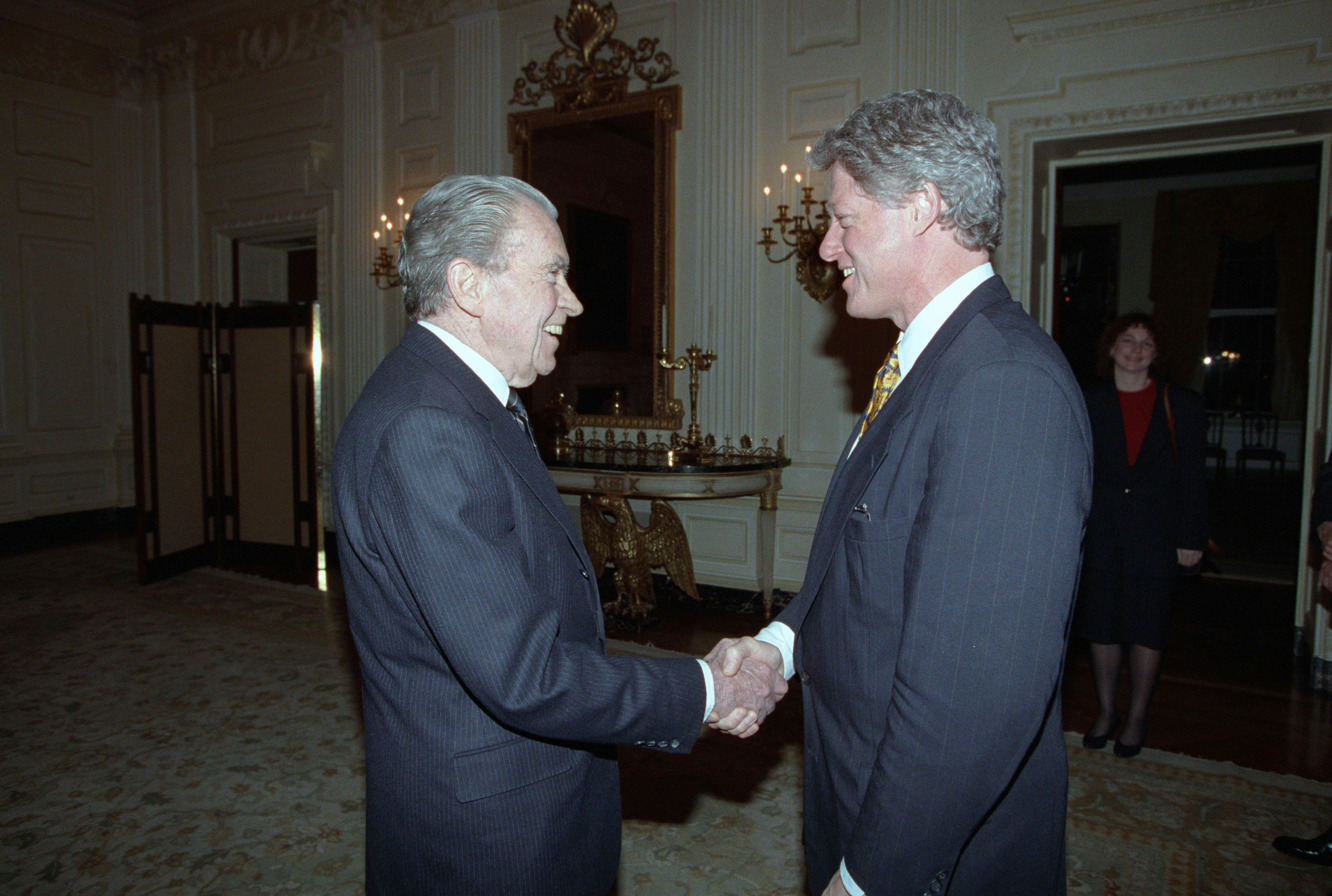
Nixon with President Bill Clinton in the residence of the White House, March 1993

In 1986, Nixon addressed a convention of newspaper publishers, impressing his audience with his tour d'horizon of the world. At the time, political pundit Elizabeth Drew wrote, "Even when he was wrong, Nixon still showed that he knew a great deal and had a capacious memory, as well as the capacity to speak with apparent authority, enough to impress people who had little regard for him in earlier times." Newsweek ran a story on "Nixon's comeback" with the headline "He's back".

On July 19, 1990, the Richard Nixon Library and Birthplace in Yorba Linda, California opened as a private institution with the Nixons in attendance. They were joined by a large crowd of people, including Presidents Ford, Reagan, and George H. W. Bush, as well as their wives, Betty, Nancy, and Barbara. In January 1994, the former president founded the Nixon Center (today the Center for the National Interest), a Washington policy think tank and conference center.

During the early 1990s, Nixon focused much of his energy and time on the end of the Cold War. In three of the last four books that he published and in dozens of articles, Nixon urged American leaders to support Russia's transition from communism to a market economy. After Bill Clinton took office as president, he sought Nixon's advice on the post-Soviet states. Nixon met Russian president Boris Yeltsin and Ukrainian president Leonid Kravchuk.

Pat Nixon died on June 22, 1993, of emphysema and lung cancer. Her funeral services were held on the grounds of the Richard Nixon Library and Birthplace. Former president Nixon was distraught throughout the interment and delivered a tribute to her inside the library building.

== Death and funeral ==
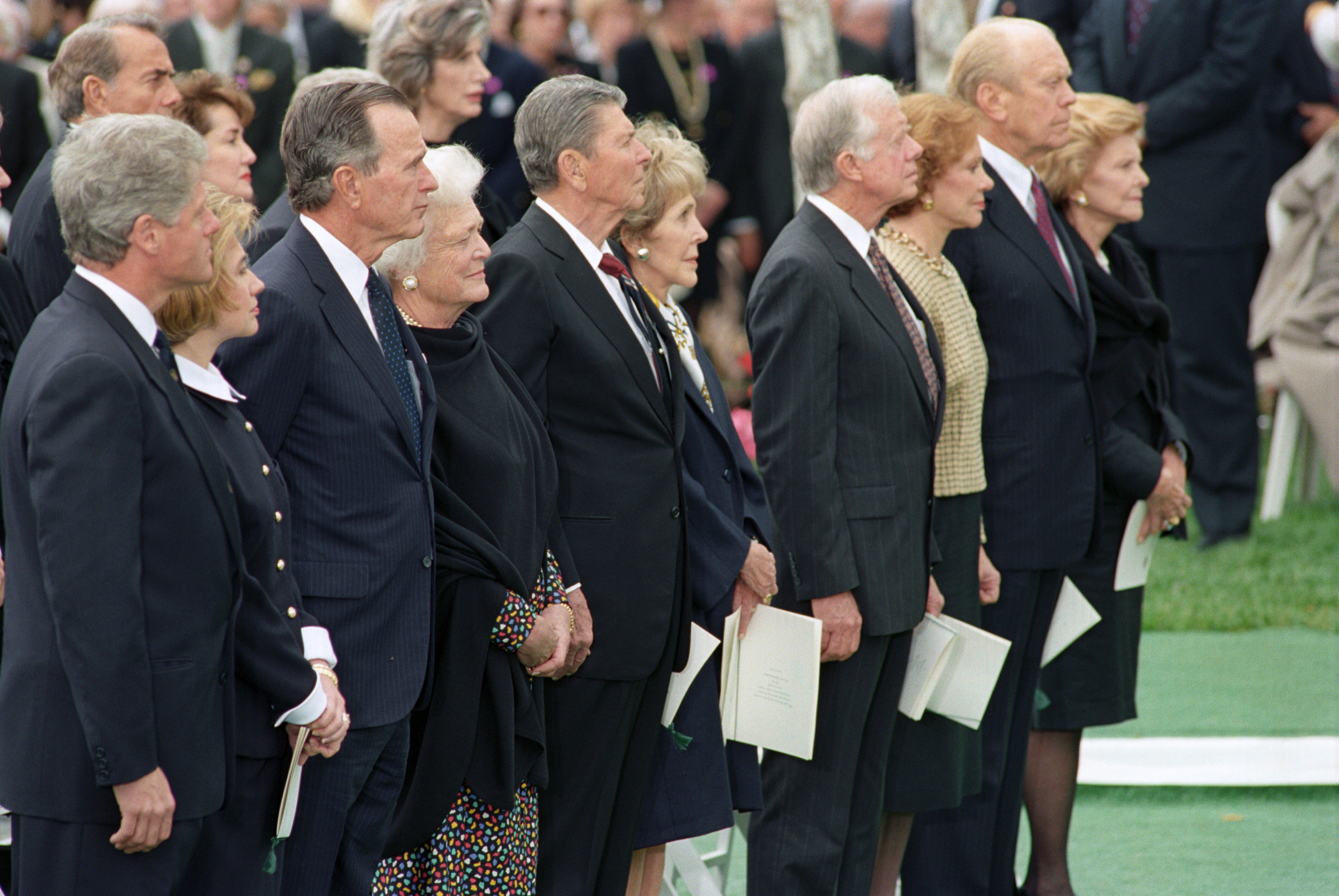
Five U.S. presidents (then-incumbent president Bill Clinton, George H. W. Bush, Ronald Reagan, Jimmy Carter, and Gerald Ford) and their wives attending Nixon's funeral, April 27, 1994

Nixon suffered a severe stroke on April 18, 1994, while preparing to eat dinner in his home at Park Ridge, New Jersey. A blood clot resulting from the atrial fibrillation he had suffered for many years had formed in his upper heart, broken off, and traveled to his brain. He was taken to NewYork-Presbyterian Hospital in Manhattan, initially alert but unable to speak or to move his right arm or leg. Damage to the brain caused swelling (cerebral edema) and Nixon slipped into a deep coma. He died at 9:08 p.m. on April 22, 1994, with his daughters at his bedside. He was 81 years old.

Nixon's funeral took place on April 27, 1994, in Yorba Linda, California. Eulogists at the Nixon Library ceremony included President Bill Clinton, former secretary of state Henry Kissinger, Senate Minority Leader Bob Dole, California governor Pete Wilson, and the Reverend Billy Graham. Also in attendance were former presidents Ford, Carter, Reagan, George H. W. Bush, and their wives.

Richard Nixon was buried beside his wife Pat on the grounds of the Nixon Library. In keeping with his wishes, his funeral was not a full state funeral, though his body did lie in repose in the Nixon Library lobby from April 26 to the morning of the funeral service. Mourners waited in line for up to eight hours in chilly, wet weather to pay their respects. At its peak, the line to pass by Nixon's casket was three miles long with an estimated 42,000 people waiting.

John F. Stacks of Time magazine said of Nixon shortly after his death,

An outsized energy and determination drove him on to recover and rebuild after every self-created disaster that he faced. To reclaim a respected place in American public life after his resignation, he kept traveling and thinking and talking to the world's leaders ... and by the time Bill Clinton came to the White House [in 1993], Nixon had virtually cemented his role as an elder statesman. Clinton, whose wife served on the staff of the committee that voted to impeach Nixon, met openly with him and regularly sought his advice.

Tom Wicker of The New York Times noted that Nixon had been equalled only by Franklin Roosevelt in being five times nominated on a major party ticket and, quoting Nixon's 1962 farewell speech, wrote,

Richard Nixon's jowly, beard-shadowed face, the ski-jump nose and the widow's peak, the arms upstretched in the V-sign, had been so often pictured and caricatured, his presence had become such a familiar one in the land, he had been so often in the heat of controversy, that it was hard to realize the nation really would not "have Nixon to kick around anymore".

Ambrose said of the reaction to Nixon's death, "To everyone's amazement, except his, he's our beloved elder statesman."

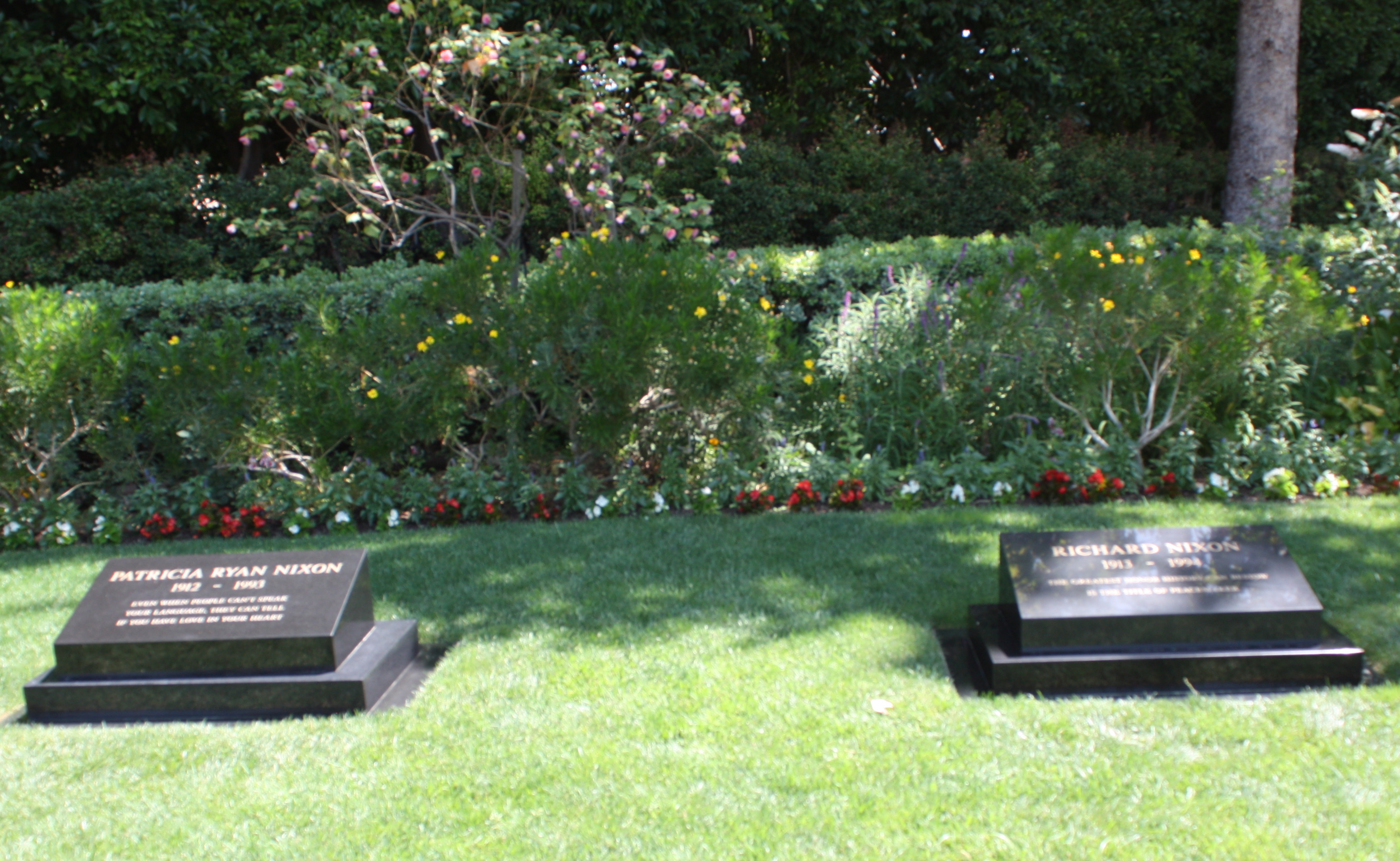
The graves of Nixon and his wife Pat

Upon Nixon's death, the news coverage mentioned Watergate and the resignation, but much of the coverage was favorable to the former president. The Dallas Morning News stated, "History ultimately should show that despite his flaws, he was one of our most farsighted chief executives." This offended some; columnist Russell Baker complained of "a group conspiracy to grant him absolution". Cartoonist Jeff Koterba of the Omaha World-Herald depicted History before a blank canvas, his subject Nixon, as America looks on eagerly. The artist urges his audience to sit down; the work will take some time to complete, as "this portrait is a little more complicated than most". Hunter S. Thompson wrote a scathing piece denouncing Nixon for Rolling Stone, entitled "He Was a Crook" (which also appeared a month later in The Atlantic). In his article, Thompson described Nixon as "a political monster straight out of Grendel and a very dangerous enemy".

== Legacy ==
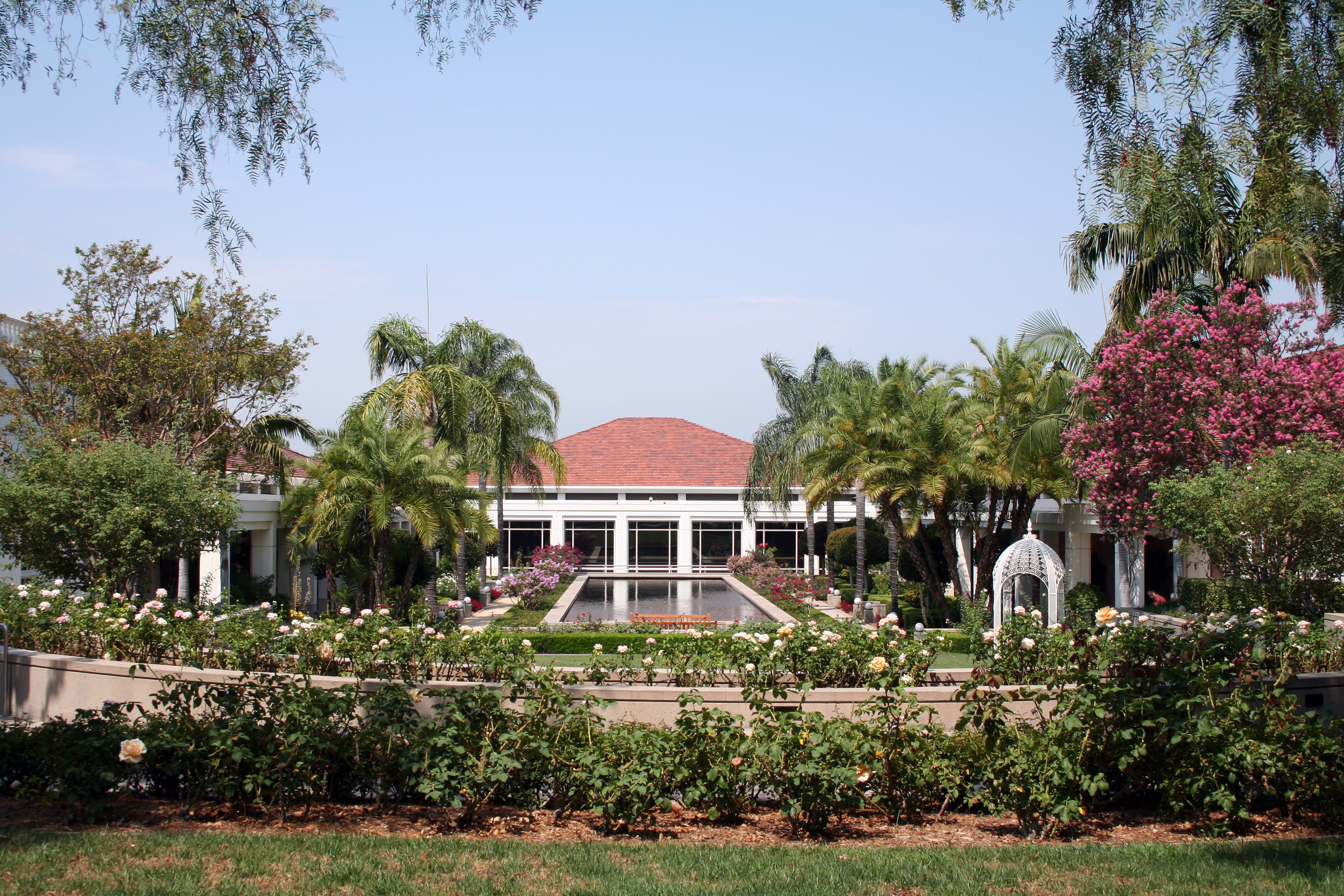
Richard Nixon's Presidential Library and Museum located in Yorba Linda, California

Historian and political scientist James MacGregor Burns asked of Nixon, "How can one evaluate such an idiosyncratic president, so brilliant and so morally lacking?" Evaluations of his presidency have proven complex, contrasting his presidency's domestic and foreign policy successes with the acrimonious circumstances of his departure. According to Ambrose, "Nixon wanted to be judged by what he accomplished. What he will be remembered for is the nightmare he put the country through in his second term and for his resignation." Irwin Gellman, who chronicled Nixon's congressional career, suggests, "He was remarkable among his congressional peers, a success story in a troubled era, one who steered a sensible anti-Communist course against the excess of McCarthy." Aitken feels that "Nixon, both as a man and as a statesman, has been excessively maligned for his faults and inadequately recognised for his virtues. Yet even in a spirit of historical revisionism, no simple verdict is possible."

Nixon saw his policies on Vietnam, China, and the Soviet Union as central to his place in history. Nixon's onetime opponent George McGovern commented in 1983, "President Nixon probably had a more practical approach to the two superpowers, China and the Soviet Union, than any other president since World War II ... With the exception of his inexcusable continuation of the war in Vietnam, Nixon really will get high marks in history." Political scientist Jussi Hanhimäki disagrees, saying that Nixon's diplomacy was merely a continuation of the Cold War policy of containment by diplomatic, rather than military, means. Historian Christopher Andrew concludes that "Nixon was a great statesman on the world stage as well as a shabby practitioner of electoral politics in the domestic arena. While the criminal farce of Watergate was in the making, Nixon's inspirational statesmanship was establishing new working relationships both with Communist China and with the Soviet Union."

Nixon's stance on domestic affairs has been credited with the passage and enforcement of environmental and regulatory legislation. In a 2011 paper on Nixon and the environment, historian Paul Charles Milazzo points to Nixon's creation of the United States Environmental Protection Agency (EPA), and to his enforcement of legislation such as the 1973 Endangered Species Act, stating that "though unsought and unacknowledged, Richard Nixon's environmental legacy is secure". Nixon himself did not consider the environmental advances he made in office an important part of his legacy; some historians contend that his choices were driven more by political expediency than any strong environmentalism. Some historians say Nixon's Southern Strategy turned the Southern United States into a Republican stronghold, while others deem economic factors more important in the change. Throughout his career, Nixon moved his party away from the control of isolationists, and as a Congressman, he was a persuasive advocate of containing Soviet communism.

Historian Keith W. Olson has written that Nixon left a legacy of fundamental mistrust of government, rooted in Vietnam and Watergate. During the impeachment of Bill Clinton in 1998, both sides tried to use Nixon and Watergate to their advantage: Republicans suggested that Clinton's misconduct was comparable to Nixon's, while Democrats contended that Nixon's actions had been far more serious than Clinton's. For a time, there was a decrease in the power of the presidency as Congress passed restrictive legislation in the wake of Watergate. Olson suggests that legislation in the aftermath of the September 11 attacks restored the president's power.

According to his biographer Herbert Parmet, "Nixon's role was to steer the Republican party along a middle course, somewhere between the competitive impulses of the Rockefellers, the Goldwaters, and the Reagans." A self-described "progressive conservative", Nixon presided over a number of activist governmental initiatives during the course of his presidency. As one speechwriter said of Nixon, "His heart was on the right, and his head was, with FDR, 'slightly left of center.'" Commenting on Nixon's progressive conservative approach to government, one historian has argued that

Nixon's progressive conservatism gave his administration's policies a distinctive cast that defied easy categorization. Nixon worked hard to find a middle ground between the hyperactivism of the growth liberals JFK and LBJ and the sort of minimalist government championed by Barry Goldwater and the Republican right. Driven by his own predilections and by the object lesson of growth liberalism's implosion, Nixon moved as president to scale back government undertakings abroad and at home while still honoring basic international and domestic commitments.

== Personality and public image ==
Nixon's career was frequently dogged by his persona and the public's perception of it. Editorial cartoonists and comedians often exaggerated his appearance and mannerisms to the point where the line between the human and the caricature became increasingly blurred. He was often portrayed with unshaven jowls, slumped shoulders, and a furrowed, sweaty brow.

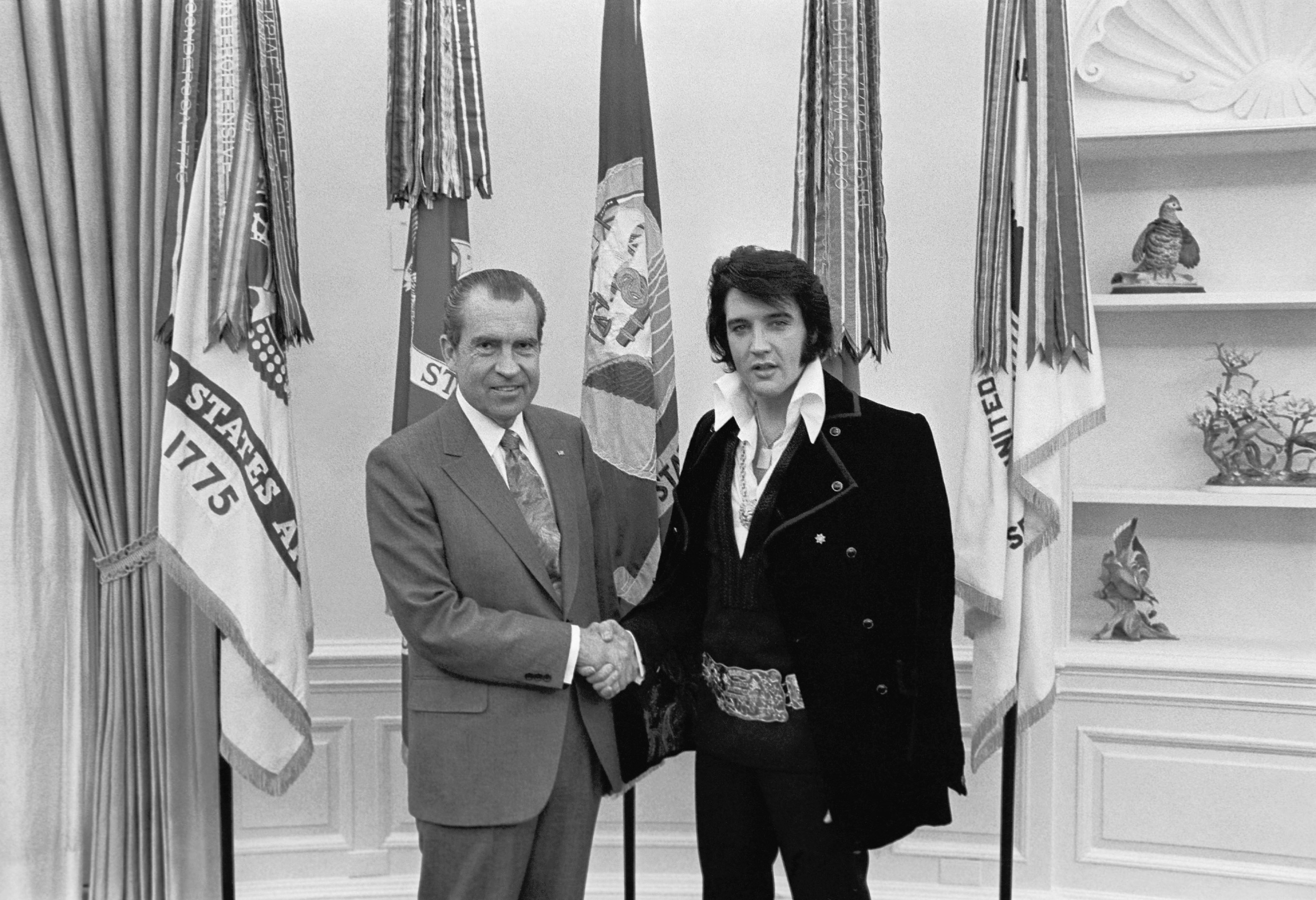
Nixon with Elvis Presley in December 1970

Nixon had a complex personality, both very secretive and awkward, yet strikingly reflective about himself. He was inclined to distance himself from people and was formal in all aspects, wearing a coat and tie even when home alone. Nixon biographer Conrad Black described him as being "driven" though also "uneasy with himself in some ways". According to Black, Nixon

thought that he was doomed to be traduced, double-crossed, unjustly harassed, misunderstood, underappreciated, and subjected to the trials of Job, but that by the application of his mighty will, tenacity, and diligence, he would ultimately prevail.

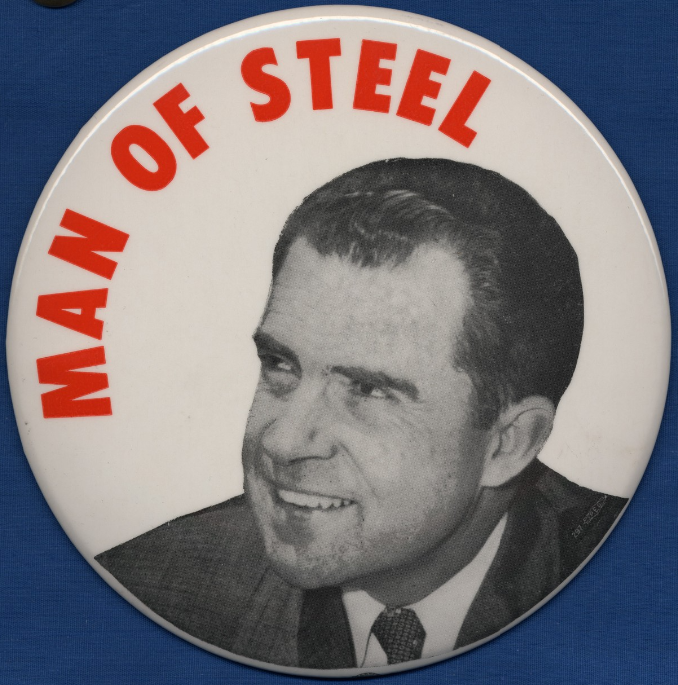
1960 campaign button

Nixon sometimes drank alcohol to excess, especially in 1970. He was also prescribed sleeping pills. According to Ray Price, Nixon sometimes took them in together. Nixon also took dilantin, recommended by Jack Dreyfus. That medicine is usually prescribed to treat and prevent seizures, but in Nixon's case, it was for depression. His periodic overindulgences, especially during stressful times such as during Apollo 13, concerned Price and others, including then-advisor Ehrlichman and long-time valet Manolo Sanchez. Author David Owen deemed Nixon an alcoholic.

Biographer Elizabeth Drew summarized Nixon as a "smart, talented man, but most peculiar and haunted of presidents". In his account of the Nixon presidency, author Richard Reeves described Nixon as "a strange man of uncomfortable shyness, who functioned best alone with his thoughts". Nixon's presidency was doomed by his personality, Reeves argues:

He assumed the worst in people, and he brought out the worst in them ... He clung to the idea of being "tough". He thought that was what had brought him to the edge of greatness. But that was what betrayed him. He could not open himself to other men, and he could not open himself to greatness.

In October 1999, a volume of 1971 White House audio tapes was released, which contained multiple statements by Nixon deemed derogatory toward Jews. In one conversation with H. R. Haldeman, Nixon said that Washington was "full of Jews" and that "most Jews are disloyal", making exceptions for some of his top aides. He then added, "But, Bob, generally speaking, you can't trust the bastards. They turn on you. Am I wrong or right?" Elsewhere on the 1971 recordings, Nixon denies being antisemitic, saying, "If anybody who's been in this chair ever had reason to be antisemitic, I did ... And I'm not, you know what I mean?"

Nixon believed that putting distance between himself and other people was necessary for him as he advanced in his political career and became president. Even Bebe Rebozo, by some accounts his closest friend, did not call him by his first name. Nixon said of this,

Even with close friends, I don't believe in letting your hair down, confiding this and that and the other thing—saying, "Gee, I couldn't sleep ..." I believe you should keep your troubles to yourself. That's just the way I am. Some people are different. Some people think it's good therapy to sit with a close friend and, you know, just spill your guts ... [and] reveal their inner psyche—whether they were breast-fed or bottle-fed. Not me. No way.

When Nixon was told that most Americans felt they did not know him even at the end of his career, he replied, "Yeah, it's true. And it's not necessary for them to know."

== Books ==
External videos
- Part One of Booknotes interview with Nixon on Seize the Moment, February 23, 1992
- Part Two of Booknotes interview, March 1, 1992

- Nixon, Richard M. (1960). Six Crises. Doubleday. ISBN 978-0-385-00125-0.
- Nixon, Richard M. (1978). RN: The Memoirs of Richard Nixon. Simon & Schuster. ISBN 978-0-671-70741-5.
- Nixon, Richard M. (1980). The Real War. Sidgwick & Jackson Ltd. ISBN 978-0-283-98650-5.
- Nixon, Richard M. (1982). Leaders. Random House ISBN 978-0-446-51249-7.
- Nixon, Richard M. (1984). Real Peace. Sidgwick & Jackson Ltd. ISBN 978-0-283-99076-2.
- Nixon, Richard M. (1987). No More Vietnams. Arbor House Publishing. ISBN 978-0-87795-668-6.
- Nixon, Richard M. (1988). 1999: Victory Without War. Simon & Schuster. ISBN 978-0-671-62712-6.
- Nixon, Richard M. (1990). In the Arena: A Memoir of Victory, Defeat, and Renewal. Simon & Schuster. ISBN 978-0-671-72318-7.
- Nixon, Richard M. (1992). Seize the Moment: America's Challenge in a One-Superpower World. Simon & Schuster. ISBN 978-0-671-74343-7.
- Nixon, Richard M. (1994). Beyond Peace. Random House. ISBN 978-0-679-43323-1.

== See also ==
- Cultural depictions of Richard Nixon
- Electoral history of Richard Nixon
- List of presidents of the United States
- List of presidents of the United States by previous experience
- Presidential transition of Richard Nixon
- Timeline of the Watergate scandal

== Notes ==
U.S. House of Representatives
Preceded by Jerry Voorhis	Member of the U.S. House of Representatives from California's 12th congressional district 1947–1950	Succeeded by Patrick J. Hillings
U.S. Senate
Preceded by Sheridan Downey	United States Senator (Class 3) from California; 1950–1953; Served alongside: William Knowland	Succeeded by Thomas Kuchel
Party political offices
Preceded by Frederick F. Houser	Republican nominee for U.S. Senator from California (Class 3); 1950	Succeeded by Thomas Kuchel
Preceded by Earl Warren	Republican nominee for Vice President of the United States; 1952, 1956	Succeeded by Henry Cabot Lodge Jr.
Preceded by Dwight D. Eisenhower	Republican nominee for President of the United States; 1960	Succeeded by Barry Goldwater
Preceded by William F. Knowland	Republican nominee for Governor of California; 1962	Succeeded by Ronald Reagan
Preceded by Barry Goldwater	Republican nominee for President of the United States; 1968, 1972	Succeeded by Gerald Ford
Political offices
Preceded by Alben W. Barkley	Vice President of the United States; 1953–1961	Succeeded by Lyndon B. Johnson
Preceded by Lyndon B. Johnson	President of the United States; 1969–1974	Succeeded by Gerald Ford
