= Feliciano Espinoza =

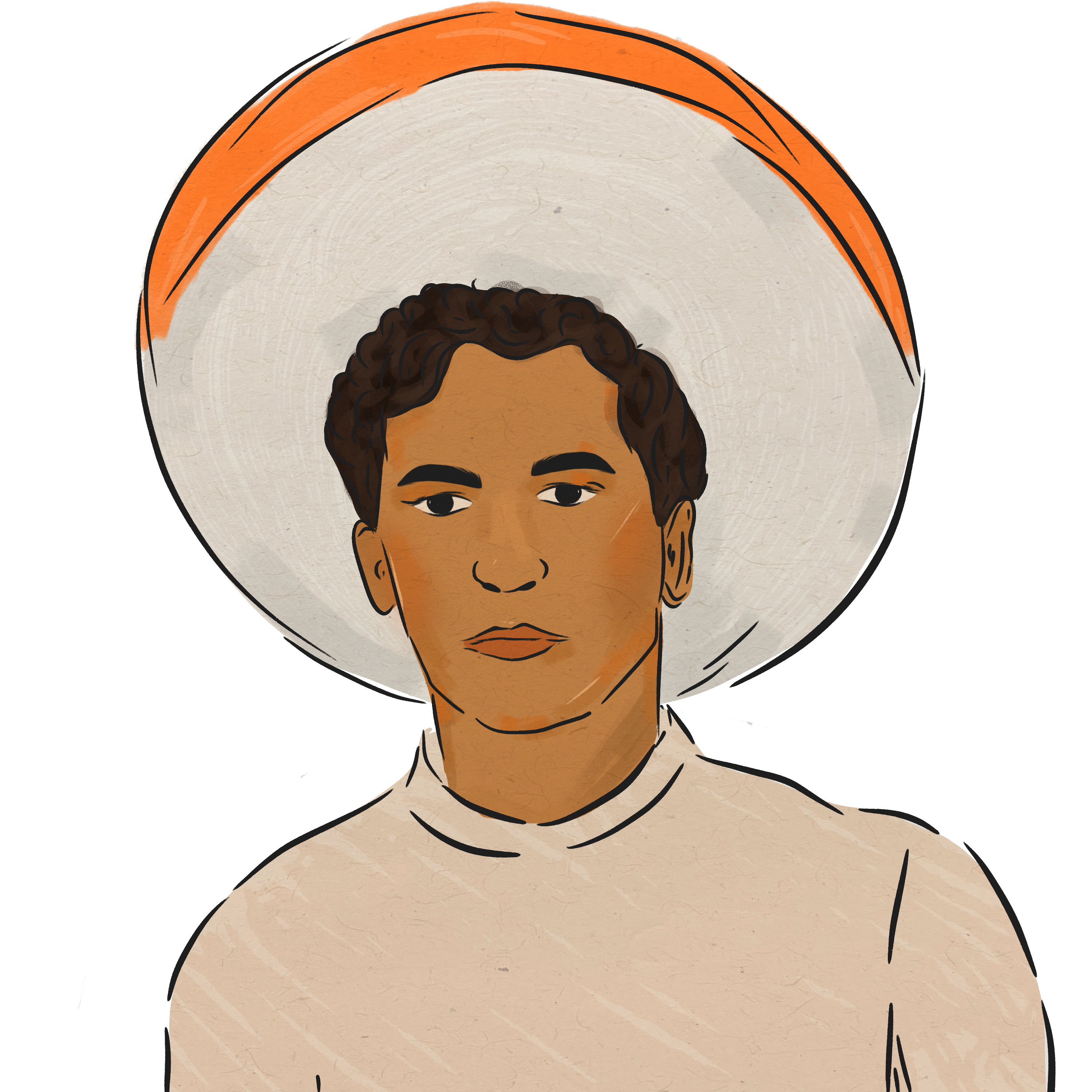
Digital depiction of Feliciano Espinoza by Julia Sorrenti

Feliciano "Félix" Espinoza (Texas, October 20, 1927 - Indianapolis, January 9th, 2007) was a merchant and civil rights leader. Along with Fred Bowman, Tony Dominguez, and Tulio Guldner, he organized the Hispano-American Association in 1969 to cater to Indianapolis' growing Hispanic population needs. Espinoza also owned and operated El Nopal Market, the city's first Mexican grocery store in the mid-1960s.

== Biography ==
Feliciano was born in Texas on October 20, 1927. In 1950, he married María Balli, moved to Indianapolis and started working on the railroad industry. They had eight children, lived in a small neighborhood known as El Barrio, which had a strong Mexican presence on the east side of downtown.

In 1960, they opened El Nopal Mexican Market at their home, the store being at the front of their house. Maria administered the store, and Feliciano baked items and made piñatas to sell on the store. Nine years later, they were forced to leave the house for a highway construction.

=== Political activity ===
Espinoza hosted a one-hour radio show on station WFMS, presenting Mexican music and job opportunities. Richard Luger, while running for mayor of Indianapolis, approached him to reach to Hispanic voters. Espinoza accepted to campaign for Luger, and was also active in Richard Nixon's Indianapolis presidential campaign in 1968.

On 1969, Espinoza, Fred Bowman, Tony Dominguez, and Tulio Guldner created the Hispano-American Association to tend for the growing Hispanic population in Indianapolis. In 1971, they got grants from the federal government and support from Mayor Richard Lugar's office and several churched to fund the Hispano-American Center, focused on providing daycare services, language classes, and job information.
