= Richard Nixon 1968 presidential campaign =

Committee for Nixon
- Campaign: 1968 Republican primaries 1968 U.S. presidential election
- Candidate: Richard Nixon; 36th Vice President of the United States (1953–1961); Spiro Agnew; 55th Governor of Maryland (1967–1969)
- Affiliation: Republican Party
- Status: Announced: February 2, 1968; Official nominee: August 8, 1968; Won election: November 5, 1968; Certification: January 6, 1969; Inaugurated: January 20, 1969
- Headquarters: 1726 Pennsylvania Ave., NW; Washington, D.C.
- Slogan(s): Nixon's the One! Nixon Now, More Than Ever; Vote Like Your Whole World Depended on It; Bring Us Together (post-victory)

The 1968 presidential campaign of Richard Nixon, the 36th vice president of the United States, began when Nixon, the Republican nominee of 1960, formally announced his candidacy, following a year's preparation and five years' political reorganization after defeats in the 1960 presidential election and the 1962 California gubernatorial election.

En route to the Republican Party's presidential nomination, Nixon faced challenges from Governor George Romney of Michigan, Governor Nelson Rockefeller of New York, Governor Ronald Reagan of California, and Senator Charles Percy of Illinois. Nixon won nine of the thirteen state primaries held that season, although due to the population of his state, Governor Reagan won the popular vote while carrying only California. These victories, along with pledged delegate support from states not holding primaries, secured Nixon the nomination on the first ballot of the Republican National Convention, where he named Governor Spiro Agnew of Maryland as his running mate.

In the general election, Nixon emphasized "law and order", positioning himself as the champion of what he called the "silent majority". Running well ahead of his opponent, incumbent Vice President Hubert Humphrey, his support slipped in the polls following his refusal to partake in presidential debates, and following an announcement from President Lyndon B. Johnson that a halt in the bombing of Vietnam had been negotiated.

Winning a close election on November 5, 1968, Nixon and Agnew were inaugurated as the 37th president of the United States and 39th vice president of the United States, respectively, on January 20, 1969. Nixon was the first vice president since Martin Van Buren in 1836 to be elected president without first having succeeded to that office through the death of his predecessor, and the first non-incumbent vice president to be elected president. This feat would be eventually accomplished 52 years later by Joe Biden.

== Background ==
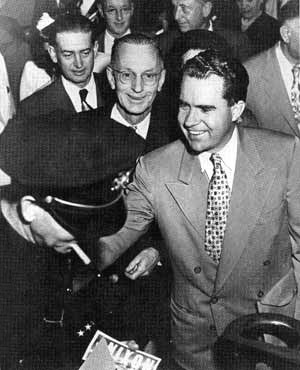
Nixon during his 1950 senatorial campaign

Nixon was elected to the United States House of Representatives in 1946, representing California's 12th congressional district from 1947 until his election to the Senate in 1950. As a member of Congress, he gained a reputation as a firm anti-Communist. In 1952, he was selected by General Dwight D. Eisenhower, the Republican nominee for president, as his vice presidential nominee. Elected together with Eisenhower, he served as vice president during the height of the Cold War. In office, he traveled the world on "goodwill tours", promoting pro-American policies; he was re-elected with Eisenhower in 1956. At the end of Eisenhower's second term in 1960, Nixon ran unopposed for the Republican nomination, which he received. He lost a close race to Senator John F. Kennedy of Massachusetts, which many credited in part to his unhealthy appearance during the first televised debate.

Nixon ran for Governor of California against incumbent Pat Brown, and was defeated handily, leading the media to label him as a "loser". This defeat was widely believed to be the end of his career; in an impromptu concession speech the morning after the election, Nixon famously blamed the media for favoring his opponent, saying, "you won't have Nixon to kick around anymore because, gentlemen, this is my last press conference." In September, the New York Post published an article claiming that campaign donors were buying influence with Nixon by providing him with a secret cash fund for his personal expenses. He moved to New York, joining the Mudge Rose Guthrie Alexander & Ferdon law firm, and regrouped, considering (but deciding against) a run for president in 1964, and beginning to plan for a 1968 presidential campaign.

== Campaign developments ==
=== Early stages ===
On January 7, 1967, Nixon held a secret meeting with his closest advisers to discuss a potential campaign, brainstorming strategies to obtain sufficient delegates to win the Republican nomination. He asked the attendees not to discuss the meeting with anyone, but to spread subtle hints that he would run for president. The next month, during an interview with the Saturday Evening Post, Nixon flatly denied he was running for president. Nevertheless, polls suggested that he was the front-runner for the nomination. The Gallup poll from February 1967 showed Nixon leading Governor George Romney, his closest rival, 52% to 40%. At this time he quietly began efforts to organize in Indiana, Nebraska, New Hampshire, Oregon, and Wisconsin, positioning to secure victories in those states' primaries the following year. In March, he gained the support of the 1964 Republican nominee, Senator Barry Goldwater of Arizona. A "Nixon for President Committee" formed that month, and headquarters for the organization opened in Washington D.C. in late May.

During the spring and summer, Nixon traveled to Eastern Europe and Latin America to bolster his foreign policy credentials. He returned in August to conduct meetings with his advisers to formulate a solid campaign strategy. Two days later, his campaign manager, Gaylord Parkinson, left his position to care for his ailing wife. Political commentators speculated that the vacancy built "an element of instability" for the campaign. The position was soon temporarily filled by former Governor Henry Bellmon of Oklahoma. The next week, five staff members were fired after private investigators determined that information had been leaked to the campaigns of potential primary rivals Governors Rockefeller and Reagan. The news did not stall the progression of the campaign, and soon Nixon, Mudge, Rose, Guthrie & Alexander member Leonard Garment assembled an advertising team that included CBS Television president Frank Shakespeare.

==== Fall 1967 ====
By mid-September 1967, the Nixon campaign had organized headquarters in four states deemed critical to the Republican primaries. Nixon hoped this move would increase his delegate strength and demonstrate his "ability to win". He notified the media that his decision on whether to run for president would be formally announced at some time between early December and February. Meanwhile, Nixon and his staff discussed handling the topic of the Vietnam War. They advised him to soften his stance on the war, and encouraged him to shift his focus from foreign affairs to domestic policy to avoid the divisive war issue. Observers noted that this move potentially hurt Nixon by straying from his reputation "as a foreign policy expert".

In October, political experts predicted that Nixon would gain delegates in the important states of New Hampshire, Wisconsin and Nebraska during the primary season, scheduled to begin in March 1968. They noted that in the other critical state of Oregon, Ronald Reagan would have an advantage due to the proximity of his home state. Like Nixon, rival George Romney began to organize in these states. Romney officially announced his candidacy in November, prompting Nixon to step up his efforts. He spent most of this period on the campaign trail in New Hampshire. Those following Nixon noted that during this period, he seemed more relaxed and easygoing than in his past political career. One commentator examined that he was not "the drawn, tired figure who debated Jack Kennedy or the angry politician who conceded his California [gubernatorial] defeat with such ill grace." Making appearances at fundraisers in his adopted home state of New York, Nixon helped to raise $300,000 for the re-election campaign of Senator Jacob K. Javits. At the end of December, Time labeled Nixon as the "man to beat".

==== 1968 begins ====
Nixon entered 1968 as the front-runner for the Republican nomination. However, polls suggested that in a head-to-head match up with incumbent President Lyndon B. Johnson, Nixon trailed 50% to 41%. Later in January, Nixon embarked on a tour of Texas, where he lampooned President Johnson's State of the Union address, asking: "Can this nation afford to have four more years of Lyndon Johnson's policies that have failed at home and abroad?" At this time, reports suggested that Nixon would formally announce his bid in February.

=== Primary campaign ===
On February 1 in New Hampshire, Nixon announced his candidacy for the Republican nomination, commenting that problems "beyond politics" needed to be addressed. Immediately following his entrance, the media team prepared for an advertising campaign. They analyzed video of Nixon, determining that he was at his best when speaking spontaneously. The team organized a question and answer session with seven members of the New Hampshire Republican Party, taping Nixon's responses for editing and use in advertisements. He campaigned in the state, although polls suggested that he would easily win its primary. As a result, he began campaigning in Wisconsin where the second primary would be held. During a stop, he briefly discussed Vietnam, although not in detail, stating that the United States "must prevent [such] confrontations", but that the nation must also "help people in the free world fight against aggression, but not do their fighting for them." He used those dictatorships in Latin America as an example, stating: "I am talking not about marching feet but helping hands." As military operations increased in Vietnam in mid-February, Nixon's standing against President Johnson improved. A Harris poll showed that he trailed the president 43% to 48%. Near the end of the month, Nixon's opponent George Romney exited the race, mostly due to comments he made about being "brainwashed" during a visit to Vietnam. This left Nixon nearly unopposed for the upcoming primaries, narrowing his opponents to Nelson Rockefeller and Ronald Reagan, neither of whom had announced their candidacies.

Due to Romney's exit, Nixon declared in early March that he would "greatly expand [his] efforts in the non-primary states", with Time observing that Nixon could now focus his political attacks solely on President Johnson. However, the void also caused problems for Nixon; Time argued that the prospect of soundly defeating second-tier candidates (such as former Governor Harold Stassen of Minnesota) in the primaries would not "electrify the voters". The Nixon campaign countered this claim stating that Romney's withdrawal was a "TKO" at the hands of Nixon. Meanwhile, Rockefeller began to be viewed more as a candidate, articulating that while not wishing to split the party, he was "willing to serve...if called." As talks of other candidates persisted, Nixon continued with campaigning and discussion of the issues. He pledged to end the war in Vietnam, but would not go into detail, drawing some criticism. Nixon easily won the New Hampshire primary on March 12, pulling in 80% of the vote with a write-in campaign, while Rockefeller received 11%. At the end of March, Rockefeller announced that he would not campaign for the presidency, but would be open to being drafted. Nixon doubted the prospect of a draft, stating that it would only be likely if "I make some rather serious mistake." Reports suggested that the decision caused "Nixon's political stock [to] skyrocket." Polling by Gallup at this time revealed that Nixon led President Johnson 41% to 39% in a three-way race with American Independent Party candidate and former Governor George Wallace of Alabama.

As the Wisconsin primary loomed in early April, Nixon's only obstacle seemed to be preventing his supporters from voting in the Democratic primary for Senator Eugene McCarthy of Minnesota as a protest against President Johnson. However, Johnson withdrew from the race before the primary, meanwhile Governor Reagan's name was on the ballot in Wisconsin, but he did not campaign in the state and was still not a declared candidate. Nixon won the primary with 80%, followed by Reagan with 11% and Stassen with 6%. With Johnson removed from the race, Nixon fell behind Democratic candidates Eugene McCarthy, Hubert Humphrey and Robert F. Kennedy in head-to-head match-ups. At the end of April, Nixon called for a moratorium on criticism of the Johnson policy in Vietnam as negotiations were underway: "The one man who can do anything about peace is Lyndon Johnson, and I'm not going to do anything to undercut him." The reality was that Nixon conspired to subvert the peace negotiations, thus violating the Logan Act, a felony. However, the Democratic candidates for president remained fair game for criticism. He argued that "A divided Democratic Party cannot unite a divided country; a united Republican Party can." He also began to discuss economics more frequently, announcing plans to cut spending while criticizing the Democrats' policy of raising taxes. During a question and answer session with the American Society of Newspaper Editors, Nixon spoke out of turn, receiving numerous interruptions of applause. The largest came when he addressed the issue of crime, proclaiming that "there cannot be order in a free society without progress, and there cannot be progress without order."

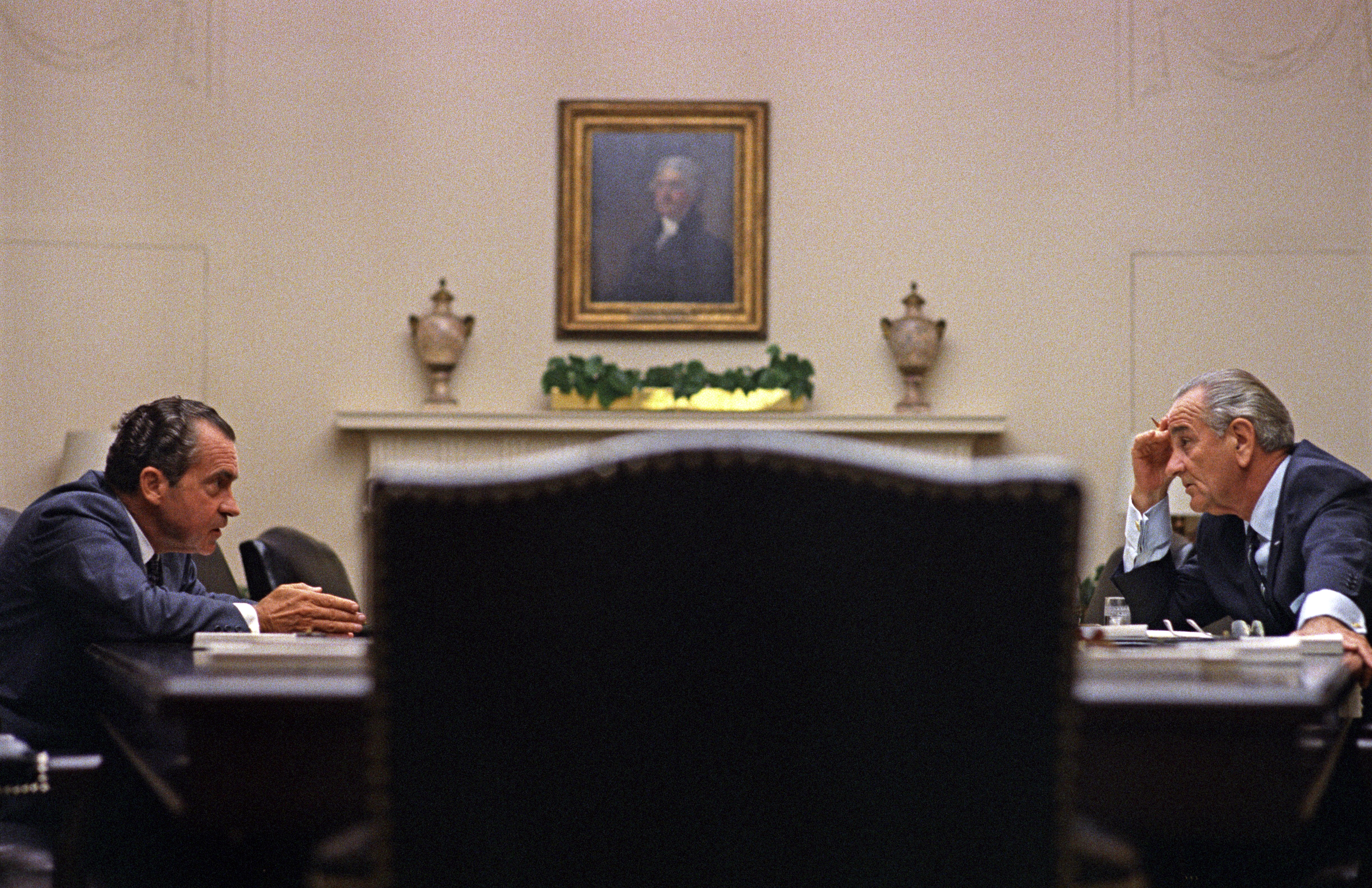
Candidate Nixon meets with President Johnson in the White House shortly before the Republican convention

On the last day of April, Rockefeller announced that he would campaign for the presidency, despite his previous statement to the contrary. Immediately following his entrance, he defeated Nixon in the Massachusetts primary 30% to 26%. New Harris polls found that Rockefeller fared better against Democratic candidates than Nixon, but the outlook started to appear better for Nixon after he won the Indiana primary over Rockefeller. After that victory, Nixon campaigned in Nebraska where he criticized the three leading Democratic candidates as "three peas in a pod, prisoners of the policies of the past." He then proposed a plan to tackle crime that included wiretapping, legislation to reverse previous Supreme Court decisions, and the formation of a congressional committee targeting crime and reforms to the criminal justice system. He did not connect crime to racial rioting, drawing praise from Civil Rights leaders. Nixon won the primary in Nebraska, defeating the undeclared Reagan 71% to 22%. At the following primary in Oregon, Reagan seemed more willing to compete with Nixon, and Rockefeller sat out, but Nixon won with 72%, fifty points ahead of Reagan.

In early June, Nixon continued to be regarded as the favorite to win the nomination, but observers noted that he had not yet locked up the nomination. He still faced challenges from Nelson Rockefeller and Ronald Reagan, and was not on the ballot in California, where Reagan won a large slate of delegates. Behind the scenes, Nixon staff lobbied for delegates from "favorite son" candidates, resulting, in the backing of Senator Howard Baker of Tennessee, and his 28 pledged delegates, as well as those 58 delegates supporting Senator Charles Percy of Illinois. After the assassination of Robert F. Kennedy, like the other candidates, Nixon took a break from campaigning. Reports suggested that the assassination all but assured his nomination. Upon returning to the trail, Nixon found that Rockefeller had begun attacking him. Rockefeller described Nixon as a man "of the old politics" who has "great natural capacity not to do the right thing, especially under pressure." Nixon refused to respond to the jabs, stating that he would not participate in attacks. As he edged closer to the nomination, discussions about his running mate arose. Republicans in the Midwest pushed for Mayor John Lindsay of New York City. The endorsement of Nixon by Senator Mark Hatfield of Oregon raised speculation that he might be chosen. Congressman George Bush of Texas and Senator Percy were also mentioned as possible selections. At the end of the month, Nixon had two-thirds of the required 667 delegates necessary to win the nomination.

On July 1, Nixon received the endorsement of Senator John G. Tower of Texas, handing him at least 40 delegates. With his nomination all but assured, Nixon's ad team began preparing for the general election. A series of advertisements featuring question and answer sessions with Nixon and friends of campaign staffers were filmed in New York. The tapes were sent to the swing states of Illinois, Michigan, and Ohio, giving Nixon the advantage of advertising long before the Democratic Party settled on a candidate. At this time, Nixon decided with a group of legislators that "crime and disorder" would be presented as the number one issue in the nation. This continued to be a major theme of the Nixon campaign, and would continue to be used extensively during the general election. Nixon publicly announced his opposition to the military draft, proposing to replace the current system with a volunteer army encouraged with higher pay. President Eisenhower endorsed Nixon in mid-July, breaking his tradition of waiting until after the primary, due to the election's importance. By July's end, reports circulated that Nixon had 691 probable delegates for the convention, placing him over the 667 delegate threshold; Rockefeller, however, disputed these numbers. Sources within Washington reported that Reagan caused greater concern for the Nixon campaign than Rockefeller. A possible scenario surfaced where Nixon's southern delegates would drop their support to back the more conservative Reagan. Nonetheless, Nixon staffers believed that if such a scenario occurred, liberal Rockefeller delegates in the Northeast would support Nixon to prevent a Reagan nomination.

== Republican National Convention ==
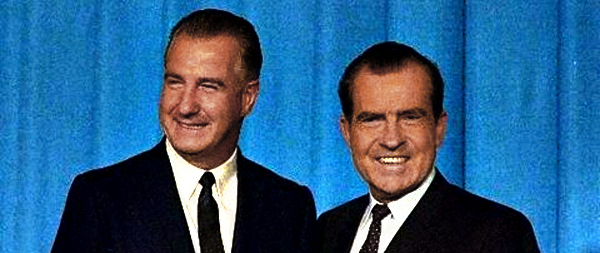
Nixon (right) with VP nominee Spiro Agnew

The 1968 Republican National Convention was held from August 5 to 9 at the Miami Beach Convention Center in Miami Beach, Florida. At the convention, Richard Nixon won the nomination for president on the first ballot with 692 delegates. Behind him finished Governor Rockefeller, second with 277 delegates, followed by Governor Ronald Reagan, in third place, having just entered the race, accruing 182 delegates. Nixon's early nomination occurred partly because he held on to delegates in the South largely influenced by Senator Strom Thurmond of South Carolina, Harry Dent, then chairman of the South Carolina Republican Party, and delegate Charlton Lyons of Louisiana. Thurmond, Dent and Lyons agreed to support Nixon after Nixon and his subordinates made concessions regarding civil rights, the Supreme Court, and the choice of a vice-presidential candidate.

Following nomination, Nixon held his hands in the air with his trademark "V" sign of victory, delivering an acceptance speech written over the preceding weeks. The speech critiqued the Johnson administration and appealed for law and order both at home and abroad. In his speech, he remarked:

Tonight I do not promise the millennium in the morning. I don't promise that we can eradicate poverty and end discrimination in the space of four or even eight years. But I do promise action. And a new policy for peace abroad, a new policy for peace and progress and justice at home.

He called for a new era of negotiation with communist nations, and a strengthening of the criminal justice system to restore law and order. Marking himself as a champion of the American Dream, he stressed greater unity, invoking the silent majority. Nixon also discussed economics, articulating his opposition to social welfare, advocating programs designed to help African Americans start their own small businesses. By the end of his address, he promised that "the long dark night for America is about to end."

Following the speech, Nixon formally selected Governor Spiro Agnew of Maryland as his running mate, who received 1119 delegate votes, with the distant second being Governor Romney with 186. Agnew was relatively unknown nationally, and was selected due to his purported appeal to African Americans, and work for the Nixon campaign after an embarrassing experience as the head of the Draft Rockefeller movement. It was later noted that the convention had featured Nixon as the centrist candidate with Rockefeller to his left and Reagan to his right. The same analysis applied to the general campaign, as commentators noted that Nixon would stand to the right of the still undecided Democratic nominee but would fall to the left of American Independent Party candidate George Wallace.

== General election ==
Nixon's campaign slogan, commonly used on posters and bumper stickers

As the general election season began, Nixon focused his efforts on the "big seven" states: California, Illinois, Michigan, New York, Ohio, Pennsylvania, and Texas. He hired Roger Ailes, whom he had first encountered during an appearance on The Mike Douglas Show, to produce one-hour television programs to advertise the campaign in strategic regions. The campaign also continued to use televised staged town hall segments throughout the campaign, which aired live, featuring friendly voters who were instructed to ask tough questions, following the campaign's belief that Nixon would respond well to such questions. Starting the ground campaign tour, during his first stop in Springfield, Illinois, he discussed the importance of unity, stating that "America [now] needs to be united more than any time since Lincoln." He then traveled to Michigan, Ohio and Pennsylvania before returning to New York, meeting with Governor Rockefeller. In those Gallup polls following the convention, Nixon led Humphrey 45% to 29% and topped McCarthy 42% to 37%. At the end of the month, Hubert Humphrey narrowly won Democratic presidential nominee over McCarthy at the Democratic convention, which was filled with protest and riots. Analysts saw the Democrat's split, along with lacking "law and order" at the convention, positioning Nixon well. Shortly before the convention and throughout the general election, Nixon received regular briefings from President Johnson on developments in the Vietnam War. The President made it clear to Nixon that he did not want the war to be politicized, to which Nixon agreed, although questioning Humphrey's eventual compliance.

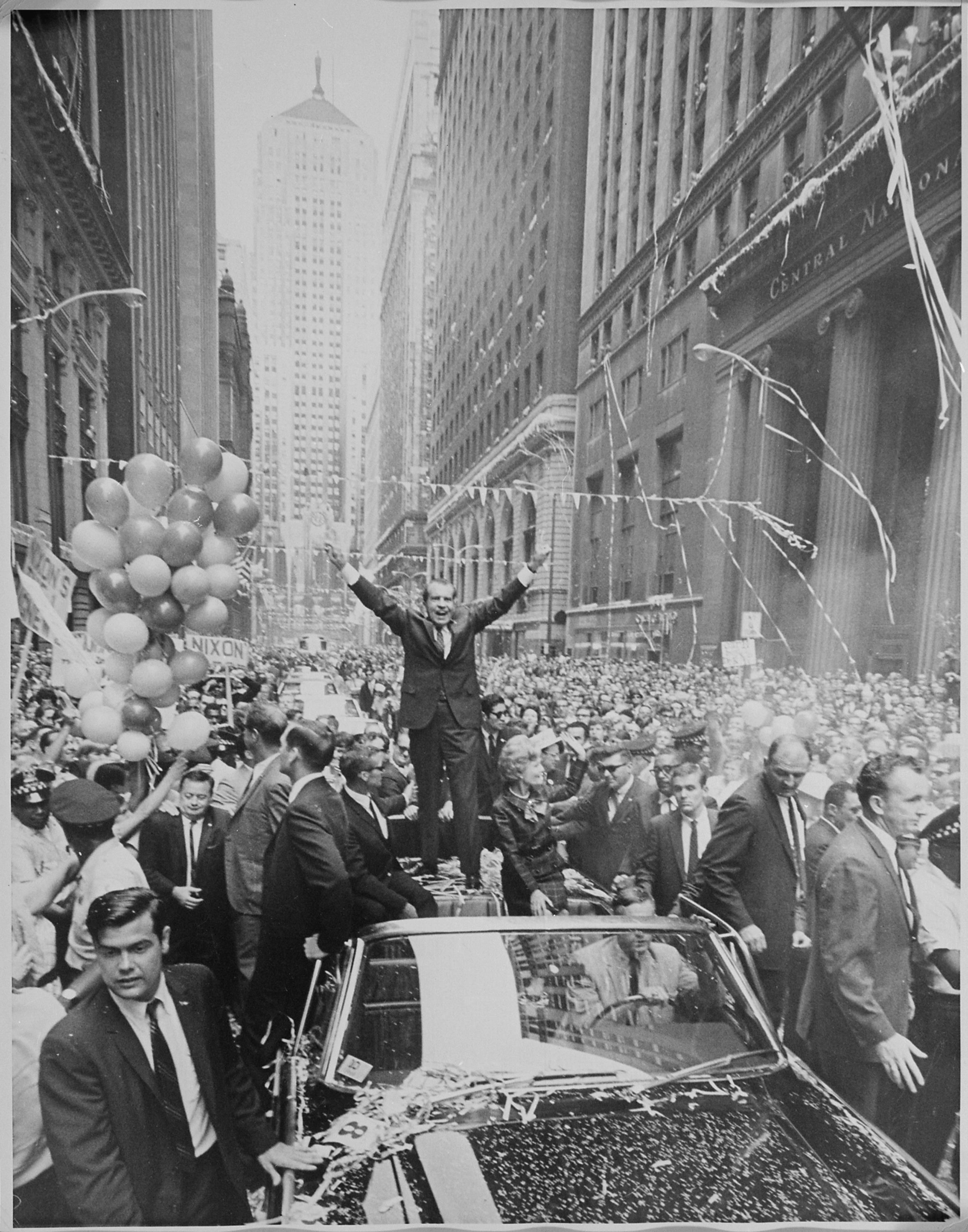
Republican nominee Richard Nixon gives his trademark 'V' sign as he stands atop a motorcade vehicle during a Tickertape parade in the Chicago Loop, shortly after the Democratic Convention in the same city.

Following the Democratic convention, Nixon was consistently labeled the favorite, described as "relaxed [and] confident", counter to his "unsure" self from 1960. Even observers speculated as to the President's possible favoring Nixon to Humphrey. In a visit to Chicago shortly after the Democratic convention, Nixon received a large welcome and ticker tape parade, with crowds estimated at several hundred thousand.

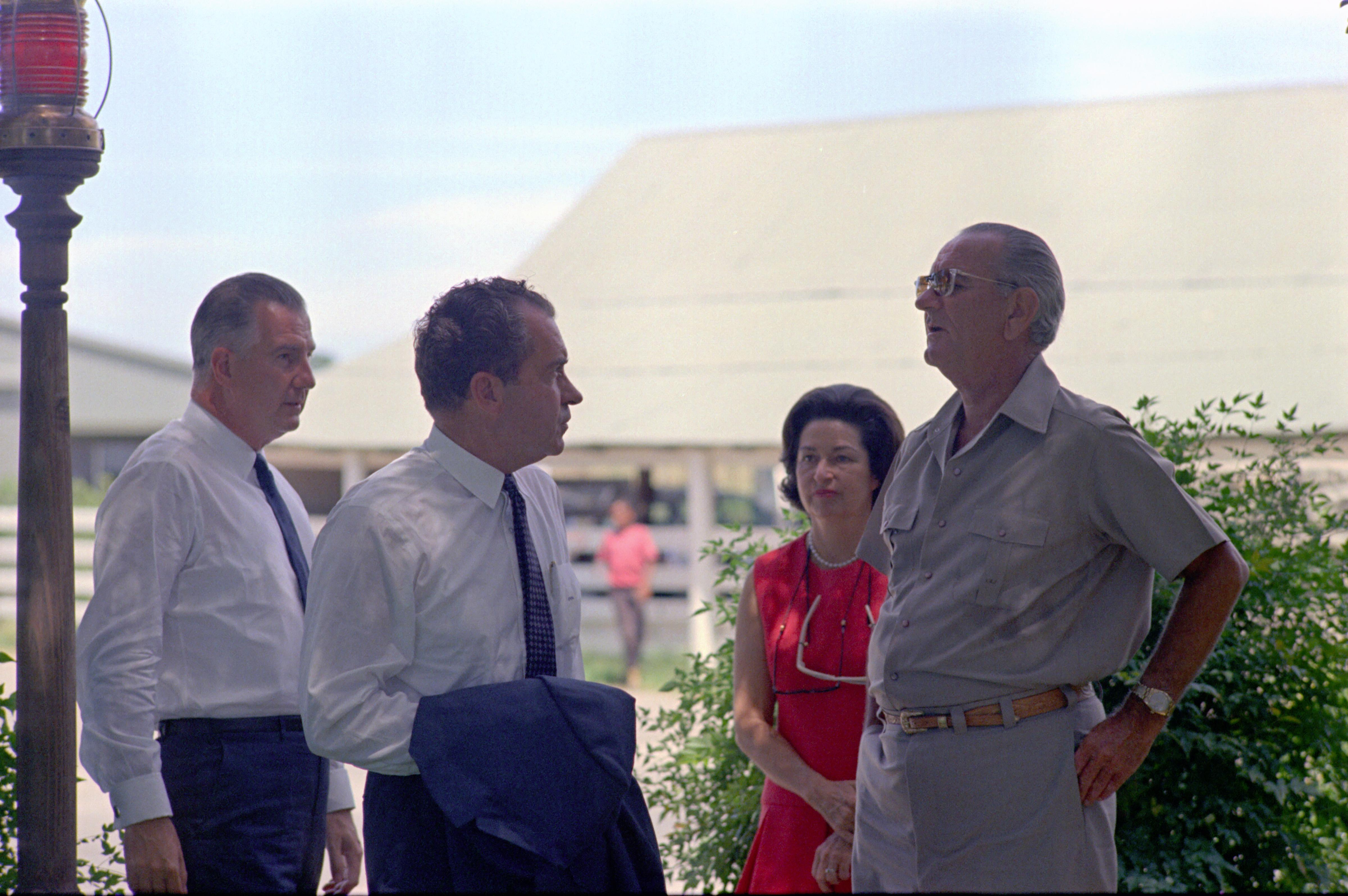
Nominees Nixon and Agnew, without suit jackets, meet with casually dressed President Johnson at his ranch in Texas, with the First Lady, Lady Bird Johnson, in the background

Before his visit, he called upon Senator Edward Brooke of Massachusetts, the highest ranking African American in U.S. government, to campaign with him on trips to Illinois and California. Referring to Brooke as "one of my top advisers," he accompanied campaign stops in Chicago and San Francisco, a move critics described as an attempt to further gain favor within the African American community.

=== September ===
In mid-September, Nixon's running mate Spiro Agnew went on the offensive against Humphrey; he referred to the Vice President as being "soft on Communism", along with softness on inflation, and "law and order," comparing him to former British Prime Minister Neville Chamberlain. At this time Nixon sent his adviser, former Governor William Scranton of Pennsylvania, on a fact-finding trip to Europe to gather intelligence on Western alliance and Soviet issues. In response to Humphrey's calls for a face-to-face debate, Nixon remarked: "Before we can have a debate between Nixon and Humphrey, Humphrey's got to settle his debate with himself." Nixon campaigned in San Francisco in front of 10,000 supporters, amidst an array of protests. The candidate took on the protesters first-hand, and delivered his "forgotten American" speech, declaring that election day would be "a day of protest for the forgotten American", a group that included those that "obey the law, pay their taxes, go to church, send their children to school, love their country and demand new leadership." By month's end, many in the Nixon campaign believed his election was guaranteed, beginning to prepare for the transition period, despite Nixon's warning that "the one thing that can beat us now is overconfidence." Gallup showed Nixon leading Humphrey 43% to 28% at the end of September.

=== October ===
In early October commentators weighed Nixon's advantage, arguing that his placing of blame for the Vietnam War strictly on the Johnson administration, avoiding discussion of war with the excuse that he did not want to disrupt the peace talks in Paris, was shrewd and exploited his campaigning advantage, but was "deceptive". However, anti-war protesters heckled him repeatedly on the campaign trail. Nixon addressed the American Conservative Union on October 9, and argued that George Wallace's American Independent Party candidacy could split the anti-Administration vote, and help the Democrats. The Union decided to back Nixon over Wallace, labeling the third-party candidate's beliefs as "Populist". As Democratic vice presidential nominee Edmund Muskie criticized Nixon for his connections to Strom Thurmond, Nixon continued to oppose a possible debate with Humphrey and Wallace, as well as between running mates, on the basis that he did not want to give Wallace more exposure. It was also argued that Nixon opposition to debating was due to his experience during the 1960 encounter with John F. Kennedy, which many cited as a factor in his defeat. In another lesson learned from 1960, the campaign employed 100,000 workers to oversee election day polling sites to prevent a recurrence of what many Republicans viewed as the stolen election of that year. Nixon went on a whistle-stop train tour of Ohio near the end of October. From the back of the "Nixon Victory Special" car, he attacked Vice President Humphrey as well as the Secretary of Agriculture and Attorney General of the Johnson cabinet, over farmers' debt and rising crime. At this time, the campaign released two controversial television advertisements, juxtaposing a smiling Humphrey with images of the Vietnam War and the chaos at the 1968 Democratic National Convention; the advertisements aroused protests from the Humphrey campaign. By October's end, Nixon began to lose his edge over Humphrey; Gallup showing he led 44% to 36%, down five points from a few weeks earlier, a decline observers attributed to Nixon's refusal of a debate with Humphrey.

=== November ===
At the beginning of November, President Johnson announced that a bombing had been halted in Vietnam; observers noted that the development significantly helped Humphrey, although Nixon had endorsed such talks. In response, Nixon had employed operative Anna Chennault to tell the South Vietnamese that they could receive a better deal under Nixon. The White House initially learned of the Nixon machinations via a New York business contact and confirmed them via eavesdropping on the South Vietnamese embassy in Washington and South Vietnamese President Thieu's office in Saigon. Johnson expressed his outrage to Nixon supporters Senate Minority Leader Everett Dirksen and Senator George Smathers of Florida, but he did not go public because he did not have knowledge of Nixon's personal involvement and did not want to disclose U.S. surveillance of its ally. (He also expressed outrage over claims by Nixon supporter and future Secretary of Defense Melvin Laird that Johnson had misled Nixon in briefings on the war in Vietnam.) On the Sunday preceding the election, Nixon appeared on Meet the Press, explaining that he would cooperate completely with Johnson, phoning the President shortly thereafter to personally reassure him. The final Harris poll before the election indicated that Nixon was trailing Humphrey 43% to 40%, but Gallup's final poll showed Nixon leading 42% to 40%. On the eve of the election, Nixon and Humphrey bought time on rival television networks, Nixon appearing on NBC, Humphrey on ABC, where each made his final appeal to voters. After Humphrey's polling surge following the bombing halt, Nixon used this appearance to claim that he had just received "a very disturbing report", which detailed that tons of supplies were being moved into South Vietnam by the North. Humphrey labeled this charge as "irresponsible", causing Nixon to counter that Humphrey "doesn't know what's going on". Overall, Nixon spent $6,270,000 on television advertising, most of which was judged to have only reinforced supporters.

=== Election Day ===
Electoral college results of the general election, November 5, 1968

On November 5, it was a three-way race between Nixon, Humphrey, and Wallace. The results were very close, and not until early the following morning could news organizations call the election. In the end, Nixon won 301 electoral votes, with Humphrey receiving 191, and Wallace receiving 46. Nixon edged Humphrey in the popular vote by a margin of 43.42% to 42.72%, with Wallace gaining 13.53%. Nixon's victory came with a margin of less than three percent in California, Illinois, and Ohio; had Humphrey carried those three, Nixon would have lost the election. Nixon won most of the West and mid-West, but lost Texas and parts of the Northeast to Humphrey and lost the Deep South to Wallace. After the election was conceded by Vice President Humphrey, Nixon said the following in his press conference:

As you will probably have heard, I have received a very gracious message from the Vice President, congratulating me for winning the election. I congratulated him for his gallant and courageous fight against great odds ... I also told him that I know exactly how he felt. I know how it feels to lose a close one. - President-Elect Richard Nixon

== Aftermath ==
Nixon and Agnew took office as president and vice president during their inauguration on January 20, 1969. Following the election, the slogan "Bring Us Together", referencing a poster held by a 13-year-old girl at a rally during his campaign, was used as a basis for the theme of his inauguration, although it would later be seized by Democrats to attack later Nixon policies. In his inaugural address, Nixon said that "the greatest honor history can bestow is the title of peacemaker", outlining the direction Nixon sought to take, such as his visit to the People's Republic of China in 1972, opening diplomatic relations between the two nations, and détente plus the Anti-Ballistic Missile Treaty with the Soviet Union, all in his first term.

While overseeing an initial escalation of American involvement in the Vietnam War, he subsequently ended U.S. involvement in 1973, and eliminated the draft. Domestically, his administration generally embraced policies that transferred power from Washington to the states. Among other things, he initiated wars on cancer and drugs, imposed wage and price controls, enforced desegregation of Southern schools and established the Environmental Protection Agency. Though he presided over Apollo 11 and the subsequent lunar landings, he later scaled back crewed space exploration. In 1972, he was reelected by a landslide, the largest to that date. The Watergate scandal, which would consume the greater part of his second term, resulted in his ultimate resignation on August 9, 1974.

== Endorsements ==
List of Richard Nixon endorsements

All individuals are members or supporters of the Republican Party, unless otherwise stated.

Presidents of the United States

- Dwight D. Eisenhower, 34th President of the United States – under whom Nixon served as vice president, General of the Army

U.S. Senators

- George Aiken (R-VT)
- Howard Baker (R-TN)
- Edward Brooke (R-MA)
- Barry Goldwater (R-AZ)
- Charles Goodell (R-NY)
- Mark Hatfield (R-OR)
- Roman Hruska (R-NE)
- Jacob Javits (R-NY)
- Karl Earl Mundt (R-SD)
- George Smathers (D-FL)
- Strom Thurmond (R-SC)
- John Tower (R-TX)

U.S. Representatives

- Leslie C. Arends (R-IL)
- Joel Broyhill (R-VA)
- George H. W. Bush (R-TX)
- James G. Fulton (R-PA)
- Edward Gurney (R-FL)
- Syd Herlong (D-FL)
- Dan Kuykendall (R-TN)
- John Lindsay (R-NY)
- Clark MacGregor (R-MN)
- Catherine Dean May (R-WA)
- F. Bradford Morse (R-MA)
- Rogers Morton (R-MD)

Statewide officeholders

- Lieutenant Governor Robert Finch (R-CA)
- Governor Nelson Rockefeller (R-NY)

Celebrities

- Roy Acuff, singer
- Ray Bolger, actor
- Pat Boone, singer
- Rory Calhoun, actor
- Chuck Connors, actor
- Connie Francis, singer
- Zsa Zsa Gabor, actor
- Jackie Gleason, actor
- Art Linkletter, radio host
- Guy Lombardo, bandleader
- Tony Martin, singer
- Ray Milland, actor
- Hugh O'Brian, actor
- Tex Ritter, singer
- Ginger Rogers, actress
- Randolph Scott, actor
- Rudy Vallée, entertainer
- John Wayne, actor

Writer

- Ayn Rand
- Walter Lippmann

Athletes

- Wilt Chamberlain, basketball player
- Joe Louis, boxer
- Bart Starr, football player

== See also ==
- 1968 Republican Party presidential primaries
- 1968 Republican Party vice presidential candidate selection
- 1968 Republican National Convention
- 1968 United States presidential election
- Presidential transition of Richard Nixon
- First inauguration of Richard Nixon
- Hubert Humphrey 1968 presidential campaign
- Bring Us Together

== Bibliography ==
- Jamieson, Kathleen Hall (1996-06-20), Packaging the presidency: a history and criticism of presidential campaign advertising, Oxford University Press US, ISBN 978-0-19-508942-4
- McGinniss, Joe (1969), The Selling of the President 1968, Trident Press.
- Perlstein, Rick (2008), Nixonland: The Rise of a President and the Fracturing of America, Simon & Schuster, ISBN 978-0-7432-4302-5
