= Oath of office of the vice president of the United States =

JD Vance being sworn in as the 50th vice president of the United States on January 20, 2025

The oath of office of the vice president of the United States is the oath or affirmation that the vice president of the United States takes upon assuming the vice-presidency but before beginning the execution of the office. It is the same oath that members of the United States Congress and members of the president's cabinet take upon entering office.

Before the president-elect takes the oath of office on Inauguration Day, the vice president-elect takes their oath of office. Although the United States Constitution—Article II, Section One, Clause 8—specifically sets forth the oath required by incoming presidents, it does not do so for incoming vice presidents. Instead, Article VI, Clause 3 provides that "all ... Officers ... of the United States ... shall be bound by Oath or Affirmation, to support this Constitution". Pursuant to Article VI, the 1st United States Congress passed the Oath Administration Act (that remains in effect) which provides that "...the said oath or affirmation ... [required by the sixth article of the Constitution of the United States] … shall be administered to [the President of the Senate]". Since 1937, Inauguration Day has been January 20 (was March 4 previously), a change brought about by the 20th amendment to the Constitution, which had been ratified four years earlier. The vice president's swearing-in ceremony also moved that year, from the Senate chamber inside the Capitol, to the presidential inaugural platform outside the building.

The oath is as follows:

I do solemnly swear (or affirm) that I will support and defend the Constitution of the United States against all enemies, foreign and domestic; that I will bear true faith and allegiance to the same; that I take this obligation freely, without any mental reservation or purpose of evasion; and that I will well and faithfully discharge the duties of the office on which I am about to enter. So help me God.

== Background ==
Arkansas senator Joseph T. Robinson administering the vice presidential oath of office to John Nance Garner during the second inauguration of Franklin D. Roosevelt; January 20, 1937. This was the first filmed vice presidential oath of office in U.S. history.

The 1st Congress passed an oath act in May 1789, authorizing only U.S. senators to administer the oath to the vice president (who serves as the president of the Senate). Later that year, legislation passed that allowed courts to administer all oaths and affirmations. Since 1789, the oath has been changed several times by Congress. The present oath repeated by the vice president, senators, representatives, and other government officers has been in use since 1884.

When the vice presidency was established in 1789, and for the century that followed, the vice president was sworn in on the same date as the president, March 4, but at a separate location, typically in the United States Senate, where the vice president holds the office of President of the Senate. Up until the middle of the 20th century, the vice president-elect nearly always would be sworn in by the highest-ranking officer of the U.S. Senate which was the outgoing vice president or the president pro tempore of the United States Senate. Sometimes, although not always, a short address would be given by the new vice president to the Senate.

The oath of office has been administered most by the president pro tempore of the United States Senate (last in 1925) for a total of 20 times. Others to give the oath of office include the outgoing vice president (last in 1945) 12 times, an associate justice of the Supreme Court of the United States (last in 2025) 11 times, the chief justice of the United States (last in 2001) 6 times, U.S. senators that are not President Pro Tempore of the Senate (last in 1969) 5 times, the speaker of the United States House of Representatives (last in 2005) 4 times, a U.S. judge twice, and a U.S. consul once with one time being unrecorded. Former Chief Justice Warren E. Burger gave the oath the most times with three.

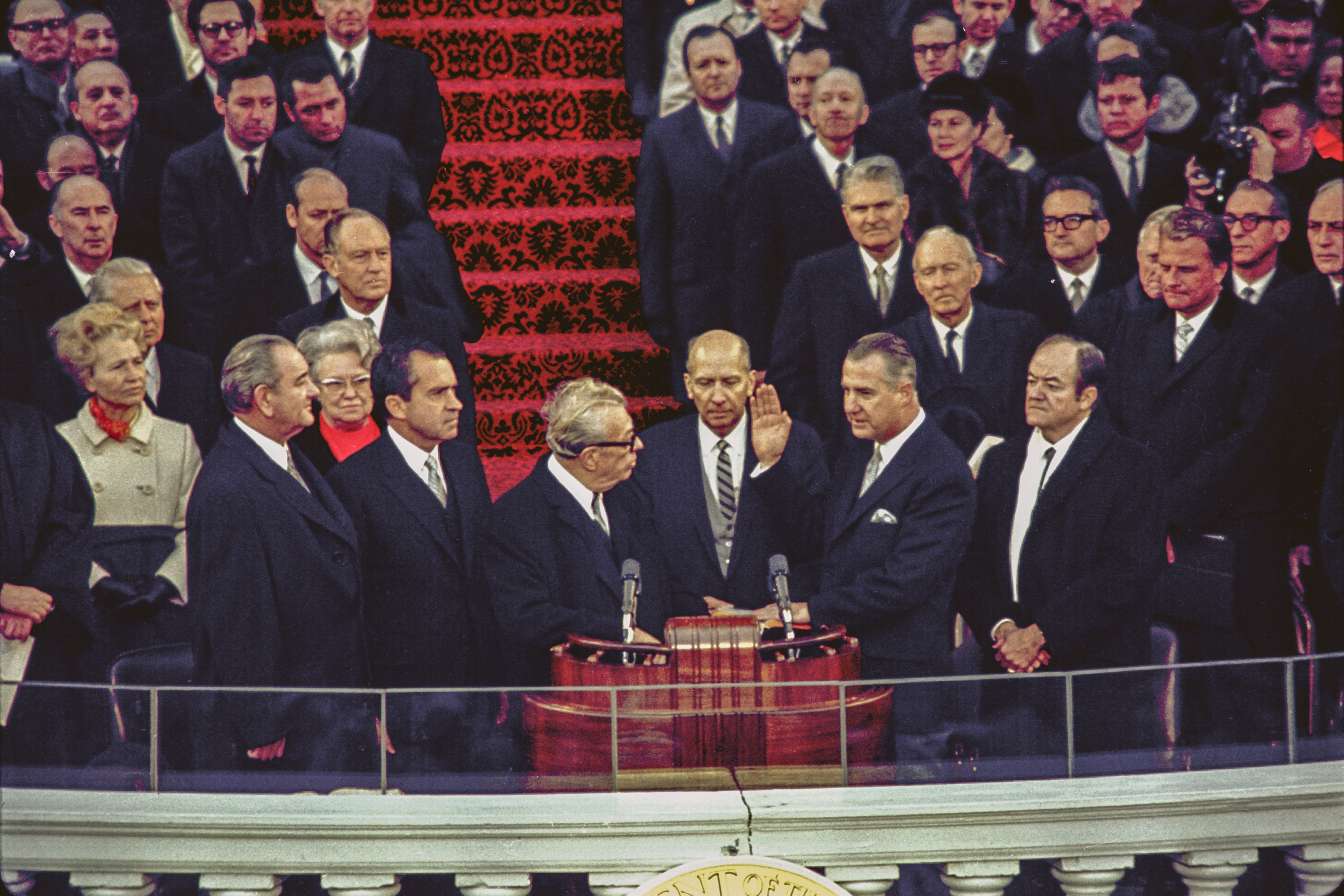
Senate minority leader Everett Dirksen administering the vice presidential oath of office to Spiro Agnew during the first inauguration of Richard Nixon; January 20, 1969

Of the 59 times the oath of office has been administered, 47 times have been at some location in the United States Capitol. The White House has seen 3 oaths of office, and Congress Hall in Philadelphia twice. The following locations all had the oath administered once in that location: Federal Hall, Old Brick Capitol, Havana, Cuba, a private residence in New York, and the Number One Observatory Circle. Reflecting the relative lack of importance of the office in the early 19th century, there are two instances where the location of the vice president's oath of office is unknown.

Due to Vice President-elect William R. King's deteriorating health, a bill signed on March 3, 1853, the last day of the 32nd United States Congress, allowed for the oath to be administered to him as he rested in Havana, Cuba. To date, King's swearing-in as vice president is the only occasion that either a vice presidential or presidential oath of office has been administered on foreign soil.

== Oath-taking ceremonies ==
Date	Vice President	No.	Location	Administered by
June 3, 1789 (Term began April 21)	John Adams	1st	Federal Hall; New York, New York	John Langdon; President pro tempore of the United States Senate
December 2, 1793 (Term began March 4)	John Adams	2nd	Congress Hall; Philadelphia, Pennsylvania	John Langdon; President pro tempore of the United States Senate
March 4, 1797	Thomas Jefferson	3rd	Congress Hall; Philadelphia, Pennsylvania	William Bingham; President pro tempore of the United States Senate
March 4, 1801	Aaron Burr	4th	Senate Chamber, United States Capitol	James Hillhouse; President pro tempore of the United States Senate
March 4, 1805	George Clinton	5th	Senate Chamber, United States Capitol	John Marshall; Chief Justice of the United States
March 4, 1809	George Clinton	6th	Unknown with no record given in the Journal of the Senate of the United States	Unknown
May 24, 1813 (Term began March 4)	Elbridge Gerry	7th	Appeared before the U.S. Senate on May 24, 1813, with a document stating the Vice President already "having taken the oath as prescribed by law"	John Davis; United States District Court Judge
March 4, 1817	Daniel D. Tompkins	8th	Senate Chamber, Old Brick Capitol	John Gaillard; President pro tempore of the United States Senate
March 3, 1821 (Term began March 4)	Daniel D. Tompkins	9th	Tompkins' Residence, Tompkinsville, Staten Island	William P. Van Ness; United States District Court Judge
March 4, 1825	John C. Calhoun	10th	Senate Chamber, United States Capitol	Andrew Jackson; U.S. Senator
March 4, 1829	John C. Calhoun	11th	Senate Chamber, United States Capitol	Samuel Smith; President pro tempore of the United States Senate
March 4, 1833	Martin Van Buren	12th	House Chamber, United States Capitol	John Marshall; Chief Justice of the United States
March 4, 1837	Richard Mentor Johnson	13th	Senate Chamber, United States Capitol	William R. King; President pro tempore of the United States Senate
March 4, 1841	John Tyler	14th	Senate Chamber, United States Capitol	William R. King; President pro tempore of the United States Senate
March 4, 1845	George M. Dallas	15th	Senate Chamber, United States Capitol	Willie Person Mangum; President pro tempore of the United States Senate
*March 5, 1849 (Term began March 4)	Millard Fillmore	16th	Senate Chamber, United States Capitol	David Rice Atchison; President pro tempore of the United States Senate
March 24, 1853 (Term began March 4)	William R. King	17th	Havana, Spanish Cuba	William L. Sharkey; U.S. Consul
March 4, 1857	John C. Breckinridge	18th	Senate Chamber, United States Capitol	James Murray Mason; President pro tempore of the United States Senate
March 2, 1861 (Term began March 4)	Hannibal Hamlin	19th	Senate Chamber, United States Capitol	John C. Breckinridge; Vice President of the United States
March 4, 1865	Andrew Johnson	20th	Senate Chamber, United States Capitol	Hannibal Hamlin; Vice President of the United States
March 4, 1869	Schuyler Colfax	21st	Senate Chamber, United States Capitol	Benjamin F. Wade; President pro tempore of the United States Senate
March 4, 1873	Henry Wilson	22nd	Senate Chamber, United States Capitol	Schuyler Colfax; Vice President of the United States
March 4, 1877	William A. Wheeler	23rd	Senate Chamber, United States Capitol	Thomas W. Ferry; President pro tempore of the United States Senate
March 4, 1881	Chester A. Arthur	24th	Senate Chamber, United States Capitol	William A. Wheeler; Vice President of the United States
March 4, 1885	Thomas A. Hendricks	25th	Senate Chamber, United States Capitol	George F. Edmunds; President pro tempore of the United States Senate
March 4, 1889	Levi P. Morton	26th	Senate Chamber, United States Capitol	John J. Ingalls; President pro tempore of the United States Senate
March 4, 1893	Adlai Stevenson	27th	Senate Chamber, United States Capitol	Levi P. Morton; Vice President of the United States
March 4, 1897	Garret Hobart	28th	Senate Chamber, United States Capitol	Adlai Stevenson; Vice President of the United States
March 4, 1901	Theodore Roosevelt	29th	Senate Chamber, United States Capitol	William P. Frye; President pro tempore of the United States Senate
March 4, 1905	Charles W. Fairbanks	30th	Senate Chamber, United States Capitol	William P. Frye; President pro tempore of the United States Senate
March 4, 1909	James S. Sherman	31st	Senate Chamber, United States Capitol	Charles W. Fairbanks; Vice President of the United States
March 4, 1913	Thomas R. Marshall	32nd	Senate Chamber, United States Capitol	Jacob H. Gallinger; President pro tempore of the United States Senate
March 4, 1917	Thomas R. Marshall	33rd	Senate Chamber, United States Capitol	Willard Saulsbury Jr. President pro tempore of the United States Senate
March 4, 1921	Calvin Coolidge	34th	Senate Chamber, United States Capitol	Thomas R. Marshall; Vice President of the United States
March 4, 1925	Charles G. Dawes	35th	Senate Chamber, United States Capitol	Albert B. Cummins; President pro tempore of the United States Senate
March 4, 1929	Charles Curtis	36th	Senate Chamber, United States Capitol	Charles G. Dawes; Vice President of the United States
March 4, 1933	John Nance Garner	37th	Senate Chamber, United States Capitol	Charles Curtis; Vice President of the United States
January 20, 1937	John Nance Garner	38th	United States Capitol	Joseph Taylor Robinson; U.S. Senator, Senate Majority Leader
January 20, 1941	Henry A. Wallace	39th	United States Capitol	John Nance Garner; Vice President of the United States
January 20, 1945	Harry S. Truman	40th	White House	Henry A. Wallace; Vice President of the United States
January 20, 1949	Alben W. Barkley	41st	United States Capitol	Stanley Forman Reed; Associate Justice of the Supreme Court of the United States
January 20, 1953	Richard Nixon	42nd	United States Capitol	William F. Knowland; U.S. Senator
*January 20, 1957	Richard Nixon	43rd	White House	William F. Knowland; U.S. Senator, Senate Minority Leader
January 20, 1961	Lyndon B. Johnson	44th	United States Capitol	Sam Rayburn; Speaker of the House of Representatives
January 20, 1965	Hubert Humphrey	45th	United States Capitol	John William McCormack; Speaker of the House of Representatives
January 20, 1969	Spiro Agnew	46th	United States Capitol	Everett Dirksen; U.S. Senator, Senate Minority Leader
January 20, 1973	Spiro Agnew	47th	United States Capitol	Warren E. Burger; Chief Justice of the United States
December 6, 1973	Gerald Ford	48th	House of Representatives Chamber, United States Capitol	Warren E. Burger; Chief Justice of the United States
December 19, 1974	Nelson Rockefeller	49th	Senate Chamber, United States Capitol	Warren E. Burger; Chief Justice of the United States
January 20, 1977	Walter Mondale	50th	United States Capitol	Tip O'Neill; Speaker of the House of Representatives
January 20, 1981	George H. W. Bush	51st	United States Capitol	Potter Stewart; Associate Justice of the Supreme Court of the United States
*January 20, 1985	George H. W. Bush	52nd	White House	Potter Stewart; Associate Justice of the Supreme Court of the United States
January 20, 1989	Dan Quayle	53rd	United States Capitol	Sandra Day O'Connor; Associate Justice of the Supreme Court of the United States
January 20, 1993	Al Gore	54th	United States Capitol	Byron White; Associate Justice of the Supreme Court of the United States
January 20, 1997	Al Gore	55th	United States Capitol	Ruth Bader Ginsburg; Associate Justice of the Supreme Court of the United States
January 20, 2001	Dick Cheney	56th	United States Capitol	William Rehnquist; Chief Justice of the United States
January 20, 2005	Dick Cheney	57th	United States Capitol	Dennis Hastert; Speaker of the House of Representatives
January 20, 2009	Joe Biden	58th	United States Capitol	John Paul Stevens; Associate Justice of the Supreme Court of the United States
*January 20, 2013	Joe Biden	59th	Number One Observatory Circle	Sonia Sotomayor; Associate Justice of the Supreme Court of the United States
January 20, 2017	Mike Pence	60th	United States Capitol	Clarence Thomas; Associate Justice of the Supreme Court of the United States
January 20, 2021	Kamala Harris	61st	United States Capitol	Sonia Sotomayor; Associate Justice of the Supreme Court of the United States
January 20, 2025	JD Vance	62nd	United States Capitol	Brett Kavanaugh; Associate Justice of the Supreme Court of the United States

Notes: Entries in the above list with an asterisk (*) indicate the official legal oath of office for terms of office that began on Sunday instead of the public ceremonial swearing-in the following day.

== Oath mishaps ==
- In 1953, Richard Nixon said "I, Richard M. Nixon, solemnly swear that I will defend the constitution of the United States against all enemies, foreign and domestic" He also said "that I will faithfully execute the office on which I am about to embark.
- In 1961, even though the oath was read correctly to him by Sam Rayburn, Lyndon B. Johnson replied "without any mental reservation whatever" instead of "without any mental reservation or purpose of evasion".
- In 1974, even though Warren E. Burger read the oath correctly, Gerald R. Ford said "of the office" twice, resulting in "and that I will well and faithfully discharge the duties of the office, off the office on which I am about to enter."
- In 1985, former Associate Justice Potter Stewart said "that I take this oath-- this obligation...freely". When George H. W. Bush was supposed to repeat, he said "That I take this obligation freely".
- In 1989 during Dan Quayle's swearing in, Supreme Court Justice Sandra Day O’Connor skipped the line “against all enemies, foreign and domestic.”
- In 1993, Associate Justice Byron White said "and that I will well and faithfully perform", instead of "and that I will well and faithfully discharge"
- In 2005, Speaker of the House Dennis Hastert said "that I will defend and support the constitution of the United States". Dick Cheney said the line correctly when he was supposed to repeat.
- In 2021, Supreme Court Justice Sonia Sotomayor mispronounced Kamala Harris's first name while administering the vice presidential oath. When Harris was to repeat the oath after the justice, she said her own name correctly and the rest of the oath continued as planned. Harris accepted Sotomayor's apology after the event.
