= Bring Us Together =

American political slogan

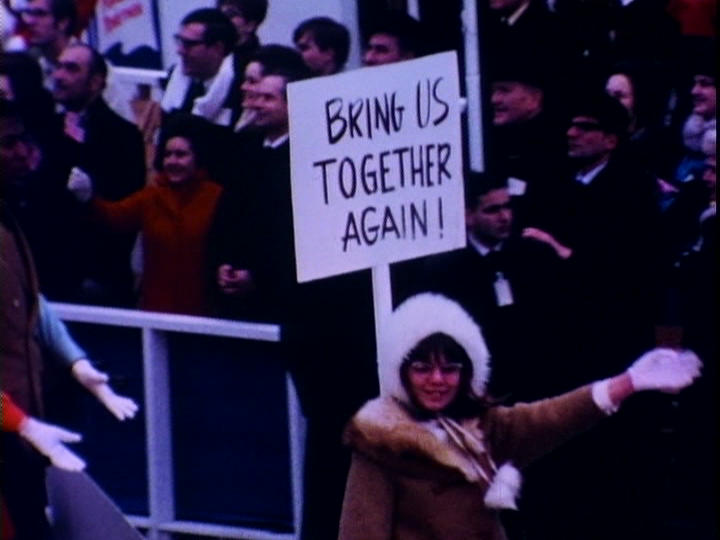
- Vicki Lynne Cole with a recreation of her sign at the 1969 inaugural parade
- Date: October 1968 – January 1969
- Location: Deshler, Ohio – Washington D.C.
- Participants: Vicki Lynne Cole, Richard Nixon
- Outcome: Slogan briefly adopted by Nixon administration, but later turned against it by Democrats

"Bring Us Together" was a political slogan popularized after the election of Republican candidate Richard Nixon as President of the United States in the 1968 election. The text was derived from a sign which 13-year-old Vicki Lynne Cole stated that she had carried at Nixon's rally in her hometown of Deshler, Ohio, during the campaign.

Richard Moore, a friend of Nixon, told the candidate's speechwriters he had seen a child carrying a sign reading "Bring Us Together" at the Deshler rally. The speechwriters, including William Safire, began inserting the phrase into the candidate's speeches. Nixon mentioned the Deshler rally and the sign in his victory speech on November 6, 1968, adopting the phrase as representing his administration's initial goal—to reunify the bitterly divided country. Cole came forward as the person who carried the sign and was the subject of intense media attention.

Nixon invited Cole and her family to the presidential inauguration, and she appeared on a float in the inaugural parade. The phrase "Bring Us Together" was used ironically by Democrats when Nixon proposed policies with which they disagreed or refused to support. Cole declined to comment on Nixon's 1974 resignation, but subsequently expressed sympathy for him. In newspaper columns written in his final years before his 2009 death, Safire expressed doubt that Cole's sign ever existed.

== Background ==
The 1968 presidential campaign was one of the most bitterly fought in the nation's history. Set among national divisions over the Vietnam War, social policy, and against the backdrop of riot and assassination, none of the campaigns made healing divisions a major theme—an early slogan by Democratic candidate Hubert Humphrey, "United With Humphrey" had been scrapped. The incumbent president, Democrat Lyndon Baines Johnson (often called L.B.J.) could give Humphrey little support because of his own unpopularity.

By 1968, candidates were appealing to the electorate through television, rather than through whistle-stop train tours. Nevertheless, Nixon had included them in his past national campaigns—he had broken off one such tour in 1952 to make the Checkers speech, and in 1960, had stopped at Deshler. The rural Ohio village, about 45 miles (72 km) southwest of Toledo, was popular among whistle-stopping presidential candidates as two main lines of the Baltimore & Ohio Railroad crossed there—other visitors in search of votes had included Al Smith, Harry Truman, and Barry Goldwater. Deshler voters would respond in 1968 by giving Nixon an overwhelming majority of their votes.

== Rally and sign ==
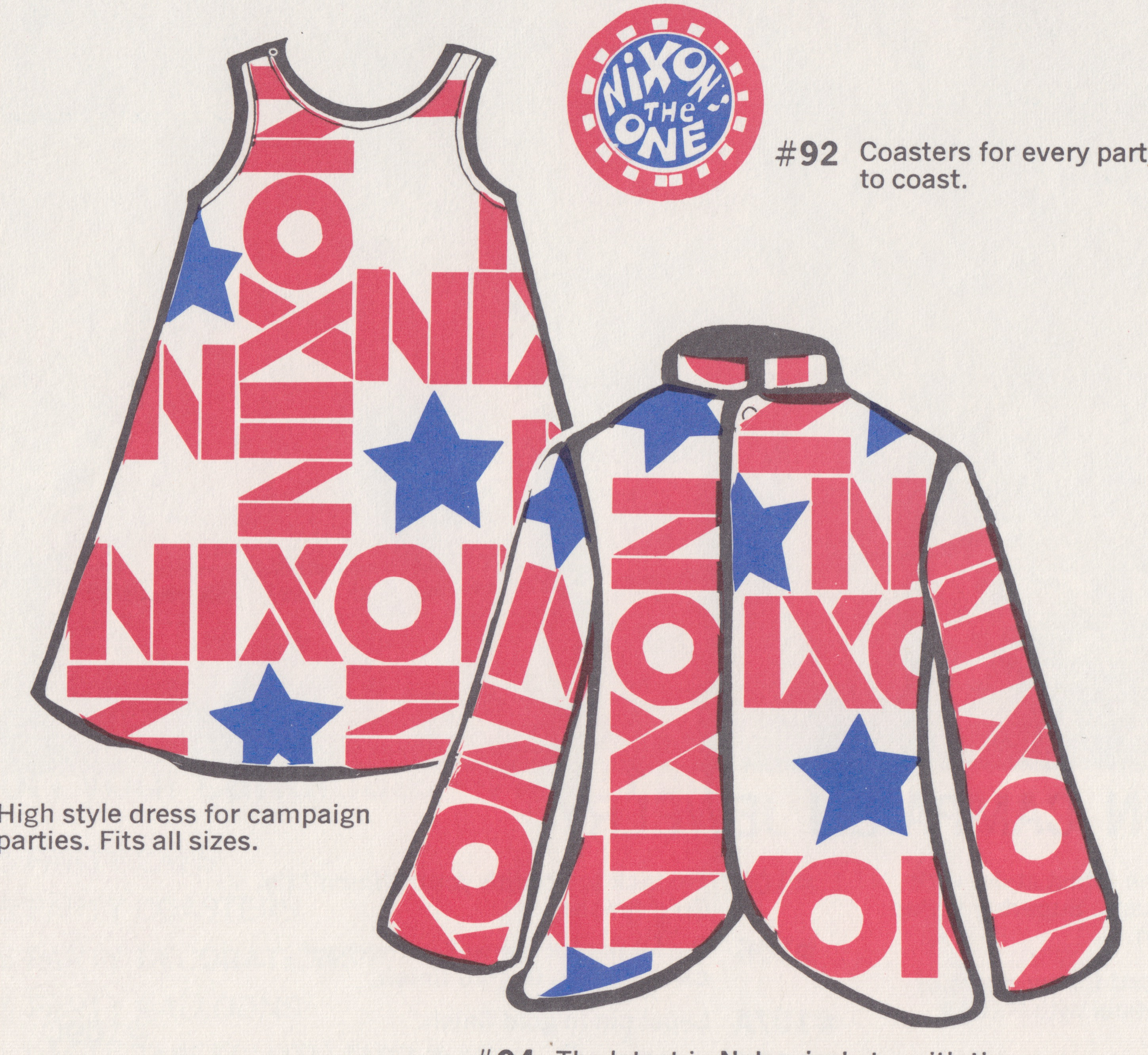
"Nixonette" dress (on left)

Vicki Cole was an eighth-grader in Deshler; her father was the local Methodist minister, while her mother taught third grade. On October 22, 1968, the day of Nixon's stop in Deshler, Cole attended class as usual. During the morning session, one of her teachers announced that any girls interested in being "Nixonettes" (girls asked to cheer and provide atmosphere at the rally) should report to the fire station after school. Cole did so, along with her friend, Rita Bowman, and the girls were provided with paper red, white, and blue dresses (to be worn over other clothing) and signs. Cole's sign read "L.B.J. Convinced Us—Vote Republican".

That afternoon, Cole attended the rally, wearing her dress and holding her sign. The Nixon train pulled in, and the police lowered the rope which kept the crowd clear of the tracks. In interviews, Cole related that as the crowd surged forward, she dropped her sign amidst the pushing and shoving. Cole stated, "I wanted a sign to wave. I had lost my own placard and as the crowd moved forward as the train approached I saw this sign lying in the street and I just picked it up and held it high, hoping Mr. Nixon would see it."

Nixon gave a speech from the rear platform of the train. He praised the size of the crowd, stating, "There are four times as many people here than live in the town and more than the number that were here in 1960." The candidate asserted that though his opponent, Vice President Humphrey, claimed that Americans had never had it so good, he should tell that to the farmer. Nixon pledged that he would give special attention to agricultural issues and would make the secretary of agriculture a farmer's advocate to the White House. He promised to restore order: "The most important civil right is the right to be free from [local] violence." He noted the many youths in the crowd, stating, "Young Americans know their future is at stake. They don't want four more years of the same." He recalled that his father had hailed from Ohio: "his roots are here and mine are too!" As Nixon spoke, Cole observed him and thought he was a good family man, looking warm and friendly and appearing much as she expected him to. She later stated that she did not even look at the sign until she was teased about it by a classmate, who suggested the sign, "Bring Us Together Again" was about boys, not politics. She kept the dress but told the media she threw away the sign. (Note: Nixon did not speak from a prepared text in Deshler; his campaign released a statement of themes Nixon intended to cover. According to the statement, Nixon was to discuss the number of various crimes that had been committed in the time it took his train to go from the previous stop (Lima) to Deshler. Richard Nixon Presidential Library and Museum, 1968 speech files, October 22 (Deshler).)

== Nixon speeches and inauguration ==
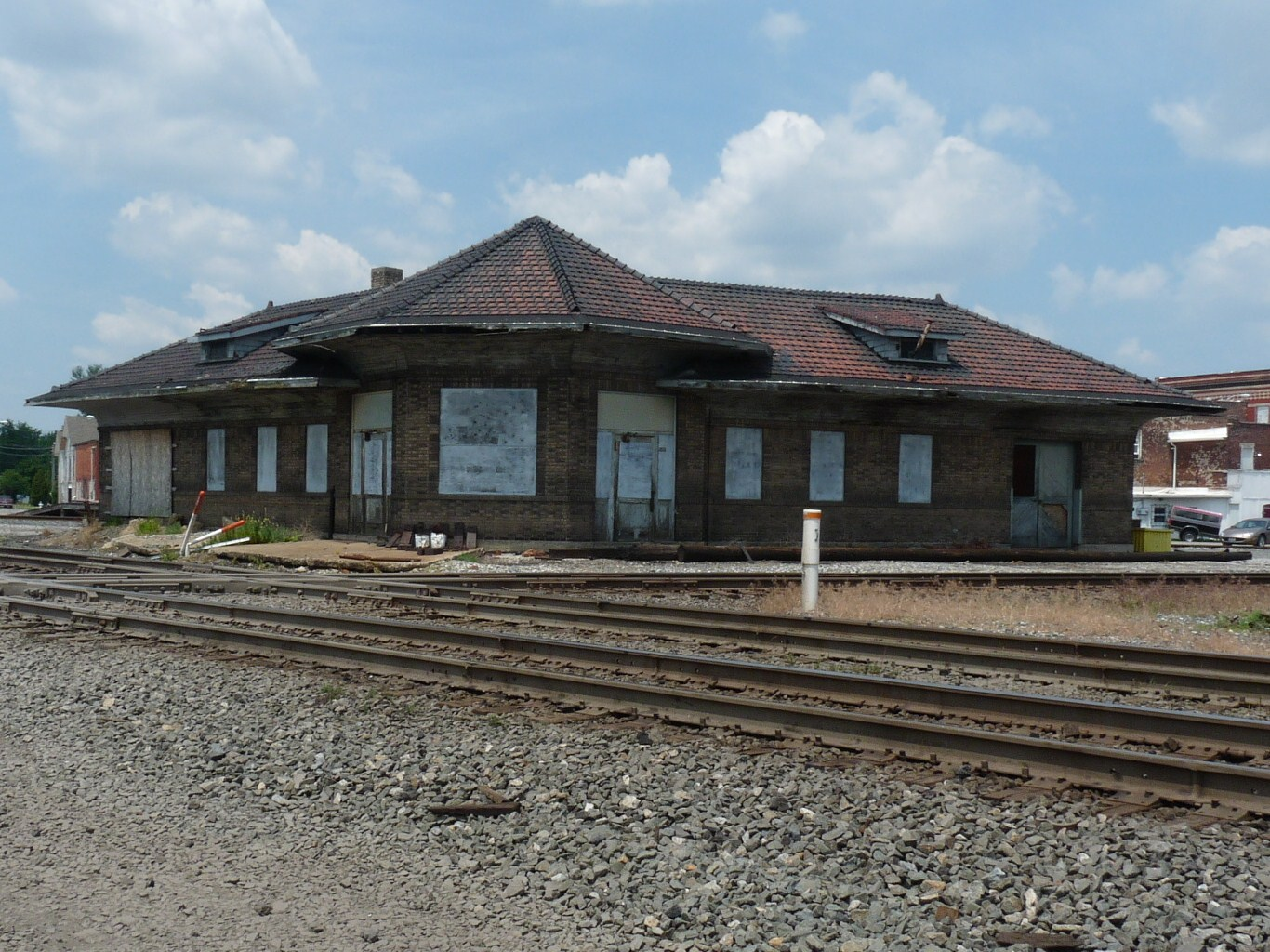
The Deshler railroad station, pictured in 2009

Nixon speechwriter William Safire had been told of the sign by a friend of the candidate, Richard Moore, who left the train at campaign stops to mingle with the crowd and seek items of local color for the speechwriters to use. Safire stated in his book on the early days of the Nixon administration (originally published in 1975) that at Deshler, "Moore boarded the train with that mystic look that a writer gets when he has something delicious to work with, some piece of color that could be more than a gimmick." According to Safire in a 2007 column, Moore stuck his head into the compartment occupied by Nixon's speechwriters and stated, "There's a little kid out there with a hand-lettered sign that I think says 'Bring Us Together'." Safire wrote in that column that he inserted the phrase into Nixon's remarks for the speech to be given at the next stop. (Note: The speech files at the Nixon Library do not show that Nixon used those words at the next stop, though he could have departed from his prepared text. At least one speech he gave the following day in Michigan was on the theme of unity, though no verbatim transcript is there, simply a statement of themes Nixon intended to discuss in his talk. Richard Nixon Presidential Library and Museum, 1968 speech files October 22 (Toledo), October 23.)

Nixon used the phrase in concluding a rally at New York's Madison Square Garden on October 31, 1968. Recalling the visit to Deshler, the Republican candidate stated, "There were many signs like those I see here. But one sign held by a teenager said, 'Bring Us Together Again'. My friends, America needs to be brought together." However, Nixon's use of the phrase received little coverage until after the election. Deshler school officials heard of the speech, and asked students about the sign, but no one came forward.

Safire included the incident in a draft victory statement, which Nixon looked at before addressing the nation as president-elect. In his victory speech on November 6, Nixon recalled the sign:

I saw many signs in this campaign, some of them were not friendly; some were very friendly. But the one that touched me the most was one that I saw in Deshler, Ohio, at the end of a long day of whistle-stopping. A little town. I suppose five times the population was there in the dusk. It was almost impossible to see, but a teenager held up a sign, "Bring Us Together." And that will be the great objective of this administration at the outset, to bring the American people together. (Note: Nixon's notes for this speech survive. They do not mention "Bring Us Together" but do mention his hopes of reuniting the country. Richard Nixon Presidential Library and Museum, 1968 speech files, November 6.)

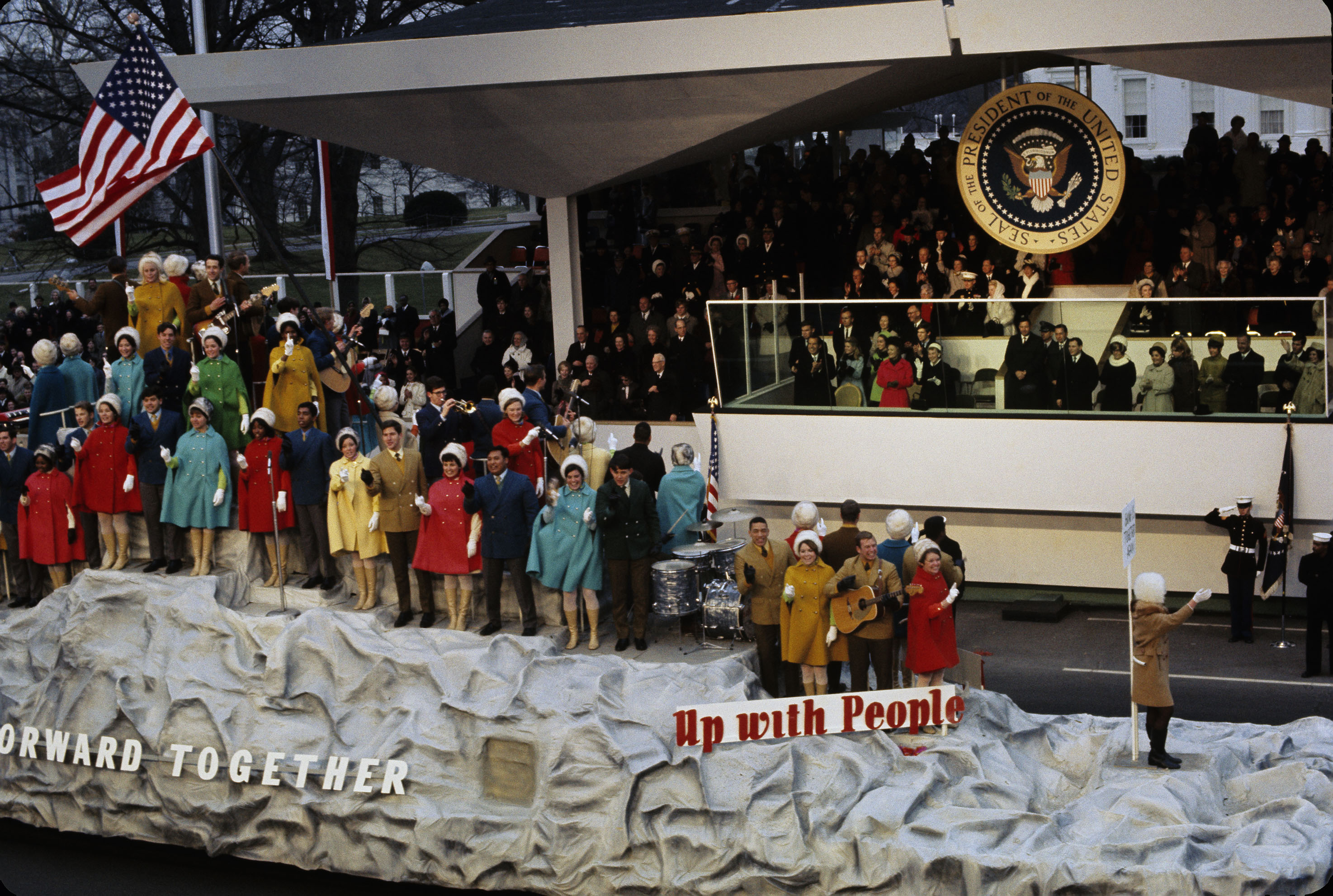
Vicki Lynne Cole (right) with her "Bring Us Together Again" sign on the "Forward Together" theme float

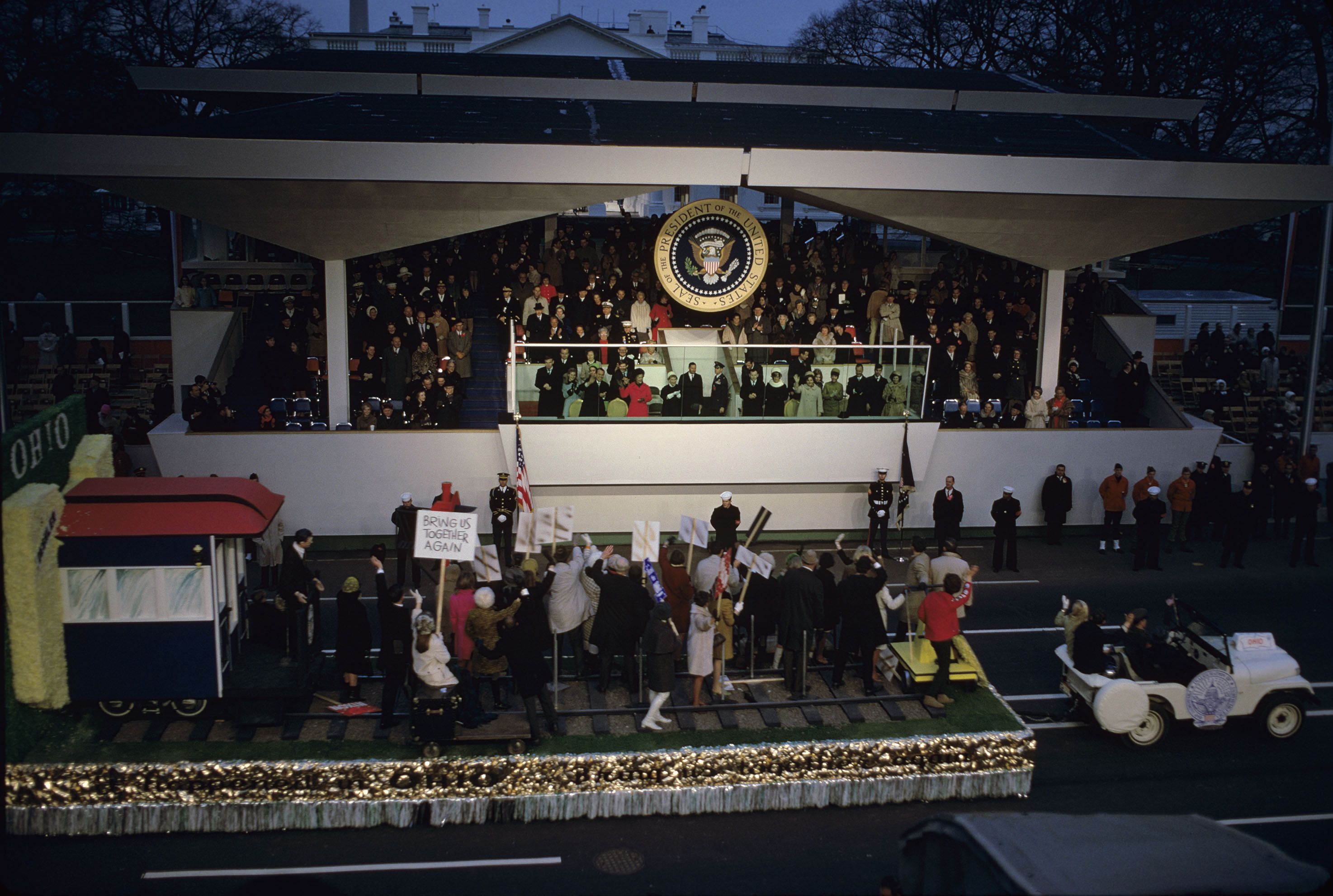
The Ohio float, recreating Nixon's visit to Deshler, passing by the presidential reviewing stand

Reconciliation among the American people was also a theme of Humphrey's concession statement. "I have done my best. I have lost, Mr. Nixon has won. The democratic process has worked its will, so now let's get on with the urgent task of uniting our country."

School officials again asked students about the sign after Nixon mentioned his visit to Deshler in the victory speech, and this time Cole came forward. She stated that she had not done so before as she had not written the sign. Reporters interviewed the girl in the principal's office. Cole stated she felt Nixon was the one who could bring the country together again. Being interviewed by reporters from Washington, New York, and Chicago, she indicated, was more fun than sitting in history class. The Toledo Blade investigated the matter, but could not ascertain who made the sign, or what happened to it after Cole discarded it. John Baer, village chief of police, stated, "I think this has to be the most important thing that has ever happened around here." Paul Scharf, editor of the Deshler Flag, stated he did not believe the mystery of the sign's origin or fate would ever be cleared up. Safire stated he was told by Moore that the sign stood out as obviously handmade and not produced by the local Nixon campaign.

As early as November 7, the Northwest Signal, local paper for nearby Napoleon, Ohio, reported that Deshler merchants were considering taking up a collection to send Cole to Washington; the following day the paper editorialized that she, along with whoever actually made the sign, be sent to Washington to see the inauguration. On November 19, 1968, campaign special assistant and longtime Nixon advisor Murray Chotiner proposed inviting the Cole family to the inauguration and having Vicki Cole ride the theme float. The President-elect subsequently invited the family to attend the inauguration; they were brought to Washington by the Inaugural Committee. Vicki Cole carried a recreation of her sign on the theme float in the inaugural parade.

Carla Garrity, a 14-year-old girl from Burbank, California, objected to Cole's invitation to the inauguration on the ground that Cole had done nothing to deserve it. In a letter to her congressman, Ed Reinecke, Garrity stated she had worked very hard for Nixon and other Republican candidates, "Therefore, I am very much against that 13-year old girl in Ohio who held up the sign 'Bring us Together' being invited to the inaugural. She didn't even read or write it!" Reinecke forwarded the letter to Nixon aide John Ehrlichman with the comment, "I suspect that Carla's reaction may be shared by other young people who worked in the Nixon campaign." Nixon assistant Charles E. Stuart replied to Reinecke, stating, "Vicki Lynne has been invited to the inauguration not because she carried the sign, or even because she made the sign, but rather because the sign which she did carry proved to be an inspiration to Mr. Nixon" and expressed his confidence the invitation would be well received by other young Nixon partisans.

== Political usage and aftermath ==
Vicki Cole holding her sign in the inaugural parade

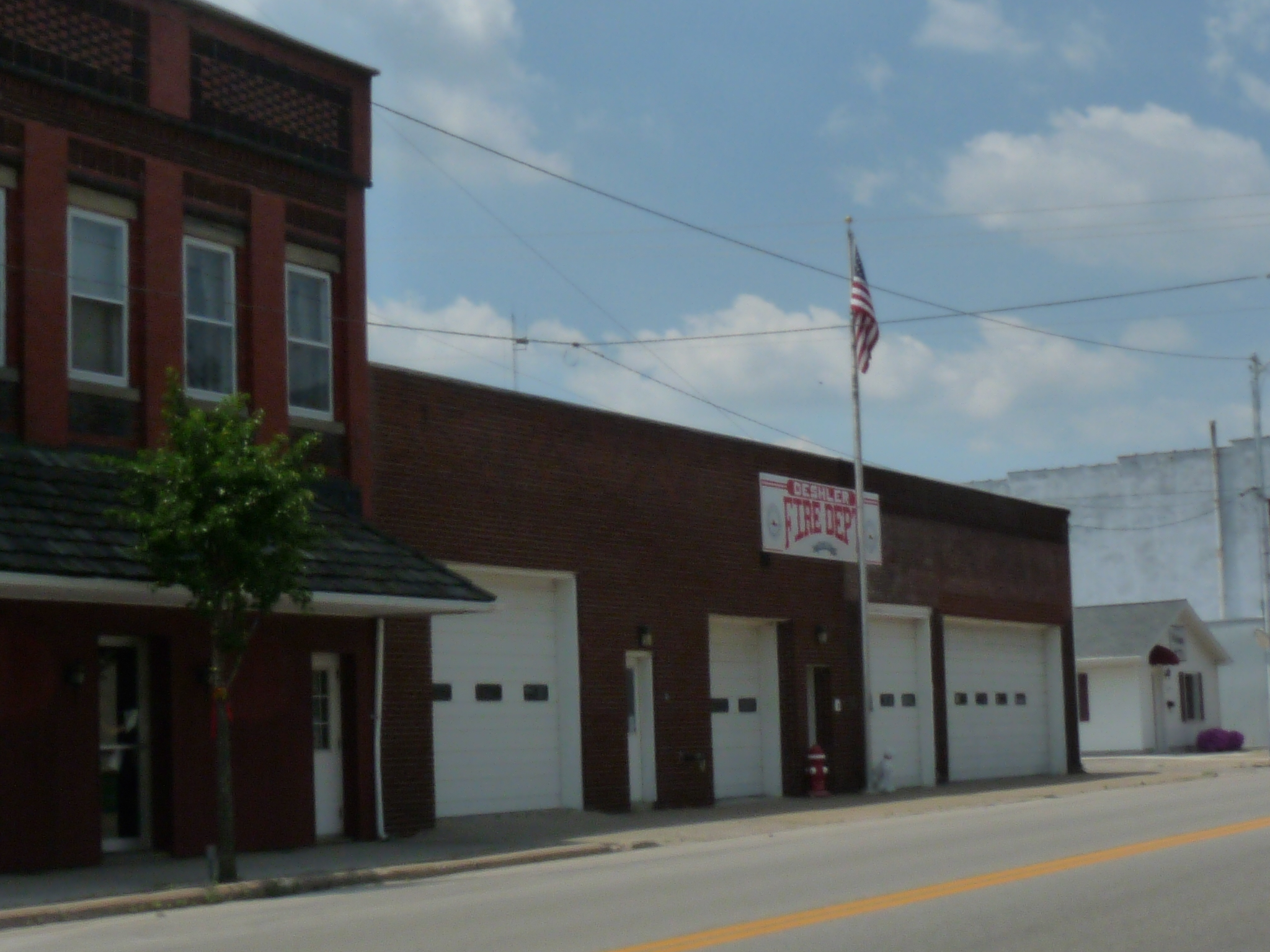
The fire department in Deshler, Ohio, where the "Nixonettes" assembled

The Inaugural Committee wanted to adopt "Bring Us Together" as the inaugural theme, appalling Safire, who said, "That wasn't the theme of the campaign." Safire and other aides felt the administration should seek to advance its agenda, rather than seeking consensus on policy, and White House Chief of Staff-designate H. R. Haldeman was able to change the theme to "Forward Together." Nevertheless, the phrase "Bring Us Together" was thrown in the face of the Nixon administration by Democrats each time something divisive was proposed, and was used as the title of a tell-all exposé by Leon Panetta after he was fired from the Nixon administration for dissenting from the White House's "Southern strategy" on civil rights policy. According to Safire, the use of the phrase against Nixon shows a slogan which evokes emotion can cut both ways.

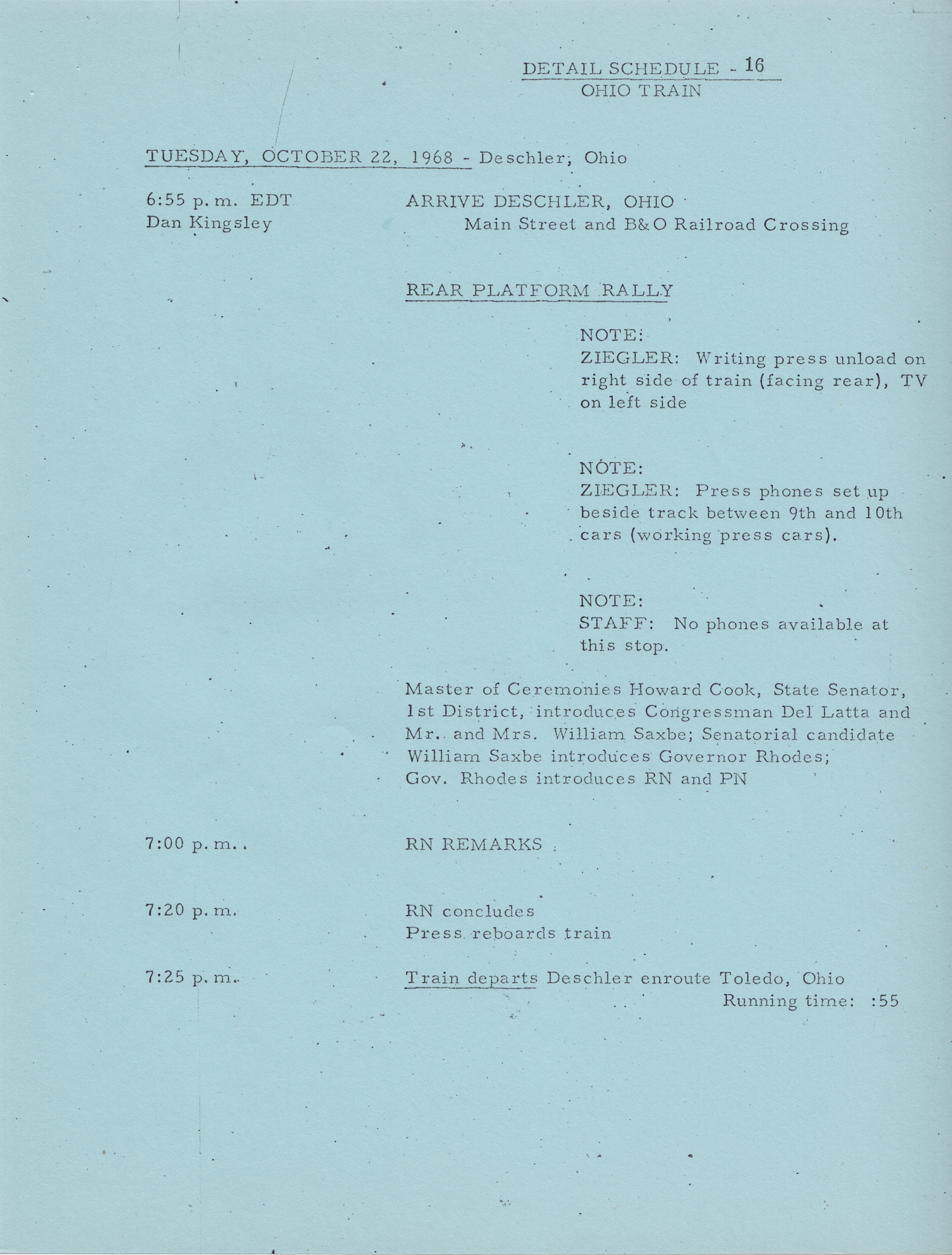
Nixon campaign schedule for the stop at "Deschler"

Nixon's advisors denied he had abandoned a desire to bring the American people together. However, they were divided between those who sought national unity, and those, such as campaign manager and Attorney General John N. Mitchell, who felt Nixon should concentrate on keeping the voters who had cast their ballots for him, and should seek to win over the voters who had favored third-party candidate Alabama Governor George Wallace, as the key to reelection in 1972. According to Safire, after taking office, Nixon and his advisors decided he need not bring the country together, but need only work to secure his reelection by appealing to voters who were not hostile to Nixon and his policies—they became known as the silent majority. Historian Stanley Kutler suggested in his book on the Nixon administration that Nixon's policies widened divisions in the US, but that the nation finally came together late in his presidency—to reject Nixon and demand his removal.

In a late 1970 interview, Vicki Lynn Cole indicated Nixon was doing the best he could. She volunteered as the Ohio chair of a future voters organization for the 1972 Nixon campaign, but the Watergate scandal swiftly ended her activism. She left politics, devoting her spare time to training and showing horses. In 1974, Cole declined to comment on the resignation of President Nixon in the wake of Watergate, but stated in 1977 that she was "disappointed, disillusioned" yet had some sympathy. Vicki stood by her choice in a 1984 interview, "I don't like politics". In a public comment regarding Nixon's death in 1994, Vicki noted his failure to "bring us together" the way his campaign promised: "when he left, we were more divided than ever".

Safire, in his political dictionary published in 2008, recollected that when he asked Moore, some years after the inauguration, whether he had really seen the girl holding the sign, or whether he had imagined it, "his eyes took on a faraway look". In columns written in the final years before his 2009 death, Safire commented that the sign was "almost too good to be true", and said of Moore, "[h]e may have made that up".
