= Deshler, Ohio =

- Village
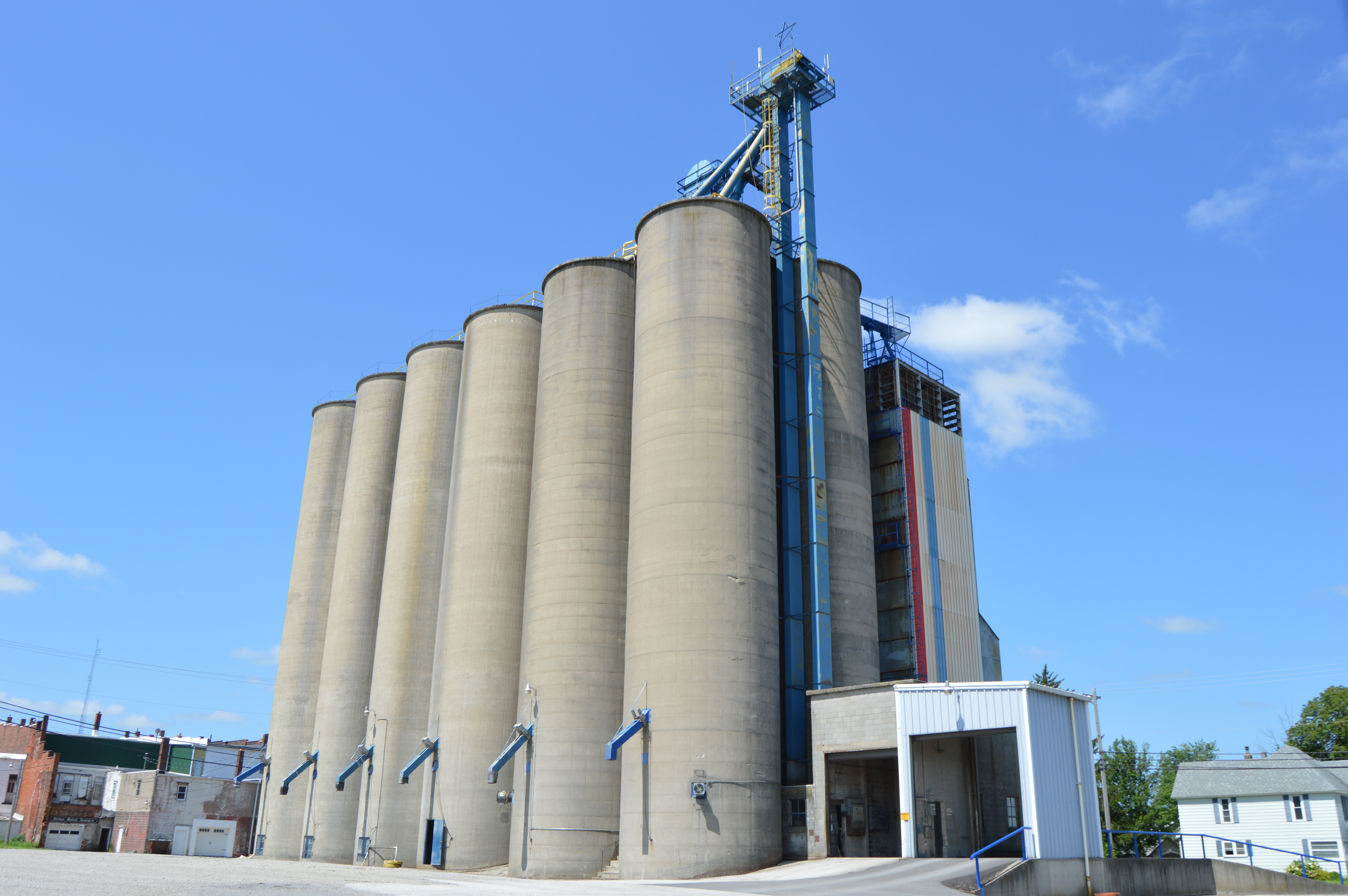
- Community grain elevator

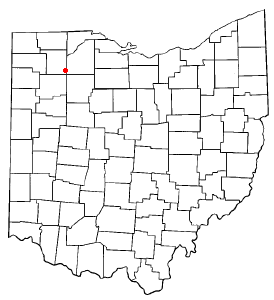
- Location of Deshler, Ohio

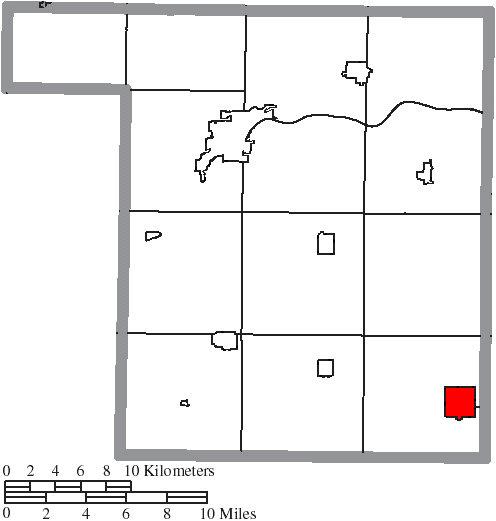
- Location of Deshler in Henry County
- Coordinates: 41°12′27″N 83°54′20″W
- Country: United States
- State: Ohio
- County: Henry

Government
  - Mayor: Stephen Gibson

Area
  - Total: 2.32 sq mi (6.02 km^{2})
  - Land: 2.29 sq mi (5.93 km^{2})
  - Water: 0.035 sq mi (0.09 km^{2})
- Elevation: 712 ft (217 m)

Population (2020)
  - Total: 1,588
  - Estimate (2023): 1,567
  - Density: 693.7/sq mi (267.83/km^{2})
- Time zone: UTC-5 (Eastern (EST))
  - Summer (DST): UTC-4 (EDT)
- ZIP code: 43516
- Area code: 419
- FIPS code: 39-21812
- GNIS feature ID: 2398716
- Website: https://villageofdeshler.com/

Deshler is a village in Henry County, Ohio, United States. The population was 1,588 at the 2020 census.

== History ==
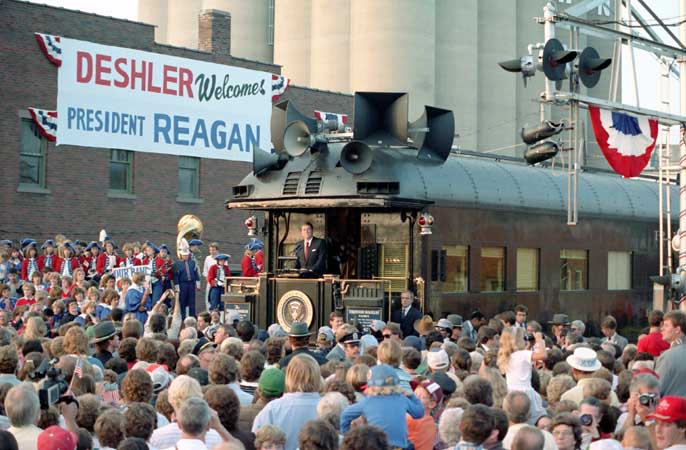
President Ronald Reagan visiting Deshler in 1984

Deshler was platted in 1873, and named for John G. Deshler, the original owner of the town site. A post office has been in operation at Deshler since 1872. The village was incorporated in 1876. Since the early 1900s the Baltimore and Ohio Railroad provided a large economic presence. Deshler, once called "The Crossroads of the B&O," was where the B&O's Detroit/Toledo to Cincinnati line crossed the very busy Chicago to Washington, D.C., mainline. Today, CSX Transportation owns and operates both lines.

== Geography ==
According to the United States Census Bureau, the village has a total area of 2.30 square miles (5.96 km^{2}), of which 2.26 square miles (5.85 km^{2}) is land and 0.04 square miles (0.10 km^{2}) is water.

Deshler's street pattern is laid out around the railroad line.

CSX Transportation owns two lines (formerly Baltimore and Ohio and Chessie System), which run through the community, hosting approximately 50 to 70 trains daily and are popular among train enthusiasts. A YouTube channel called Virtual Railfan operates a continuous live webcast from the "diamond" intersection; trains may also be observed from "Crossroads Park". The old depot that once stood on the site was demolished on Thursday, August 11, 2022.

== Demographics ==
Historical population
Census	Pop.	Note	%±
1880	752		—
1890	1,114		48.1%
1900	1,628		46.1%
1910	1,515		−6.9%
1920	1,514		−0.1%
1930	1,538		1.6%
1940	1,570		2.1%
1950	1,623		3.4%
1960	1,824		12.4%
1970	1,938		6.3%
1980	1,870		−3.5%
1990	1,876		0.3%
2000	1,831		−2.4%
2010	1,799		−1.7%
2020	1,588		−11.7%
2023 (est.)	1,567	▼	−1.3%
U.S. Decennial Census

=== 2010 census ===
As of the census of 2010, there were 1,799 people, 678 households, and 485 families living in the village. The population density was 796.0 inhabitants per square mile (307.3/km^{2}). There were 771 housing units at an average density of 341.2 per square mile (131.7/km^{2}). The racial makeup of the village was 91.9% White, 0.1% African American, 0.3% Native American, 0.4% Asian, 4.4% from other races, and 2.8% from two or more races. Hispanic or Latino of any race were 9.9% of the population.

There were 678 households, of which 37.6% had children under the age of 18 living with them, 51.6% were married couples living together, 12.4% had a female householder with no husband present, 7.5% had a male householder with no wife present, and 28.5% were non-families. 25.1% of all households were made up of individuals, and 11.8% had someone living alone who was 65 years of age or older. The average household size was 2.60 and the average family size was 3.04.

The median age in the village was 36.5 years. 28.8% of residents were under the age of 18; 6.5% were between the ages of 18 and 24; 26.5% were from 25 to 44; 23.1% were from 45 to 64; and 14.9% were 65 years of age or older. The gender makeup of the village was 49.5% male and 50.5% female.

=== 2000 census ===
As of the census of 2000, there were 1,831 people, 702 households, and 504 families living in the village. The population density was 808.8 inhabitants per square mile (312.3/km^{2}). There were 755 housing units at an average density of 333.5 per square mile (128.8/km^{2}). The racial makeup of the village was 93.99% White, 0.11% African American, 0.44% Native American, 0.76% Asian, 3.22% from other races, and 1.47% from two or more races. Hispanic or Latino of any race were 6.88% of the population.

There were 702 households, out of which 34.6% had children under the age of 18 living with them, 57.5% were married couples living together, 8.7% had a female householder with no husband present, and 28.1% were non-families. 24.8% of all households were made up of individuals, and 13.1% had someone living alone who was 65 years of age or older. The average household size was 2.55 and the average family size was 3.02.

In the village, the population was spread out, with 27.0% under the age of 18, 8.6% from 18 to 24, 27.4% from 25 to 44, 20.1% from 45 to 64, and 16.9% who were 65 years of age or older. The median age was 35 years. For every 100 females there were 101.0 males. For every 100 females age 18 and over, there were 89.4 males.

The median income for a household in the village was $36,897, and the median income for a family was $44,145. Males had a median income of $31,360 versus $23,810 for females. The per capita income for the village was $16,639. About 5.6% of families and 7.5% of the population were below the poverty line, including 9.3% of those under age 18 and 4.3% of those age 65 or over.

== Education ==
Public education for the village is administered by the Patrick Henry Local School District.

== Notable people ==
- Vicki Lynne Cole, teenage girl who gained unexpected fame after 1968 Richard Nixon Presidential campaign
- Jerry Fosnow, professional baseball player
- Marc Krauss, professional baseball player
- Harold McMaster, scientist and inventor
- Rich Reese, professional baseball player and CEO of Jim Beam Brands
- Willard Rhodes, ethnomusicologist
