= Presidential transition of Richard Nixon =

Transfer of presidential power from Lyndon B. Johnson to Richard Nixon

- President Johnson and President-elect Nixon at the White House, prior to Nixon's inauguration
- Election date: November 5, 1968
- Transition start: November 6, 1968
- Inauguration date: January 20, 1969
- President-elect: Richard Nixon (Republican)
- Vice president-elect: Spiro Agnew (Republican)
- Outgoing president: Lyndon B. Johnson (Democrat)
- Outgoing vice president: Hubert Humphrey (Democrat)
- Headquarters: The Pierre in New York City
- Leader of the transition: Franklin B. Lincoln Jr.

The presidential transition of Richard Nixon began when he won the 1968 United States presidential election, becoming the president-elect, and ended when Nixon was inaugurated on January 20, 1969. Nixon had become president-elect once the election results became clear on November 6, 1968, the day after the election. This was the first presidential transition to take place following the passage of the Presidential Transition Act of 1963.

Preparations for a transition were begun by the administration of outgoing president Lyndon B. Johnson many months before the election. Planning for a potential transition into the presidency was also begun by then-candidate Nixon in the months ahead of his election. Nixon's pre-election and post-election transition efforts were headed by Franklin B. Lincoln Jr., and Johnson's were headed by Charles S. Murphy.

At the time of the transition, the United States was engaged in the ongoing Vietnam War, and peace talks with North Vietnam were ongoing.

== Pre-election developments ==
A presidential transition was guaranteed to occur in 1968 after incumbent president Lyndon B. Johnson announced on March 31, 1968 that he had decided against seeking reelection. In November 1968, the Associated Press observed that more advance planning had been taken for the 1968-69 presidential transition than any previous transition.

Johnson made it known early into the presidential campaign series that he would actively make information on national interests available to the candidates, telling the press that he would provide them with intelligence briefings on the state of international affairs. Such intelligence briefings had some precedent, with candidates secretly receiving briefings amid World War II. Additionally, President Dwight D. Eisenhower, during the 1960 presidential election had publicly committed to provide some briefings to candidates. On May 15, Johnson had the under secretary of state begin providing State Department, Pentagon, and CIA briefings to all of the major candidates for the presidency.

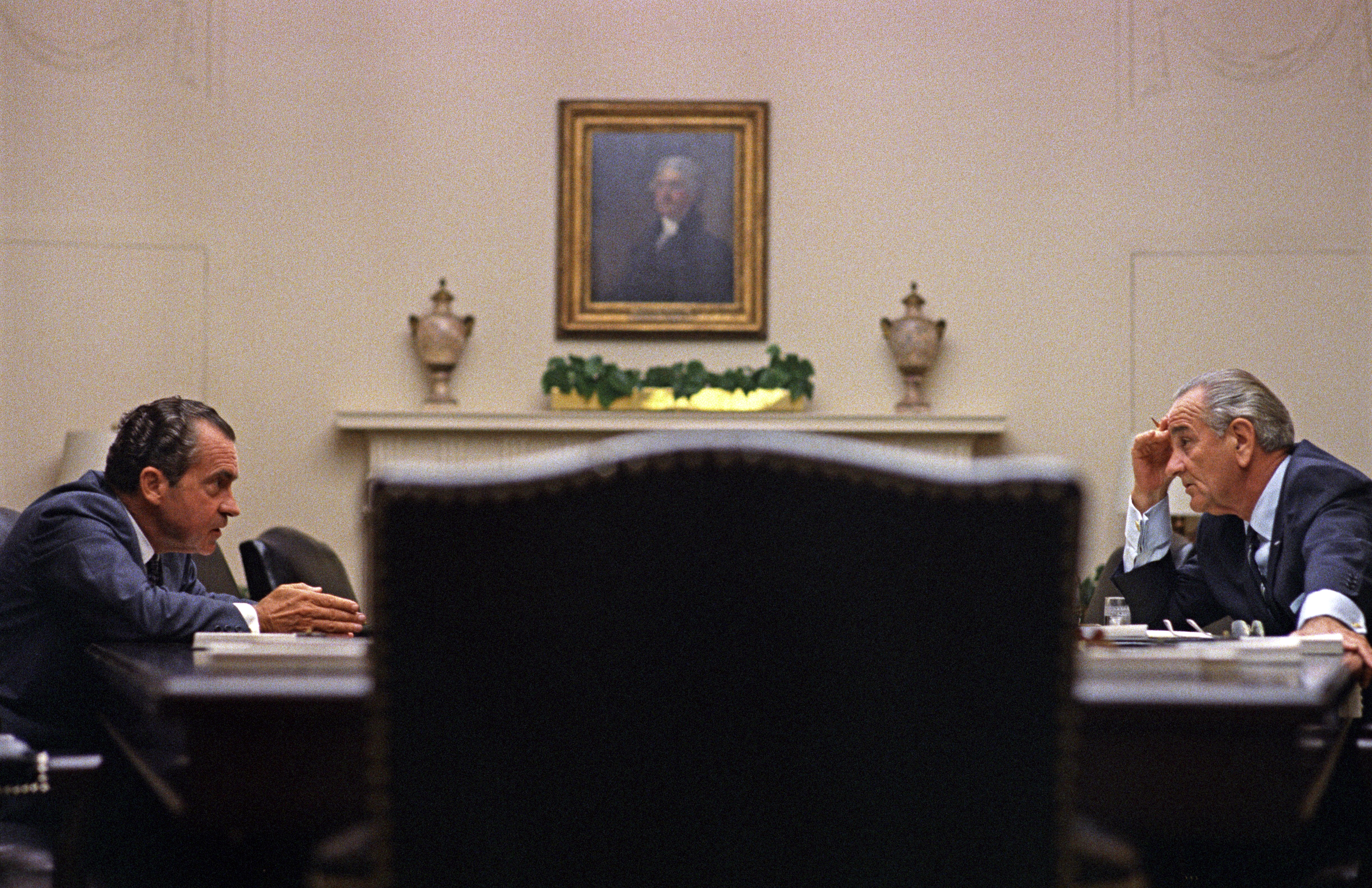
Then-candidate Nixon meets with President Johnson at the White House in July 1968.

Johnson began planning for a presidential transition in the summer of 1968. He produced a number of briefing books for the next presidential administration. On July 26, he invited likely Republican Party nominee Nixon and American Independent Party nominee George Wallace to the White House for personal consultations (the Democratic Party nominee was not yet decided). This was the first time that a president had held such meetings with opposition party candidates. During the 1952 presidential election, Democratic president Harry S. Truman had invited Republican nominee Dwight D. Eisenhower to such a meeting with him, but Eisenhower declined his invitation.

Transition planning began at agencies ahead of the election. For instance, the Bureau of the Budget had instructed vision heads in the spring of 1968 to begin collecting material that could be helpful to advise the president-elect during their transition.

In September, after all the major nominees were decided (following Hubert Humphrey winning the Democratic Party nomination at the Democratic National Convention, and Nixon being formally nominated at the Republican National Convention), Johnson appointed Charles S. Murphy as his transition officer, putting him in charge of heading his administration's role in the pending transition. He would be a liaison to representatives of the election's three major presidential candidates (Humphrey, Nixon, and Wallace) in planning for their prospective transitions. Johnson also, at the same time, invited all three major candidates to appoint representatives to consult with his presidential administration in regards to transition planning.

Johnson set aside, furnished, and equipped 50 rooms of office space in two executive office buildings near the White House to be made available after the election to the victor's transition team.

Johnson also directed department and agency heads to assign a senior official to develop transition plans fit to the needs of their department or agency. He also tasked each department and agency with the task of preparing briefing books that would be useful for incoming officials, and to later brief the incoming management of their department of agency during the transition,. During the official transition, as appointees were made, the prepared briefing books would be provided to them by their outgoing counterparts at their first meetings.

Johnson, while wanting his vice-president, Hubert Humphrey, to win the election, expressed to confidants his desire to have a warm relationship and transition with Nixon if he were to win.

Nixon's own transition planning began weeks prior to the election. Franklin B. Lincoln Jr. headed this effort. The Nixon transition planning effort had a component that consisted of task forces that would create new ideas and insights to shape policies and programs of Nixon's administration. This effort had begun as soon as Nixon was nominated for president by the Republican Party. There were 21 task forces, and this whole effort was overseen by Paul McCracken. Lincoln would, during the official transition, confirm that he had begun talking with Charles S. Murphy about coordinating the transition with the Johnson administration three weeks prior to the election. Additionally, in the last weeks before the election, Nixon and his campaign's chief of staff, H. R. Haldeman, began looking at White House structures and procedures, with Haldeman reading several books on the operations of White House staffs. During the pre-election planning, businessman Ross Perot made several researchers available to Nixon. Nixon also had a personnel-focused component of his transition preparations. Nixon and Haldeman also consulted with those well-versed on inner workings of White House staffs, such as Andrew Goodpaster and Bryce Harlow. They also consulted with a study group at the Harvard Institute of Politics headed by Franklin Lindsay which was analyzing presidential transitions. In October, the media reported that a Nixon aide had been, since May, conducting interviews with hundreds of businessmen, labor leaders, non-governmental experts, and professors since May for the ostensible purposes of finding policy ideas, but with the implicit purpose of scouting potential administration appointees. Nixon's pre-election transition preparations were made more public than those of Hubert Humphrey.

Johnson, throughout the campaign, continued to provide the three major candidates with briefings, and Johnson personally remained in touch with each of the three candidates. When, in the closing week of the election campaign, Johnson decided to cease the bombing of North Vietnam in order to facilitate serious forthcoming peace negotiations in Paris, he informed all three candidates on a conference call.

Two weeks before the election, Director of the Bureau of the Budget Charles Zwick sent a memorandum to all department heads urging them to be, "considerate of possible needs of the incoming administration, leaving to them decisions on moves, purchases, and other actions that can be delayed, so that such action can be tailored as closely as possible to the new administration's policies and programs."

== Official transition ==
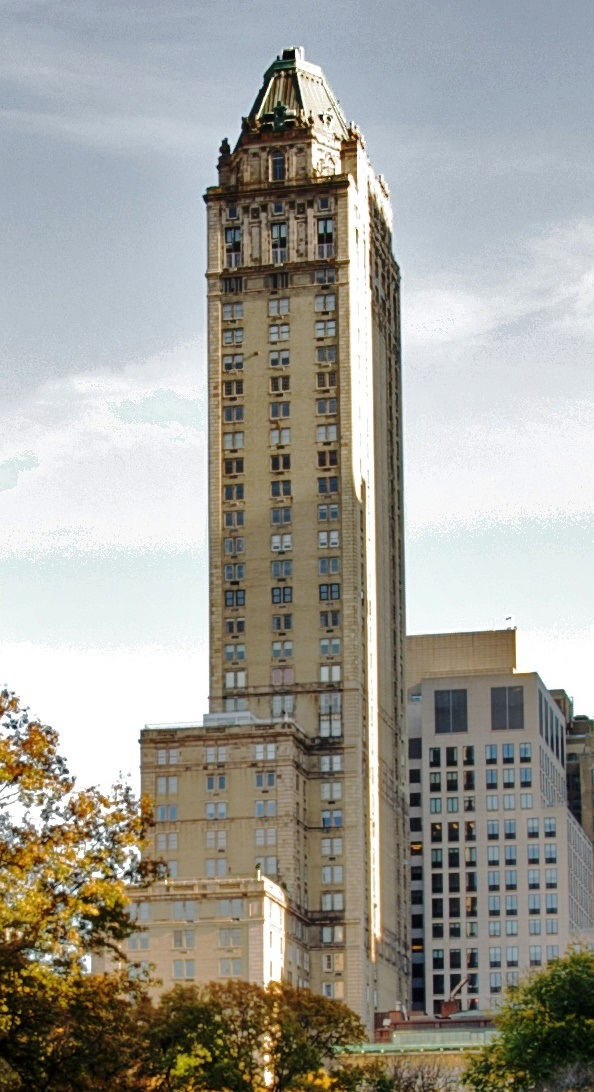
Nixon headquartered his transition at The Pierre hotel in New York City.

After the election, Nixon's transition effort continued to be headed by Franklin B. Lincoln Jr.

Nixon headquartered his transition in a small suite of offices at The Pierre hotel in New York City. The Pierre had the advantage of being near to both Nixon's personal residence and the former headquarters for the presidential campaign. Nixon had opted to headquarter it in a small suite of offices at the New York hotel over the space in Washington, D.C. that Johnson had previously prepared, before the election, for use by the president-elect. However, Nixon's transition made use of that Washington, D.C. office space for some advance team staff and lower-level transition workers. It was utilized by Pierre Hotel-based higher-ups of the transition team as a working space during visits to Washington, D.C. Nixon used it briefly on his visits to Washington, D.C. during the transition period.

Nixon and the outgoing administration of Lyndon B. Johnson each received $450,000 from the federal government to fund the transition, as allotted by the Presidential Transition Act of 1963. Nixon's was the first transition to receive federal funding. While the act did not specify how the $900,000 for transitions was to specifically be divided, Johnson decided that $375,000 each would go to the outgoing and incoming president, and $75,000 each would go to the outgoing and incoming vice presidents. In addition to these funds, Nixon also utilized privately-raised funds.

Nixon was provided with government services, such as communications, planes, and Secret Service protection, during the transition.

Top advisors of Nixon during his transition included Robert Finch, H. R. Haldeman, Bryce Harlow, and John N. Mitchell.

=== Role of the outgoing Johnson administration ===
After it became clear that Nixon had won the election, Johnson sent him a congratulations, and Nixon cordially replied. Additionally, Humphrey had an exchange with Nixon.

Johnson was amicable towards Nixon during the transition, despite being privately aware that, as a presidential candidate, Nixon had been involved in an effort to sabotage Johnson's Vietnamese peace talks. Nixon suggested to the press, and soon after directly to Johnson, that he expected that, in his lame duck period, that Johnson would consult Nixon on significant matters, a notion that Johnson found disagreeable. Johnson made it clear that the nation would only have one president at a time. Johnson made this clear to the press as well.

Shortly after the election, Humphrey and Nixon met with one another in Florida. The meeting has been described as having been friendly.

On November 7, Franklin B. Lincoln Jr. met with Charles S. Murphy at the White House to discuss plans for the transition.

On November 11 (six days after the election), Nixon and his wife Pat joined Johnson and his wife Lady Bird at the White House. The couples first had a lunch together. Johnson then had a private discussion with Nixon. Nixon spoke both with Johnson and others that day about the prospects of a peace agreement in Vietnam. Nixon also had a conference with top officials of Johnson's administration during this White House visit. Johnson and Nixon also held a joint press conference.

Johnson made available to Nixon use of the presidential aircraft. Nixon's advisers were granted office space across the road from the White House, access to the White House telephone switchboard, and automobiles.

Johnson had also offered Nixon that he would brief incoming Cabinet secretaries.

During the transition, Johnson's administration prepared files to be transferred to the offices in Austin, Texas that Johnson would utilize until the completion of both the Lyndon B. Johnson School of Public Affairs and the Lyndon B. Johnson Presidential Library at the University of Texas, which would house his White House documents.

The lame duck Johnson administration took a number of actions that they hoped would secure the continuation of some of Johnson's Great Society policies. For instance, they worked to get Congress to pass a statement that about the nation's ten-year housing goals in order to corner Nixon's administration into having to make an active decision as to whether or not they'd stay committed to the goals of the Housing and Urban Development Act of 1968. In 1968, administrators gave increased amounts of federal funds to the Model Cities Program in hopes that these funds could help the program survive if Nixon cut its funding once taking office.

=== Ongoing Vietnamese peace talks ===
On November 10, Nixon met with United States Ambassador to South Vietnam Henry Cabot Lodge Jr. (who had previously been Nixon's own vice presidential running mate in the 1960 election) to discuss Vietnam and peace talks. On November 11, Nixon met with Johnson and others to discuss to potential for a peace agreement in Vietnam. Johnson and Nixon were able to agree on a plan in which the Johnson administration would consult with Nixon so that the Johnson administration could continue the peace negotiations that were ongoing with public assurance of backing from the incoming Nixon administration. Nixon appointed Robert Daniel Murphy his liaison to the Department of State during the transition.

On December 5, Nixon met with W. Averell Harriman, the chief United States negotiator in the ongoing Vietnamese peace talks.

On January 6, Nixon announced that Lodge would be replacing Harriman as Chief U.S. Negotiator for Vietnamese peace talks once Nixon took office.

This would be the last presidential transition to occur while the United States was at war until the 2008–2009 presidential transition of Barack Obama.

=== Activities of Nixon ===
Early in his transition, Nixon spent time both vacationing and holding meetings with aides at a house he had rented from George Smathers in Biscayne Bay, Florida. On November 8, three days after the election, Nixon had an informal meeting with his close advisors discussing the transition, and the next day he met with Vice President-elect Spiro Agnew to discuss what responsibilities Angew would have in the administration. On November 13, Nixon declared plans to restructure the White House staff.

On November 29, Nixon sent William Scranton to the Middle East on a fact finding mission; Scranton would meet with Nixon on December 13, after returning from the Middle East.

Soon after winning the election, it was announced by Nixon press spokesman Ronald Ziegler that Nixon's selections for his Cabinet would not be announced any earlier than December 5 (on which day Nixon announced that he had gotten retiring chief justice of the Supreme Court of the United States Earl Warren to agree to continue on the court until June 1969, in order to provide Nixon with more time to select a successor). On December 12, Nixon took to national radio and television to announce Cabinet picks, and met with President Johnson to discuss the situation in the Middle East.

On December 14, Nixon spoke with Israeli Defense Minister Moshe Dayan, and the next day Nixon met with Republican congressional leaders to discuss plans for legislation over the coming year. On the 16th, Nixon announced that he would retain J. Edgar Hoover as director of the FBI and Richard Helms as director of the CIA, and on the 17th Nixon visited with Secretary General of the United Nations U Thant and other officials of the United Nations.

On December 22, the president-elect walked his daughter Julie down the aisle as she married David Eisenhower in New York City.

=== Activities of Spiro Agnew ===
It was reported, days into the transition, that there had been very little communication between Nixon and Vice President-elect Spiro Agnew, who outlets noted had not received any mention in Nixon's election victory speech. Agnew would, soon after these reports, meet with Nixon after the election in Biscayne Bay. However, Agnew would not be heavily involved in the transition, and would not even be invited to visit the transition's New York City headquarters until November 27. Instead, during the transition, Agnew partook in numerous activities. He vacationed on Saint Croix, where he played a round of golf with outgoing vice president (and Nixon's election opponent) Hubert Humphrey and Edmund Muskie, who had been Humphrey's running mate. Agnew went to Memphis for the 1968 Liberty Bowl, and to New York to attend the wedding of Nixon's daughter Julie to David Eisenhower. Agnew was a fan of the Baltimore Colts and, in January, was the guest of team owner Carroll Rosenbloom at Super Bowl III.

=== Selection of appointees ===
Nixon and his closest advisors focused on choosing the staff for Cabinet and major Executive Office and White House positions, while staff assistants handled reviewing candidates and selecting picks for the rest of the roughly 2,000 positions that Nixon would be able to make appointments to. The personnel search component of the transition had a peak staff of between 125 and 150 people. Nixon involved himself personally in the selection of individuals for cabinet-level positions.

An effort was made to have a broad pool of candidates for positions in the Nixon administration. Nixon's transition became the first to employ a professional recruiter.

Because he had only won a narrow victory in the popular vote, Nixon felt that he needed to make some Cabinet appointments that would signal unity. He had also made a campaign promise to consider Democrats for his Cabinet. He sought a number out, but those he asked to join his Cabinet rejected the offer. Nixon publicly disclosed, during the transition, that his election opponent, Hubert Humphrey, had declined an offer to serve as United States Ambassador to the United Nations. Nixon also saw Henry M. Jackson decline an offer to serve as secretary of defense. Per the later recounting of John Ehrlichman, this was because Nixon could not fulfill Jackson's demand that Dan Evans, the Republican governor of Washington, appoint a Democrat to fill his U.S. Senate seat if he vacated it to become secretary of defense.

On December 12, in Washington, D.C., Nixon held an event announcement of his selections for all twelve Cabinet secretary positions. The announcement was broadcast on television and radio. No president had ever announced their cabinet this way, all at once in a grand event. Many of the selections had been leaked to the press prior to the announcement.

Nixon's Cabinet was far less representative of the United States populace than he had set out for it to be. It was noted in the press, after Nixon's unveiling of his Cabinet picks, that Nixon had not named a single black person, woman, Jew, or Democrat to a Cabinet post. His cabinet picks were entirely white men. His cabinet was also noted to be entirely Republican. The lack of a Democrat in his Cabinet came despite a campaign promise during the election that he would look to men from both parties and of differing perspectives to unite the country. Nixon's communications director Herb Klein defended this the day Cabinet selections were picked by declaring that Nixon's selections were actually, "all independents who vote Republican". Nixon press spokesman Ronald Ziegler also defended this by promising that the, yet-to-be-announced, United States ambassador to the United Nations would be a Democrat.

Nixon was slow to select appointees outside of his cabinet members. On January 17, the New York Times was only able to count a total of 81 announced designees, with most being White House staff. This left Nixon's administration lacking staff at the start of his presidency, and relying greatly on holdovers from Johnson's administration.

Due to his belief in "Cabinet government", Nixon would allow appointees of his liberty in choosing their own subordinates. This would have consequences in his presidency. For example, at times, his administration would pursue more liberal domestic policies than those of Nixon's own philosophy. Perhaps, partially in consequence, Nixon would spend much of his presidency endeavoring for greater control of the executive branch, and would distrust his own Cabinet and members of the government bureaucracy, leading him to expand the size of the White House staff.

==== Defense and foreign policy ====
- Melvin Laird as secretary of defense (announced December 12, 1968)
- David Packard as deputy secretary of defense (announced December 30, 1968)
- William P. Rogers as secretary of state (announced December 12, 1968)
- Elliot L. Richardson as under secretary of state (announced January 4, 1969)
- Charles Yost as United States representative to the United Nations (announced December 20, 1968)
- Henry Kissinger as national security advisor (announced December 2, 1968)
- Richard Helms as director of the CIA (announced December 16, 1968) incumbent officeholder
- J. Edgar Hoover as director of the FBI (announced December 16, 1968) incumbent officeholder
- Henry Cabot Lodge Jr. as chief U.S. negotiator for Vietnamese peace talks (announced January 5, 1969)
- Lawrence Walsh as deputy U.S. negotiator for Vietnamese peace talks (announced January 5, 1969)
- Clarence D. Palmby, assistant secretary of agriculture for international affairs and commodity programs (announced January 6, 1969)

==== Domestic policy ====
- John N. Mitchell as attorney general (announced December 12, 1968)
- Winton M. Blount as postmaster general (announced December 12, 1968)
- Clifford M. Hardin as secretary of agriculture (announced December 12, 1968)
- Robert Finch as secretary of health, education, and welfare (announced December 12, 1968)
- George W. Romney as Secretary of housing and urban development (announced December 12, 1968)
- Wally Hickel as secretary of the interior (announced December 12, 1968)
- George Shultz as secretary of labor (announced December 12, 1968)
- John A. Volpe as secretary of transportation (announced December 12, 1968)
- Phil Campbell, undersecretary of agriculture (announced January 6, 1969)
- James Day Hodgson as deputy secretary of labor (announced January 10, 1969)
- James E. Johnson, to fill vacant seat on the United States Civil Service Commission (announced January 17, 1969)
- Daniel Patrick Moynihan, secretary of the Urban Affairs Council and liaison for District of Columbia affairs

==== Economic policy ====
- Maurice Stans as secretary of commerce (announced December 12, 1968)
- David M. Kennedy as secretary of the treasury (announced December 12, 1968)
- Robert P. Mayo, director of the Office of Management and Budget (announced December 11, 1968)
- Paul McCracken as chairman of Council of Economic Advisors (announced December 4, 1968)

==== White House staff ====
- H. R. Haldeman as White House chief of staff (announced November 13, 1968)
- Ron Ziegler, White House press secretary
- Herbert Klein as Executive Branch communications director (announced November 25, 1968)
- John Ehrlichman as White House counsel (announced November 14, 1968)
- Lee Alvin DuBridge as science advisor to the president (announced December 3, 1968)
- Bryce Harlow as assistant to the president for legislation and Congressional affairs (announced November 12, 1968)
- James Keogh, managing editor of White House papers

==== Other ====
- Frank Shakespeare, director of the United States Information Agency (announced January 13, 1968)

== Assessment of the transition ==
The Nixon transition is considered by some to have been a smooth transition. Stephen H. Hess of the Brookings Institution wrote in March 2001, that "Richard Nixon's transition was one of the smoothest in recent memory."
