= An Act to regulate the Time and Manner of administering certain Oaths =

First law passed by the U.S. Congress

- Enacted by: the 1st United States Congress

Citations
- Public law: Pub. L. 1–1 (Session 1; 1 Stat. 23) (1789)
- Statutes at Large: 1 Stat. 23 (Chapter 1) (1789)

Legislative history
- Passed the House on April 27, 1789; Passed the Senate on May 5, 1789; Signed into law by President George Washington on June 1, 1789

An Act to regulate the Time and Manner of administering certain Oaths was the first law passed by the United States Congress after the ratification of the U.S. Constitution. It was signed by President George Washington on June 1, 1789, and parts of it remain in effect to this day.

The House of Representatives reached its first quorum on April 1, 1789. Five days later, it appointed a committee to draft a bill on the manner of administration of the oath for members of Congress required under Article VI of the Constitution. The House also voted that day to instruct the committee to include the following wording for the oath:

"I, A B a Representative of the United States in the Congress thereof, do solemnly swear or affirm (as the case may be) that I will support the Constitution of the United States."

On April 25, the committee reported its bill to the whole House, which approved it two days later. The Senate committee charged with the bill added a section requiring state officials and legislators to take the same oath as members of Congress. The Senate approved the bill with the change on May 5. The House did not object to the Senate's change, and representatives of each body took the bill to Washington for his signature.

The oath in the final bill differed from the original proposal by excluding the two clauses mentioning God, as well as the phrase "a Representative of the United States in Congress thereof". The act stipulated that any senator was to administer the oath to the president of the Senate (that is, the vice president of the United States). The vice president then administers the oath to the senators. In the House, a representative administers the oath to the speaker, who then does the same to the other members. State and other federal officials were to take the same oath, administered by someone to be authorized by a later law.

Parts of the statute remain in Title 2, Sections § 21, § 22, and § 25, and Title 4, § 101 and § 102, of the United States Code.
