= First inauguration of Richard Nixon =

46th United States presidential inauguration

First presidential inauguration of Richard Nixon
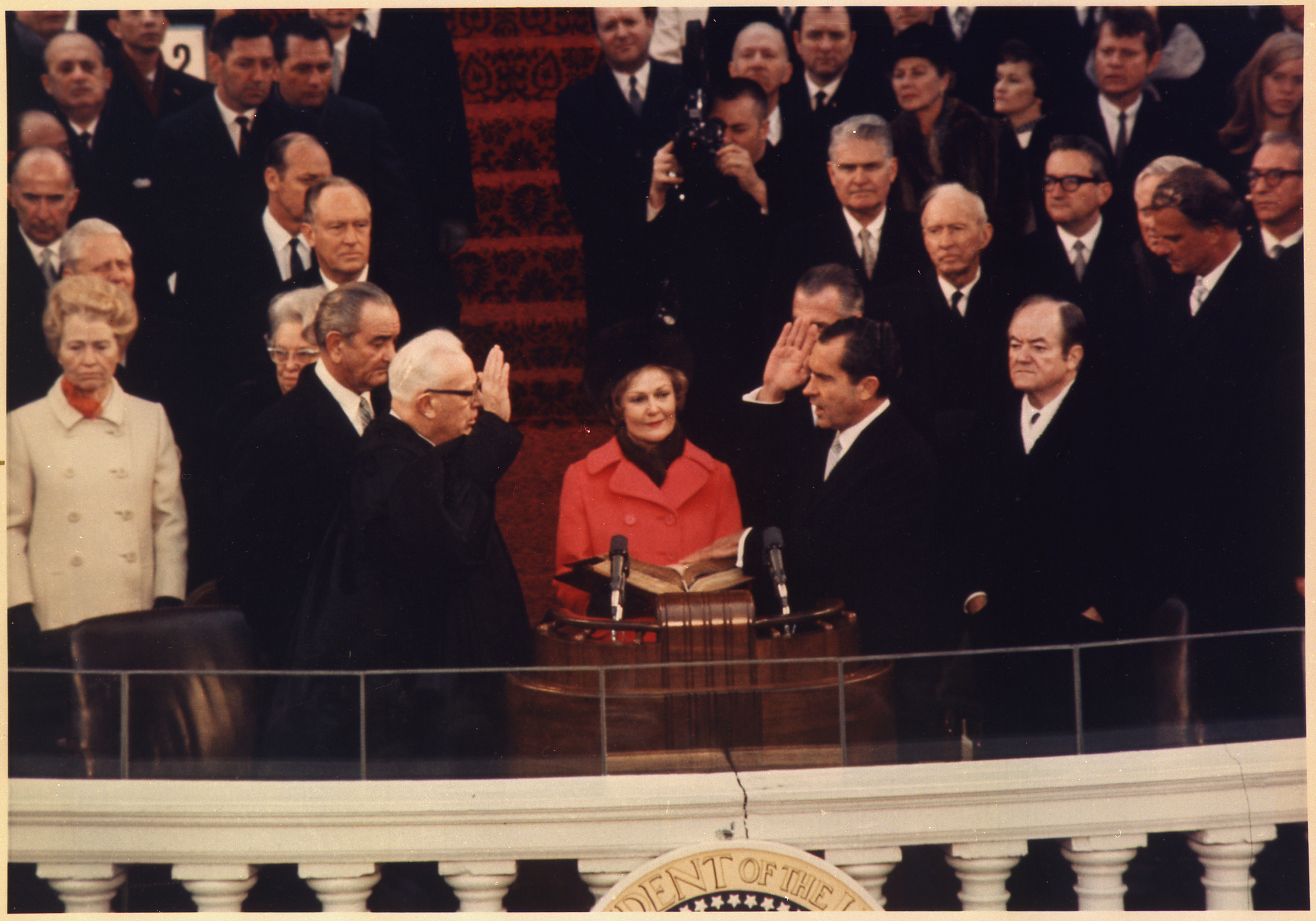
- Richard Nixon takes the oath of office as the 37th president of the United States
- Date: January 20, 1969; 57 years ago
- Location: United States Capitol, Washington, D.C.
- Organized by: Joint Congressional Committee on Inaugural Ceremonies
- Participants: Richard Nixon; 37th president of the United States — Assuming office Earl Warren; Chief Justice of the United States — Administering oath Spiro Agnew; 39th vice president of the United States — Assuming office Everett Dirksen; United States Senate minority leader — Administering oath

The first inauguration of Richard Nixon as the 37th president of the United States was held on Monday, January 20, 1969, at the East Portico of the United States Capitol in Washington, D.C. This was the 46th inauguration and marked the commencement of the first and eventually only full term of both Richard Nixon as president and Spiro Agnew as vice president. Chief Justice Earl Warren administered the presidential oath of office to Nixon, and Senate Minority Leader Everett Dirksen administered the vice presidential oath to Agnew. Nixon had narrowly defeated Hubert Humphrey, the incumbent vice president, in the presidential election. Nixon became the first non-incumbent vice president to be inaugurated as president, something that would not happen again until Joe Biden in 2021. (Had Walter Mondale won the 1984 presidential election, he would have been the second non-incumbent vice president to be inaugurated as president, unless Jimmy Carter had won reelection in the 1980 presidential election in this scenario). This was also the last presidential oath administered by Chief Justice Earl Warren. It was the last time until 2025 that Hail, Columbia wasn't played for the new vice president immediately upon taking the oath.

== Inaugural address ==
Nixon delivered an inaugural address, after taking his oath of office. He used a phrase which would go on to be his most famous one:

The greatest honor history can bestow is the title of peacemaker.

== Gallery ==
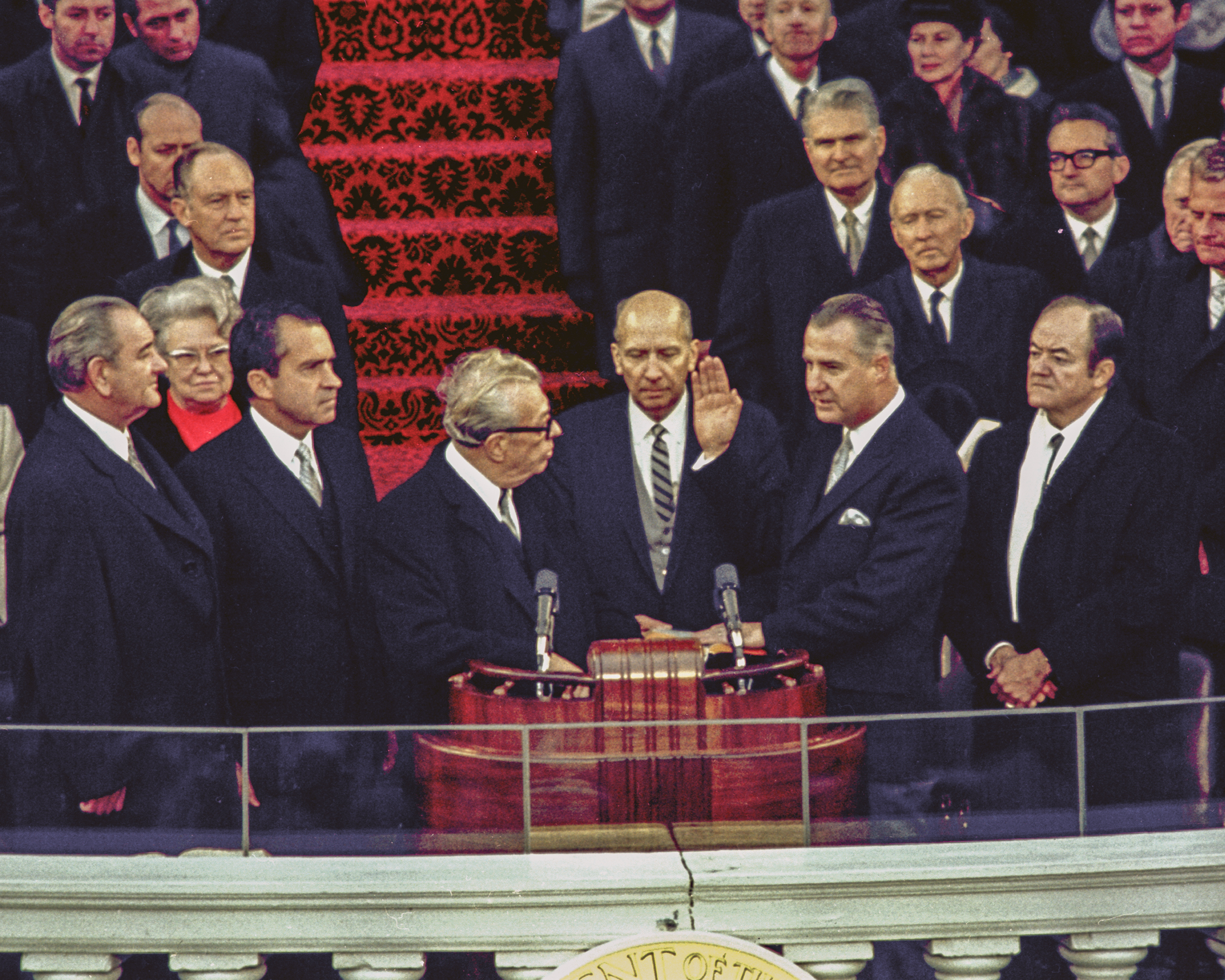
Four vice presidents were present at the inauguration. From left to right: outgoing president Lyndon B. Johnson (the 37th vice president), incoming president Richard Nixon (36th), Senate minority leader Everett Dirksen who was administering the oath of office to 39th vice president Spiro Agnew, and the outgoing vice president Hubert Humphrey (38th).

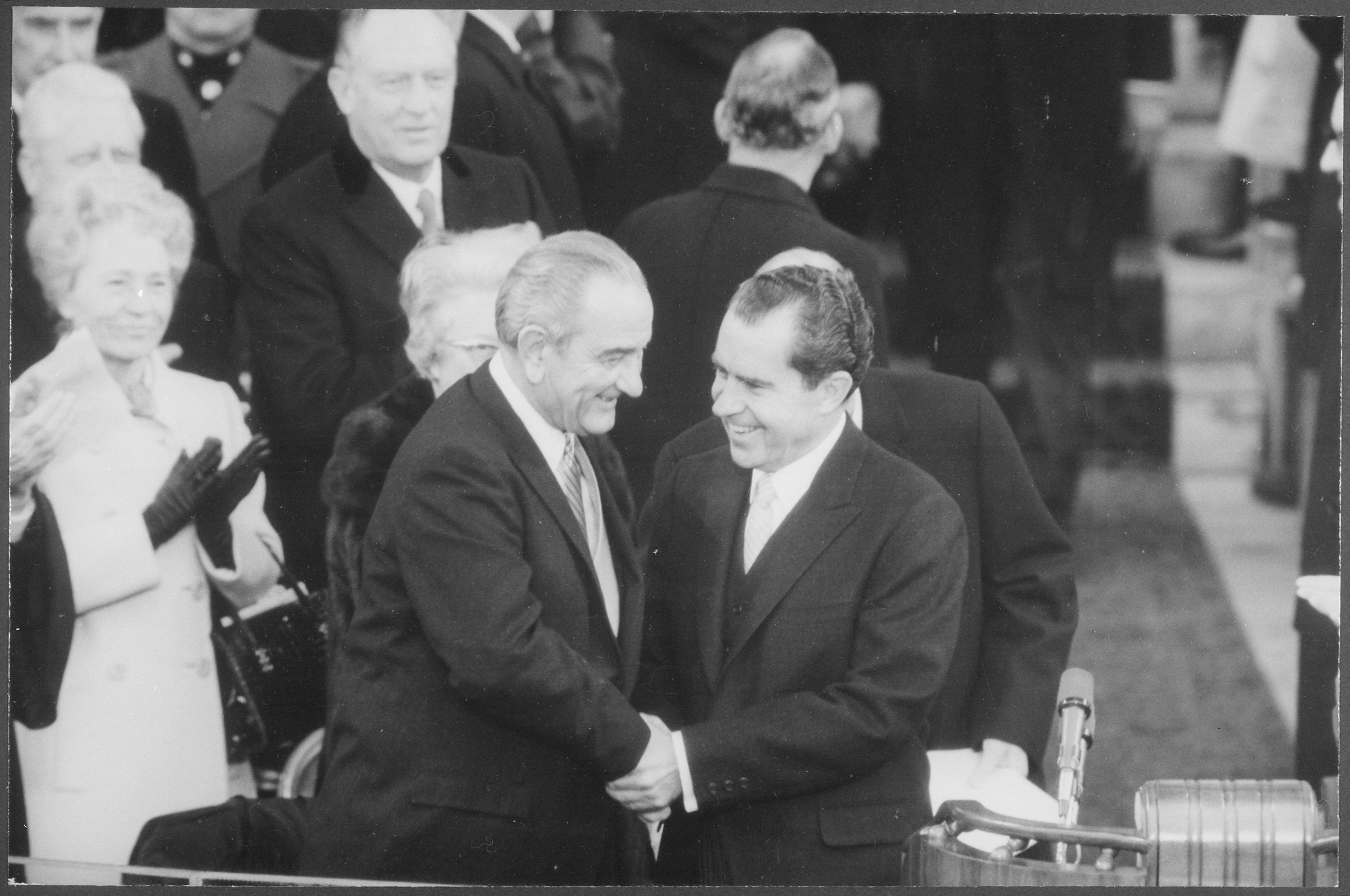
Presidents Johnson and Nixon

== See also ==
- Presidential transition of Richard Nixon
- Presidency of Richard Nixon
- Second inauguration of Richard Nixon
- 1968 United States presidential election
- Richard Nixon 1968 presidential campaign

== Bibliography ==
- "Avalon Project - The Inaugural Addresses of the Presidents". avalon.law.yale.edu.
