= Francis A. Nixon =

Father of U.S. president Richard Nixon

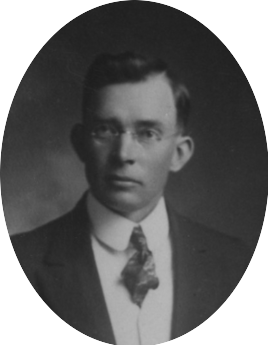
- Nixon in 1916
- Born: Francis Anthony Nixon; December 3, 1878; Elk Township, Ohio, U.S.
- Died: September 4, 1956 (aged 77); La Habra, California, U.S.
- Known for: Father of U.S. president Richard Nixon
- Political party: Republican; Democratic (before 1896)
- Spouse: Hannah Milhous Nixon (m. 1908)
- Children: 5, including Richard, Donald, and Edward
- Relatives: Julie Nixon Eisenhower (granddaughter); Tricia Nixon Cox (granddaughter); Christopher Nixon Cox (great-grandson); Jennie Eisenhower (great-granddaughter); Pat Nixon (daughter-in-law); Edward F. Cox (grandson-in-law); David Eisenhower (grandson-in-law)

Francis Anthony Nixon (December 3, 1878 – September 4, 1956) was an American business owner and the father of U.S. president Richard Nixon.

== Early life and education ==
Nixon was born in Elk Township, Vinton County, Ohio, the son of Samuel Brady Nixon, who was from Smith Township, Washington County, Pennsylvania, and Sarah Ann (née Wadsworth), a native of Hocking Township, Fairfield County, Ohio. Nixon's family ancestry included colonial Pennsylvania Quakers. He was raised Methodist, however, but converted to Quakerism when he married Hannah Milhous.

Sarah Nixon died in January 1888, leaving Francis to live with an uncle during his father's struggle to avoid poverty and to cope with the loss of Sarah. After Francis' father remarried, Francis moved away. Biographer Jonathan Aitken cited Francis' dislike of his new stepmother as his reason for leaving. Nixon proceeded to have multiple jobs during the next fourteen years.

Throughout his youth, Nixon idolized U.S. Presidents Thomas Jefferson and Andrew Jackson. Biographer Stephen E. Ambrose wrote that Nixon ceased favoring the Democratic Party by the age of 17. During the campaign for the 1896 United States presidential election, Nixon had an encounter with presidential candidate William McKinley, who asked him how he was going to vote, Nixon replying, "Republican, of course!" Ambrose cited the encounter as completing Nixon's switch to favoring the Republican Party.

== Biography ==
Nixon relocated to California at the end of the century after having been frostbitten working as a motorman in an open streetcar in Columbus, Ohio. After working as a farmhand and oil field roustabout, he attempted to cultivate lemons outside Los Angeles. Francis' son Richard also tested the waters of the citrus business. Shortly after graduating from law school, Richard founded the Citra-Frost Company which attempted to produce and sell frozen orange juice.

After his son Richard was born, Francis Nixon abandoned the lemon grove, and the family relocated to the Quaker community of East Whittier, California. The Nixon family then operated two businesses at the corner of Whittier Boulevard and Santa Gertrudes Avenue: a store that sold groceries and an Atlantic Richfield gasoline station, but the family remained impoverished. Nixon's life was marked by the deaths of two of his sons, Arthur and Harold, from tuberculosis. He has been described as a "restless, frustrated, and angry man, a mean-spirited person who psychologically abused his five sons and sometimes beat them." However, Richard always spoke well of his parents. He began his memoirs with the words "I was born in a house my father built". Writer Jessamyn West, a cousin of the Nixons, was in Frank's Sunday school class at East Whittier Friends Church for some time. She later described him as "a fiery persuasive teacher", and wrote that Frank Nixon's version of the social gospel made her favor socialism.

By the time of his later adulthood, Nixon often discussed his political opinions with strangers, his son Don remembering his father as being willing to debate anyone he encountered in the family market and having an intolerance of Democrats. Nixon voted for Woodrow Wilson in the 1916 United States presidential election, Warren G. Harding in the 1920 presidential election, Robert Lafollette in the 1924 presidential election, Herbert Hoover in both the 1928 and 1932 presidential elections, and Franklin Roosevelt in the 1936 election.

After his son Arthur's death in 1925, Nixon was haunted by the possibility of God having allowed the death as a form of personal punishment directed and pondered this frequently. He never again opened the family store on Sundays and started to have the family listen to sermons every evening. Nixon favored Robert P. Shuler, Billy Sunday, and Aimee Semple McPherson, taking his sons once a week to hear either Shuler or McPherson at Trinity Methodist Church.

In 1938, Francis' son Richard met Pat Ryan, who Frank reportedly developed a "playful relationship" with and spared the same criticisms he had given his children.

During the controversy concerning Richard's alleged improprieties relating to a fund established by his backers to reimburse him for his political expenses, Frank was "reduced to sobs" in hearing of the story and angered by his son's taking of any funds.

The elder Nixons cared for their granddaughters Julie and Patricia while Vice President Nixon was involved with the 1956 Republican National Convention. Francis experienced a ruptured abdominal artery in the latter part of the month from which he was not expected to recover, resulting in the vice president curtailing his public appearances to tend to his father, who advocated that his son return to San Francisco and work with the convention; Vice President Nixon refused. On September 3, Nixon was visited by Richard, who he told upon the latter leaving, "Good night Dick, but I don't think I'll be here in the morning." The next day, Francis Nixon died, his funeral being carried out three days later at the East Whittier Friends Meeting House.

== Personal life ==
On June 25, 1908, he married Hannah Milhous and had five sons, one of whom died in childhood:

- Harold Samuel Nixon (June 1, 1909 – March 7, 1933)
- Richard Milhous Nixon (January 9, 1913 – April 22, 1994)
- Francis Donald Nixon (November 23, 1914 – June 27, 1987)
- Arthur Burdg Nixon (May 26, 1918 – August 10, 1925)
- Edward Calvert Nixon (May 3, 1930 – February 27, 2019)

Nixon died on September 4, 1956, in La Habra, California while his son, Richard, was Vice President.

== In popular culture ==
He was played by actor Tom Bower in Oliver Stone's movie Nixon.
