= Donald A. Nixon =

American businessman

- Born: December 12, 1945 (age 80)
- Occupation: Businessman
- Parent(s): Donald Nixon; Clara Jane Lemke
- Relatives: Tricia Nixon Cox (cousin); Julie Nixon Eisenhower (cousin); Edward F. Cox (cousin-in-law); David Eisenhower (cousin-in-law); Richard Nixon (uncle); Edward Nixon (uncle); Arthur Nixon (uncle)

Donald Anthony Nixon (born December 12, 1945) is an American businessman. He is the nephew of former President Richard Nixon and the son of Richard Nixon's brother Donald Nixon and Clara Jane Lemke.

== Early life ==
Donald A. Nixon grew up in Southern California, served in the Vietnam War and attended various colleges and universities. His parents were Donald Nixon (1914–1987) and Clara Jane Nixon (1920–2013).

== Business career ==
In the early 1970s, Nixon was encouraged by his family to undertake a position in finance with financier Robert Vesco in Europe. While he lived in Geneva, he proved himself and over time, he and Vesco, the chairman of a substantial organization owning banks, mutual funds, real estate and various global entities, developed a relationship and Nixon became Vesco's live-in assistant; later conducting business globally with businesses and governments.

In the mid 1990s, Nixon once again encountered Vesco who was living in Cuba with ties to the government. Cuba helped Nixon to create manufacturing facilities and clinical trials for an allegedly immunity-boosting drug derived from the citronella-based herbal remedy Viroxan. The Cuban authorities initially accused Nixon of being involved in the "international drug trade" with Vesco, which led to Nixon and Vesco's detention by government authorities in May 1995. Nixon was allowed to leave Cuba in July. Vesco was later convicted of "economic crimes against the state" and sentenced to thirteen years in jail.
