= Hannah Milhous Nixon =

Mother of U.S. president Richard Nixon

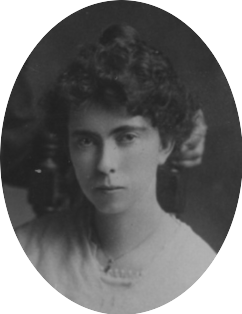
- Nixon in 1916
- Born: Hannah Elizabeth Milhous; March 7, 1885 near Butlerville, Indiana, U.S.
- Died: September 30, 1967 (aged 82); Whittier, California, U.S.
- Education: Whittier College (dropped out)
- Known for: Mother of U.S. president Richard Nixon
- Spouse: Francis A. Nixon (m. 1908; died 1956)
- Children: 5, including Richard, Donald, and Edward
- Relatives: Pat Nixon (daughter-in-law); Tricia Nixon Cox (granddaughter); Julie Nixon Eisenhower (granddaughter); David Eisenhower (grandson-in-law); Jennie Eisenhower (great-granddaughter)

Hannah Elizabeth Milhous Nixon (née Milhous; March 7, 1885 – September 30, 1967) was the mother of U.S. president Richard Nixon. Hannah's influence on her son was profound, and he frequently spoke about his admiration for his mother, including at his farewell speech to the White House staff.

== Early life ==
She was born Hannah Elizabeth Milhous near Butlerville, Indiana, the daughter of Almira Park (née Burdg; 1849–1943), who was from Columbiana County, Ohio, and Franklin Milhous (1848–1919), a native of Colerain Township, Belmont County, Ohio.

== Family ==
She married Francis A. Nixon and had five sons, one of whom died in childhood:

- Harold Samuel Nixon (June 1, 1909 – March 7, 1933)
- Richard Milhous Nixon (January 9, 1913 – April 22, 1994), 37th president of the United States, married to Thelma Catherine Patricia Ryan and had two daughters.
- Francis Donald Nixon (November 23, 1914 – June 27, 1987), married to Clara Jane Lemke and had three children, including Donald A. Nixon
- Arthur Burdg Nixon (May 26, 1918 – August 10, 1925)
- Edward Calvert Nixon (May 3, 1930 – February 27, 2019)

== Influence on Richard Nixon ==
In October 1960, during Richard Nixon's presidential campaign, columnist Drew Pearson accused Richard of having a conflict of interest as Vice President; on December 10, 1956, Hannah Nixon allegedly received a $205,000 loan from the Hughes Tool Company, owned by Howard Hughes. Afterwards, Pearson wrote, Hughes' "problems with various government agencies had improved". Robert Finch responded to the allegation by saying it was "an obvious political smear in the last two weeks of the campaign", and that the loan actually came from Frank J. Waters, a California attorney who was Nixon's friend. Nixon had no comment.

Richard described his mother as "a Quaker saint". On May 9, 1970 (the date of his visit to the Lincoln Memorial), he insisted on stopping at the United States Capitol, where he took his former seat in the chamber of the U.S. House of Representatives and instructed his valet Manolo Sanchez to make a speech. Sanchez spoke of his pride in being a citizen of the United States and Richard and some female cleaners who were present applauded. One of the women present, Carrie Moore, asked Richard to sign her bible, which he did, and holding her hand told her that his mother "was a saint" and "you be a saint too".

Hannah Nixon is acknowledged to have exerted a tremendous effect on her son's outlook throughout his life. In Richard's final remarks at the White House on August 9, 1974, he said, "Nobody will ever write a book, probably, about my mother. Well, I guess all of you would say this about your mother – my mother was a saint. And I think of her, two boys dying of tuberculosis, nursing four others in order that she could take care of my older brother for three years in Arizona, and seeing each of them die, and when they died, it was like one of her own. Yes, she will have no books written about her. But she was a saint."

== In popular culture ==
Mary Steenburgen portrayed Hannah Nixon in the 1995 Oliver Stone film Nixon.

Her maiden name and her son Richard's middle name, Milhous, was used by Matt Groening, creator of the cartoon sitcom The Simpsons, for Bart Simpson's friend Milhouse because it was the most "unfortunate name [Groening] could think of for a kid".

Honorary titles
Preceded by Rebekah Baines	Mother of the President of the United States; Posthumous; January 20, 1969 – August 9, 1974	Succeeded by Dorothy Ayer Gardner Ford
