= Edward Nixon =

American businessman

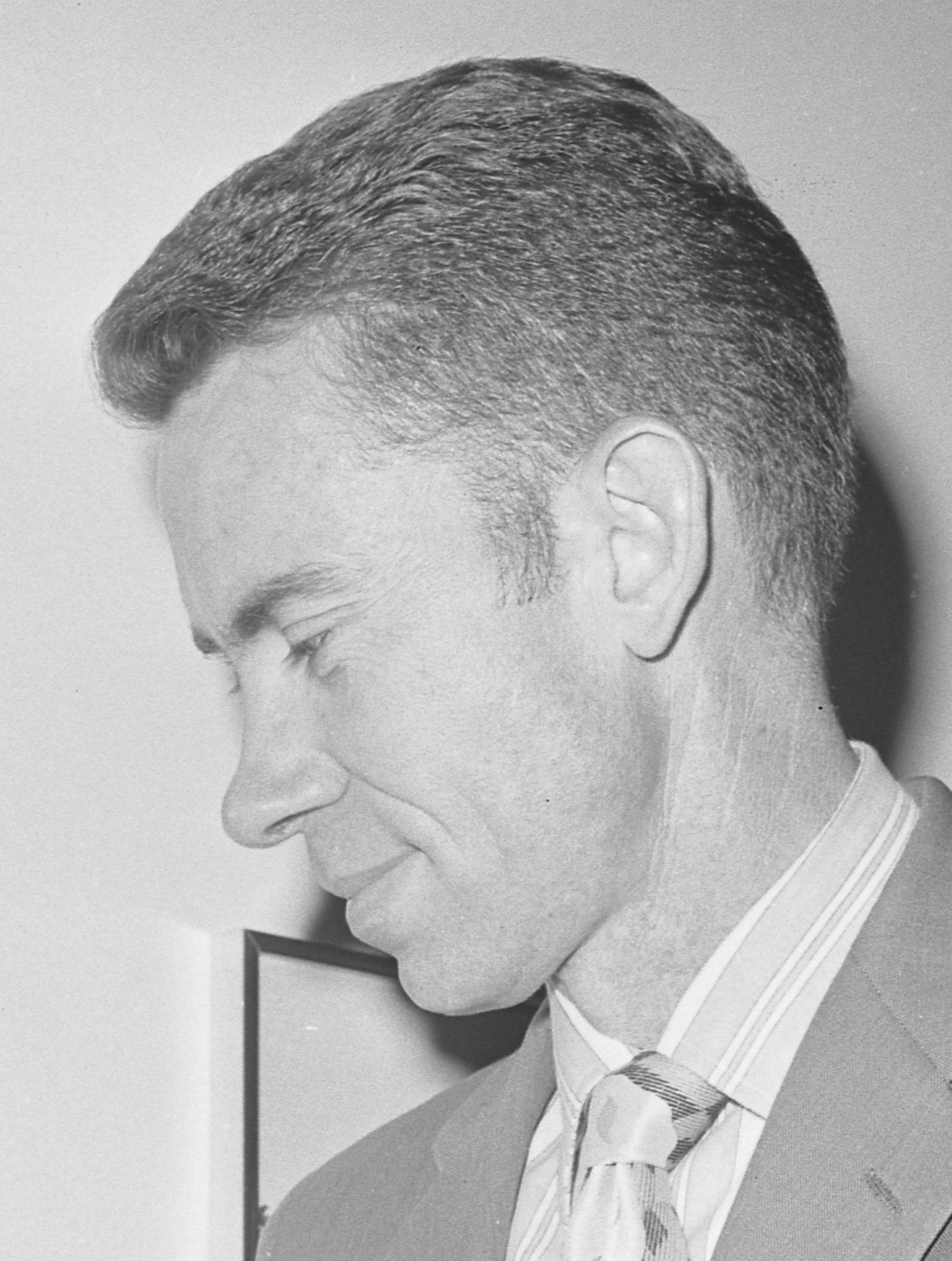
- Nixon in 1971
- Born: Edward Calvert Nixon; May 3, 1930; Whittier, California, U.S.
- Died: February 27, 2019 (aged 88); Bothell, Washington, U.S.
- Education: Duke University (B.S., 1952); North Carolina State College (M.S., 1954)
- Occupations: Entrepreneur, pilot
- Spouse: Gay Lynne Woods (m. 1957; died 2014)
- Children: 2
- Parent(s): Francis A. Nixon; Hannah Milhous Nixon
- Relatives: Harold Nixon (brother); Richard Nixon (brother); Donald Nixon (brother); Arthur Nixon (brother); Almira Park Burdg Milhous (grandmother); Franklin Milhous (grandfather); Jennie Eisenhower (great-niece); Christopher Nixon Cox (great-nephew); David Eisenhower (nephew-in-law); Tricia Nixon Cox (niece); Julie Nixon Eisenhower (niece); Edward F. Cox (nephew-in-law); Pat Nixon (sister-in-law)

Edward Calvert Nixon (May 3, 1930 – February 27, 2019) was an American entrepreneur and naval aviator. He was the youngest brother of U.S. President Richard Nixon.

== Early life ==
Born in Whittier, California, Edward was the youngest child of Francis and Hannah Nixon. In addition to his brother Richard (January 9, 1913 – April 22, 1994), Edward had two other brothers in his lifetime: Harold Nixon (June 1, 1909 – March 7, 1933) and Donald Nixon (November 23, 1914 – June 27, 1987). Another brother, Arthur Nixon (May 26, 1918 – August 10, 1925), died before Edward was born.

Nixon graduated from Duke University with a BS in 1952 and from North Carolina State College with an MS in 1954. Both degrees were in geology. He served in the United States Navy until 1962 as a naval aviator and helicopter flight instructor. Nixon served on his brother's presidential campaigns, including as co-chairman in 1972. He was an expert on global energy use and spent much of his professional life studying how people use natural resources. He was an advisor to companies on these issues.

== Watergate ==
In 1974, Edward Nixon was the first witness for the defense in the Maurice Stans and John N. Mitchell conspiracy trial. He contradicted the testimony of two of the government's chief witnesses. Later that year, the staff of the Senate Watergate committee disclosed additional information to support the charge that Charles Rebozo gave or lent part of a $100,000 "campaign contribution" to President Nixon's personal secretary Rose Mary Woods, and to Edward and Donald Nixon.

== Later life ==
From 1971 until his death, Nixon was the president of Nixon World Enterprises, Inc., an international consulting service based in Washington state. Nixon also taught as an assistant professor of naval science at the University of Washington in addition to working as a helicopter flight instructor.

Nixon's memoir, The Nixons: A Family Portrait, was published in 2009; it was co-authored with Karen L. Olson.

== Personal life ==
Edward Nixon was the last surviving member of the five Nixon brothers following Richard's death in 1994.

Edward Nixon married Gay Lynne Woods on June 1, 1957. The couple lived together, for a time, in the Seattle-area suburb of Alderwood Manor, Washington. Gay worked as a schoolteacher at Woodway High School, as well as Meadowdale Junior High School in Edmonds. They had two daughters together—Amelie Peiffer and Elizabeth Matheny—and were married for 56 years until Gay's death on January 20, 2014.

Edward Nixon died at a nursing facility in Bothell, Washington, on February 27, 2019, at the age of 88.

== Depictions in media ==
In the 1995 Oliver Stone film Nixon, a youthful Edward Nixon is played by Mikey Stone.
