= Clive Syddall =

British filmmaker and journalist

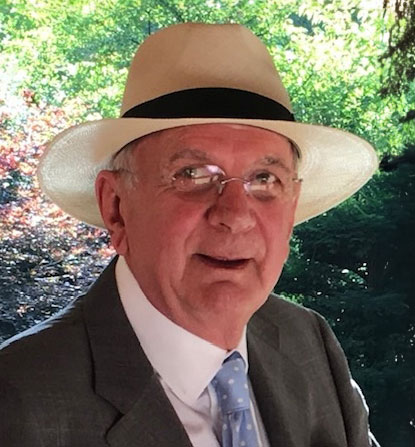
- Clive Syddall
- Born: Forfar, Scotland
- Education: University of Leicester and University of Oxford
- Occupations: Filmmaker; Television Journalist

Clive Syddall (born 5 February 1943) is a British award-winning filmmaker and television journalist noted for several campaigning documentaries. He has served in senior roles in the independent television sector, as a trustee of Marie Curie Cancer Care and communications advisor to the British Red Cross.

== Life and career ==
Syddall was born in Forfar, Scotland. He was educated at St Egbert's College Boys School in London, followed by the University of Leicester and Wadham College, Oxford.

Syddall’s television career began in 1968. First as a graduate trainee with ITV Southern Television, then moving to the BBC as producer and director on 24 Hours, Midweek and later BBC’s flagship Panorama.

Syddall was the BBC’s resident producer in Washington covering the Watergate Hearings securing the first interview with Nixon White House aide, John D. Erlichman, later gaoled for his role in the scandal. Clive also persuaded President Nixon's daughter Julie and her husband David Eisenhower, grandson of the former President, to appear live on the BBC to take questions from the ordinary British public. Reported at the time as ‘unprecedented’ and ‘an astonishing coup by the BBC’.

In 1978 he was appointed deputy editor of the BBC's The Money Programme and later story editor on Newsnight.

In 1982 he moved to New York as an independent producer, directing and producing documentaries for the BBC, Channel 4 and PBS. Films included Gang City – the story of the ongoing gang warfare in the Olympic City of Los Angeles BBC2, A Bitter Harvest - The Killing Fields of Mindanao, an investigation into major human rights violations taking place on a plantation funded by the British taxpayer in the Philippines (Channel 4) and Eater of Men - the first rafting expedition attempting the descent of the treacherous Waghi River in New-Guinea 'the-most-dangerous white-water river run ever filmed' reported the Royal Geographical Society at the time; produced for British Academy series River Journeys (BBC / PBS). He was also involved in the development of several feature films including the Oscar winning movie The Mission (Warner Brothers).

In 1988 he was invited to become managing director of Antelope Films. Productions included Global Rivals - The History of US Soviet Rivalry, for PBS, Pasternak - for an extended South Bank Show - a dramatised documentary on Boris Pasternak, the creator of Dr Zhivago, the first co-production between the British film Industry and Soviet State Film Company Video-Film. Other productions included The Margot Fonteyn Story (Channel 4) and the Cinema Short 1867 The Execution of Maximilian winner of the New York Film Festival Gold Medal Award for best Cinematography.

In 1992 he set up Paladin Pictures Ltd, specialising in current affairs, history and music and arts programming. Productions included Dance Ballerina Dance a BBC Christmas special and Travels With My Tutu which attracted record audiences, both presented by the Royal Ballet's principal ballerina Deborah Bull, The People's Duchess - the dramatised documentary of Georgiana Duchess of Devonshire the ill-fated ancestor of Diana Princess of Wales, reviewed at the time as 'The Benchmark for all Future History Documentaries (Channel 4). Several campaign documentaries included The Last Flight of Zulu Delta 576 - an investigation into the Chinook helicopter crash over the Mull of Kintyre killing 29 of Britain's top secret service personnel (Channel 4). The film led to a Parliamentary Inquiry and a decision in 2008 by the Secretary of State for Defence to review the case finally clearing the names of the two helicopter pilots.

In 2000 he formed a joint venture with Emmy -award-winning director Bill Cran and formed Paladin Invision. Productions for international distribution included Sinatra Dark Star - a 90-minute investigation into Sinatra's connection to the Mafia, Harem – TV mini-series telling the story of three of the most powerful women in the Ottoman Empire for Channel 4 and Jihad - The Men and Ideas Behind Al-Qaeda (15) a 2-hour documentary that launched the PBS series America at a Crossroads, awarded the du Pont Columbia University Award for ‘Excellence in Journalism’ in 2008.

He was council member of the Royal Television Society, Trustee of Marie Curie Cancer Care 1991-1994 and communications advisor to the British Red Cross (1991-1994).

== Personal life ==
Clive is married to noted interior designer Penelope Hughes-Ross whose ancestors include the prison reformer Elizabeth Fry and the anti-slavery campaigner Sir Thomas Fowell Buxton MP. Fowell Buxton featured in the recent exhibition: “Sir Thomas Fowell Buxton BT and Other Forgotten Champions of the Abolition Campaign” held at London’s Reform Club, which he and his wife initiated and helped to curate.

In 2012 Clive and Penny were both invited by her cousin Christopher Buxton OBE to become directors of Kirtlington Park Ltd to help manage and restore Kirtlington Park House – a Grade 1 listed Palladian mansion dating back to the 18th century set in Capability Brown parkland, where they remained until Christopher died in 2017.

They now live in west London by the river Thames.

== Documentary Filmography ==
Documentary - Single Productions
Year	Title	Format	Description	Distribution	Awards
2008	JIHAD - The Men and Ideas behind Al-Qaeda	1 x 2 hrs	Launched the PBS series America At A Crossroads	PBS	Awarded the du Pont Columbia University Award for ‘Excellence in Journalism’ and an Emmy Nomination – ‘Outstanding Historical Programme’ (2008)
2008	Sinatra - Dark Star	1 x 90 mins	Sinatra's connections to Mafia leaders	BBC / ZDF / A&E	
2008	An Islamic Conscience – The Aga Khan and the Ismailis	1 x 60 mins	Profile of and interview with HH The Aga Khan		
	The Demonised Duchess	1 x 75 mins	Wallis Simpson Duchess of Windsor.	Channel 4	
2002	Nelson's Trafalgar	1 x 90 mins	Broadcast to coincide with the bicentenary of the Battle of Trafalgar.	Channel 4	
1999	The People's Duchess		Dramatised documentary about Georgiana Cavendish, Duchess of Devonshire	Channel 4	
1998	Purple Secret - In Search of Royal Madness	1 x 60 mins	60’ investigation into Porphyria and the madness of King George III and his descendants	Channel 4	
1997	The Last Flight of Zulu 567	1 x 75 mins	Investigation into the Chinook helicopter crash over the Mull of Kintyre killing 29 of Britain's top secret service personnel.	Channel 4	
	The Assassin	1 x 50 mins	Film tracking down the American born Chilean Secret Agent hired to assassinate the foes of General Pinochet	BBC 1 (Inside Story)	
	Julia's Baby	1 x 60 mins	Julia is deaf, blind, single and pregnant, who will care for Julia's Baby?	Channel 4	
1995	Lost in Africa	1 x 60 mins	Documentary on the fight by the International Red Cross to save 100,000 children separated from their parents by the civil war in Rwanda,	Channel 4	
1993	An Ordinary Boy		Colin and Wendy Parry, whose son Tim was killed in the Warrington IRA bombing, travel to Northern Ireland to find out the reason for Tim's murder.	BBC (Panorama)	New York International Film & TV Festival award 1993
1987	Command and Control – How nuclear weapons are controlled		Documentary report about "Command and Control", the collection of telephones, code books, keys and triggers that is supposed to stop a nuclear war.	Channel 4	
1987	A Bitter Harvest - The killing fields of Mindanao		Investigation into major human rights violations carried out on a Palm Oil Plantation in the Philippines part funded by British Taxpayers.	Channel 4	
1979	Ambassador Jay		Profile of the Prime Minister Jim Callaghan's son-in-law as British Ambassador in Washington and the workings of the embassy. With reporter Michael Cockerell	BBC (Panorama)	
1977	Allahabad Speaks		Investigation of how the citizens of the City of Indira Gandhi's birthplace fared under her 'state of emergency' during which civil liberties were suspended, the press censored and widespread atrocities were carried out. With presenter David Dimbleby.	BBC (Panorama)	
1976	Who'll Help Letcher County?		1976 Presidential Election as seen through the eyes of the BBC citizens of one of the poorest counties in America. With presenter David Dimbleby.	BBC (Panorama)	

Documentary - Single Production (Music & Arts)
Year	Title	Format	Description	Distribution	Awards
2002	P G Woodhouse The Long Exile	1 x 75 mins	TV documentary. The story of lyricist and writer P.G. Wodehouse, from his days on Broadway through to his wartime years in an internment camp in Germany which led to accusations of treachery.	Channel 4	
2001	The Real Tommy Cooper	1 x 60 mins	Workaholic comic Tommy Cooper is remembered by friends and colleagues.	Channel 4	
1997	A Death in Venice		An investigation in to who or what caused the fire at Venice's Fenice Opera House.	BBC 2 (The Works)	
	Dance Ballerina Dance		100 years of the choreography of women, presented by the Royal Ballet's Principal Ballerina Deborah Bull for BBC2's Dance Night	BBC 2 (Dance Night)	
1994	The Shearing Touch – with Melvyn Bragg	1 x 60 mins	Profile of the congenitally blind pianist George Shearing, including interviews with various musicians and recordings of performances including Johnny Dankworth, Cleo Lane and Mel Tormé.	LWT / RM Arts	New York International Film & TV Festival Award.
1992	The Vanishing Rembrandts	1 x 50 mins	Film following the Dutch Investigation into the authenticity of several Rembrandt paintings	BBC & A&E	
1991	1867 – The Execution of Maximilian		11’ cinema short re-enacting Edouard Manet painting a series of pictures of the execution of the Emperor Maximilian, filmed in a single take	Metropolitan Museum Art on Film Project / Channel 4 (Without Walls)	New York International Film & TV Festival 'Gold Medal' Award for Best Cinematography
1990	Pasternak	1 x 90 mins	Marking the centenary of Pasternak's birth and the first co-production between the British film industry and the Soviet state film company Video-film	LWT South Bank Show / Granada International / Video-Film	
1989	The Margot Fonteyn Story	1 x 90 mins	Feature-length documentary presented by Margot Fonteyn.	Channel 4 / RM Arts	

Documentary Series
Year	Title	Format	Description	Distribution	Awards
2004	The Curse of Oil - The Pipeline	3 x 1 hour		BBC2 / PBS	Cine Golden Eagle Award (2004)
2003	Harem			Channel 4	
2000	Travels With My Tutu		4 part series where Principal Ballerina Deborah Bull tries her hand at Tango, Belly dancing, Hip-Hop and Breakdancing.	BBC	
1998	Plague Wars		TV mini series presented by Tom Mangold	BBC / Worldwide	Winner Best Investigative Reporting / New Documentary Award, Chicago International Television Competition 1998
1990	1421 – The Year China Discovered America		1421 – The Year China Discovered America 120’. (1990)	PBS / Pearson TV	

BBC Documentary Series
Year	Title	Format	Description	Distribution	Awards
1984	Gang City	1 x 50 mins	Documentary on the ongoing gang warfare in the Olympic City of Los Angeles launching the BBC1 series Real Lives	BBC (Real Lives)	
1984	'Eater of Men'	1 x 50 mins	documentary on the first navigation of the Waghi river, Papua New Guinea's most treacherous white water river with explorer Christina Dodwell. For the BBC series River Journeys	BBC / PBS / ABC Australia	BAFTA Award for ‘Best Factual Series’
1973	Jimmy Hoffa Comes Back		One of the last interviews with the notorious leader of America's largest trade union before he went mysteriously missing, presumed murdered.	BBC (Midweek)	
1973	Bad Blood - The Tuskegee Syphilis Experiment		Documentary tracking down the survivors of a clinical study in the American South to examine the long term effects of Syphilis who were falsely told by the US Public Health Service that they were being treated for the disease	BBC (Midweek)	
	Regine - Queen of Clubs	1 x 40 mins	Documentary on the legendary singer and international night club entrepreneur	BBC (Larger than life)	
1975	John Bloom Goes West		Documentary tracking down the controversial washing machine millionaire starting a new life in Lost Angeles	BBC Midweek / BBC 1 Special	
1972	Ulster Veterans – Forgotten Men		The lives of some of the 1,000 men badly wounded fighting in Northern Ireland.	BBC (Midweek)	
