= Watergate break-in motives =

Historical debate

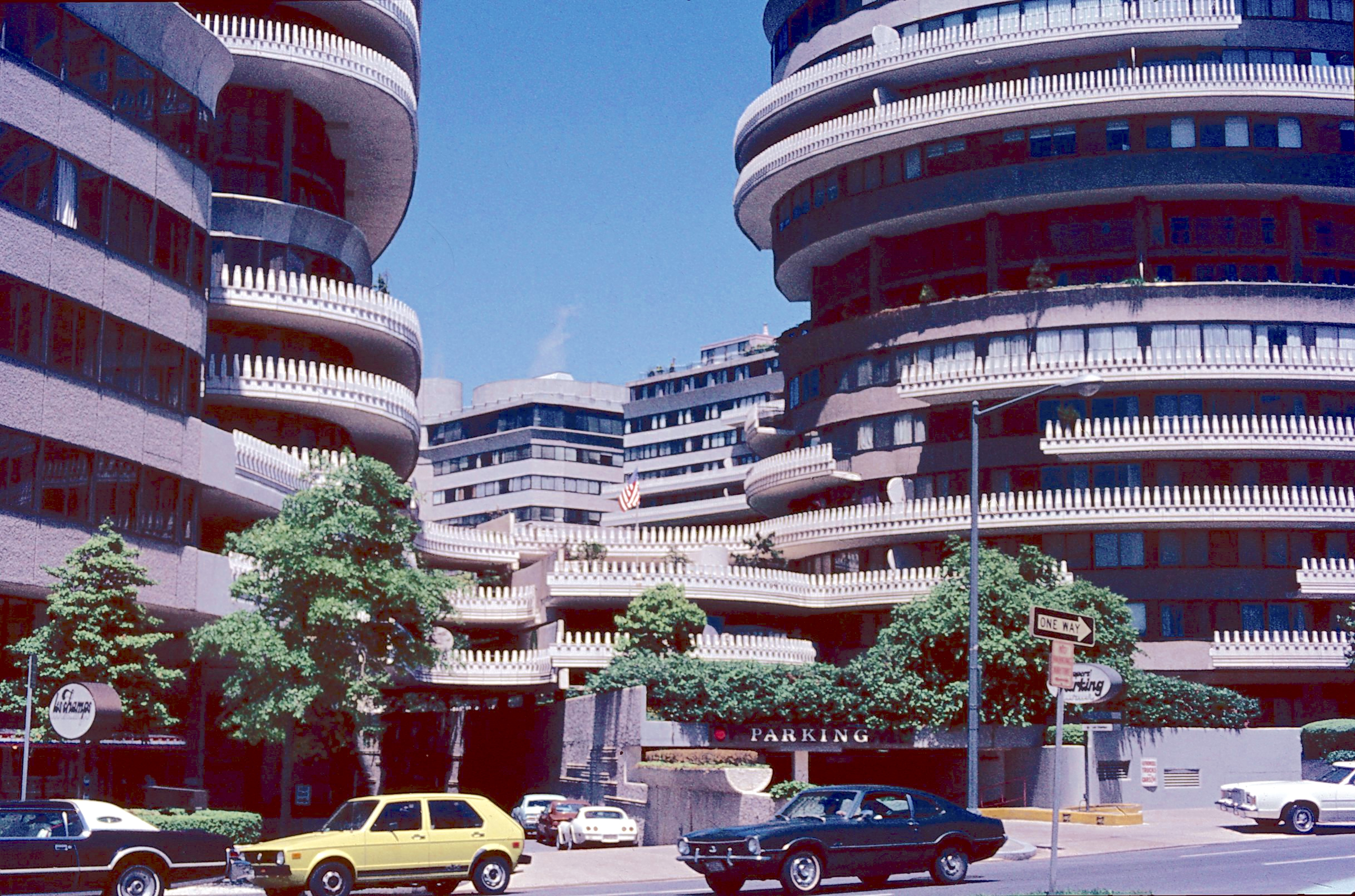
Watergate's office buildings and parking garage entrance (pictured 1982), through which the Plumbers broke into the Democratic National Committee office on May 28 and June 17, 1972

The purpose of the Watergate break-in and who ordered the operation has never been established and has spawned extensive research and speculation. No one was ever charged for ordering the burglary, and the burglars' accounts conflict. The simplest theory is that Watergate was an incompetent break-in to bug Democratic National Committee chair Larry O'Brien, emerging from White House paranoia, and that burglars E. Howard Hunt, G. Gordon Liddy, and James McCord were overzealous and acted without proper oversight.

According to journalist Garrett Graff, the burglars may have had "two or even three distinct and separate motives" and deceived even each other. Theories range from a sexpionage operation to a CIA plot.

== Background ==
The purpose of the Watergate break-in and who ordered the operation has never been established and has spawned conspiracist literature akin to that on the Kennedy assassination. No one was ever charged for ordering the burglary, and the Plumbers' accounts conflict. According to Graff, the burglars may have had "two or even three distinct and separate motives" and deceived even each other. The simplest and "official" theory is that Watergate was an incompetent break-in to bug Larry O'Brien, emerging from White House paranoia, and that Hunt, Liddy, and McCord were overzealous and acted without proper oversight.

Alternative theories often focus on the bugging of the relatively minor staffer R. Spencer Oliver, which investigators could not explain. Although White House Counsel John Dean said that Oliver was accidentally bugged, the FBI found that Martinez carried a key matching the locked desk of Oliver's secretary. One of the D.C. officers that arrested the burglars later said that "We wouldn't be sitting around again with all the puzzling and all the mysteries had we taken the time to find out what that key was about."

== Kompromat ==
=== On Democrats ===
A common theory argues that the burglars sought "dirt" on the Democrats, specifically involving illegal Democratic finances or sexual scandals. Both Dean and Magruder believe that the Democrats were "cutting deals" with donors to fund their convention: Dean cites Haldeman's note after meeting Nixon to check "where the Democratic money for Miami is coming from". Hunt testified that he told the Cubans to photograph files on finances and contributions: the Cubans believed they were looking for files linking the Democrats to funding from Castro.

=== On Republicans ===
In 1980, Liddy conversely wrote that the break-in's purpose "was to find out what O'Brien had of a derogatory nature about us", suggested to be files on illegal contributions to Nixon, possibly CIA-linked, from the Greek junta or Howard Hughes.

==== Greek contributions ====
In the so-called "Greek connection", Nixon's 1968 campaign received $549,000 from the Greek military junta which was funneled through the Greek intelligence agency, the KYP and then Nixon vice finance chair Thomas Pappas — a Greek-American business magnate. As a result, Nixon publicly supported the Greek junta. Historian Stanley Kutler wrote that the Greek contribution "caused the most anxiety for the longest period of time for the Nixon administration".

Some of the hush money used to bribe the burglars came from Pappas after the White House agreed not to remove the US ambassador to Greece. Pappas was aligned with the junta and said that "I have worked for the CIA anytime that help was requested."

Graff suggests that the burglars may have been trying to identify what Democrats knew about this contribution.

==== Howard Hughes ====
In 1968, O'Brien was appointed by Vice President Hubert Humphrey to serve as the national director of Humphrey's presidential campaign and, separately, by Howard Hughes to serve as Hughes' public-policy lobbyist in Washington. O'Brien was elected national chairman of the DNC in 1968 and 1970. In late 1971, the president's brother, Donald Nixon, was collecting intelligence for his brother at the time and asked John H. Meier, an adviser to Howard Hughes, about O'Brien. In 1956, Donald Nixon had borrowed $205,000 from Howard Hughes and had never repaid the loan. The loan's existence surfaced during the 1960 presidential election campaign, embarrassing Richard Nixon and becoming a political liability. According to author Donald M. Bartlett, Richard Nixon would do whatever was necessary to prevent another family embarrassment. From 1968 to 1970, Hughes withdrew nearly half a million dollars from the Texas National Bank of Commerce for contributions to both Democrats and Republicans, including presidential candidates Humphrey and Nixon. Hughes wanted Donald Nixon and Meier involved but Nixon opposed this.

Meier told Donald Nixon that he was sure the Democrats would win the election because they had considerable information on Richard Nixon's illicit dealings with Hughes that had never been released, and that it resided with Larry O'Brien. According to Fred Emery, O'Brien had been a lobbyist for Hughes in a Democrat-controlled Congress, and the possibility of his finding out about Hughes' illegal contributions to the Nixon campaign was too much of a danger for Nixon to ignore.

==== Sexual blackmail ====
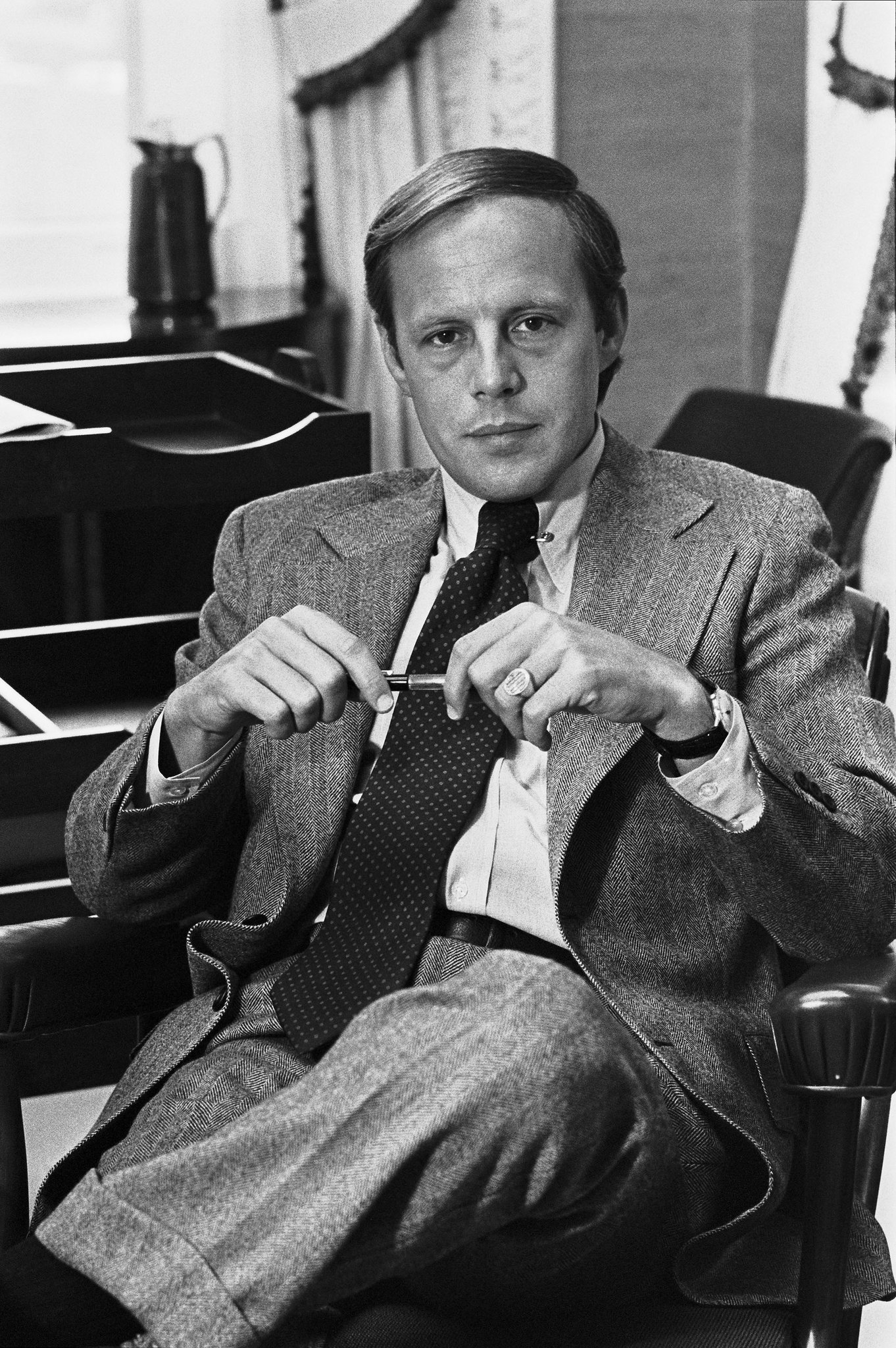
White House Counsel John Dean

A sexual blackmail theory, as advanced in Secret Agenda (1984) and Silent Coup (1992), alleges either a link between Oliver and a high-end escort service—explaining why the minor staffer Oliver was bugged and why Martínez possessed the key to the desk of Oliver's secretary—or that Dean feared Democrat-held files linking his partner to a D.C. escort ring run by Phillip Mackin Bailley, or both.

The trial of the burglars was interrupted when Oliver's lawyer, Charles Morgan, convinced the judge and prosecutors to suspend the trial to stop burglar Baldwin from describing recorded conversations from Oliver's wiretap: an appeals court sealed the transcripts. As of 2022, these remain secret and are, according to Graff, "the last and potentially only chance to [know] whether... the burglary and wiretapping plot included a sexual motive."

According to US Assistant Attorney Jack Rudy, Dean called him on June 9, 1972 and requested that he bring address books seized in an ongoing prostitution probe. Rudy's investigation sought to determine whether a lawyer was forcing women into sex work through compromising photographs. Rudy wished to pursue links to the DNC but said he was stopped by superiors after Watergate. According to Rudy, Dean photocopied the address books.

Liddy and Ehrlichman endorsed this theory, and Colson called it "one of the most plausible explanations". Dean rejected the claims as "baloney".

== CIA ==
Another theory, supported by Haldeman, holds that the CIA sabotaged the break-in to smear Nixon—with whom it had a tense relationship—or to conceal ties to the Bailley escort ring or ally Howard Hughes. In January 1974, according to Colson, Nixon nearly removed CIA Director William Colby over such suspicions; that June, Senator Howard Baker released an inconclusive special report on CIA involvement. Baker said that "Nixon and [CIA Director Richard] Helms have so much on each other, neither of them can breathe."

In addition to each burglars' past involvement in CIA plots, both McCord and Hunt had been CIA agents, Hunt continued to work for a firm that was a CIA cover, and Martínez was actively on the CIA's payroll. The CIA also had unexplained insight into the plot, helped Hunt develop the Fielding photographs, and did not cooperate with investigators.

An additional "sixth man" theory seeks to explain McCord's periodic absences during the burglary and the possible presence of Lou Russell, a CRP security guard allegedly linked to the prostitution ring and CIA. The Washington Post criticized this theory: "This secret CIA operation was so sensitive that McCord and Russell set out to sabotage the break-in to insure that the other Watergate burglars wouldn't stumble across it".

== Other theories ==
Another theory noted by Stanley Kutler suggests that Colson and Hunt acted as rogue operatives, proceeding with an unapproved version of Gemstone that, in addition to the Watergate break-ins, involved either the orchestration of the assassination attempt that paralyzed general election rival George Wallace or at least Hunt planting leftist literature at the assassin's home — a theory supported by Seymour Hersh. Lukas writes that, beyond unsubstantiated reports of would-be-assassin Arthur Bremer meeting with Ulasewicz, nothing supports the theory that the Plumbers were involved in Wallace's attempted assassination. According to Hunt, Colson dispatched him to Bremer's Milwaukee apartment after the shooting to "take a look" and to evaluate whether he had leftist motives. Hunt said that Colson canceled the assignment as he was packing. Colson called Hunt's claims "utterly preposterous".

The final major theory, according to Graff, is that the Democrats or Metropolitan Police had advance knowledge of the burglary and "sprung a trap" for the burglars, or were somehow alerted by McCord or Hunt. Proponents note that the Metropolitan squad that arrived were coincidentally vice officers with extensive experience in busting D.C. sex work.
