= Donald Nixon =

Brother of US President Richard Nixon

- Nixon (second from right) in 1969
- Born: Francis Donald Nixon; November 23, 1914; Yorba Linda, California, U.S.
- Died: June 27, 1987 (aged 72); Whittier, California, U.S.
- Spouse: Clara Jane Lemke (m. 1942)
- Children: 3, including Donald
- Parent(s): Hannah Milhous Nixon; Francis A. Nixon
- Relatives: Richard Nixon (brother); Edward Nixon (brother); Pat Nixon (sister-in-law); Edward F. Cox (nephew-in-law); Tricia Nixon Cox (niece); Julie Nixon Eisenhower (niece); Christopher N. Cox (great-nephew); Jennie Eisenhower (great-niece)

Francis Donald Nixon (November 23, 1914 – June 27, 1987) was a younger brother of U.S. President Richard Nixon. Donald Nixon's business dealings—particularly a large 1957 loan from the influential aviation businessman Howard Hughes—led to allegations of nepotism being leveled against Richard Nixon in his political campaigns.

== Family ==
He was the third of five sons:

- Harold Nixon (June 1, 1909 – March 7, 1933)
- Richard Nixon (January 9, 1913 – April 22, 1994)
- Donald Nixon (November 23, 1914 – June 27, 1987)
- Arthur Nixon (May 26, 1918 – August 10, 1925)
- Edward Nixon (May 3, 1930 – February 27, 2019)

== Life ==
Nixon married Clara Jane Lemke (1920–2013) in 1942 and had two sons, Richard C. Nixon and Donald A. Nixon, and a daughter, Lawrene Mae Nixon Anfinson.

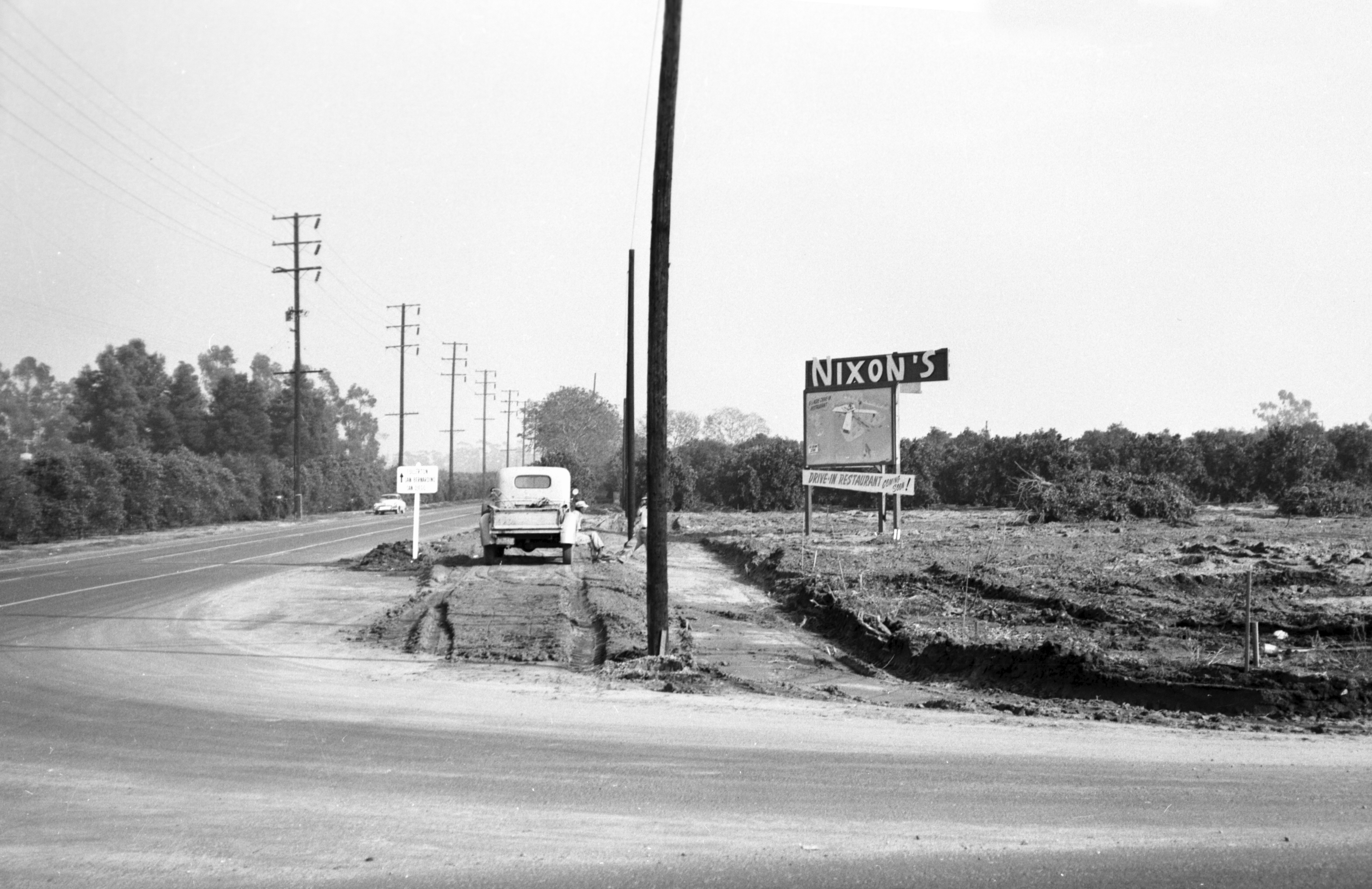
Billboard for Nixon's restaurant, Whittier, CA, circa 1955

In January 1957 Howard Hughes lent Nixon $205,000 (equivalent to $2,350,000 in 2025) to bail out his "Nixon's" drive-in restaurant in Whittier, California. The restaurant went bankrupt less than a year later. Questions about whether this was a political favor dogged Richard Nixon during his campaign for president and later when he sought the governorship of California.

Nixon never lived it down, and one of the many speculated motives for the 1972 Watergate burglary that ultimately led to Richard Nixon's resignation was a desire to find proof that the then-Democratic National Committee chairman Larry O'Brien was also secretly working for Hughes. John H. Meier, one of Hughes' former business advisors, in collaboration with former vice president Hubert Humphrey and others, was using Donald Nixon to feed misinformation to his brother, the President. Meier told Donald that he was sure the Democrats would win the election, since they had a lot of information on Richard Nixon's illicit dealings with Howard Hughes which had never been released, and that Larry O'Brien had the information.

After becoming the U.S. President, Richard Nixon sent a White House investigator, Anthony Ulasewicz, to "rescue" Donald Nixon's son, Donald Nixon Jr., from a hippie commune in the California mountains. Political columnist Jack Anderson revealed the incident in his column of June 21, 1973, and wrote of Ulasewicz, "The burly former private eye persuaded Donald to trim his hair and to return home," and reported that White House aide John Ehrlichman admonished Donald Jr. in a two-hour lecture "to behave himself and do nothing to embarrass the President", his uncle Richard.

In 1974 the staff of the Senate Watergate committee disclosed additional information to support the charge that Charles Rebozo gave or lent part of a $100,000 campaign contribution to President Nixon's personal secretary, Rose Mary Woods, and to Nixon's brothers, Donald and Edward Nixon.

== Media portrayals ==
Donald Nixon was portrayed by Sean Stone in the 1995 Oliver Stone film Nixon.

== Death ==
On June 27, 1987, Donald Nixon died while undergoing hospital treatment for Pneumonia. He was 72 years old.
