= Trixolan =

Fake drug

Trixolan (TX) is a purportedly therapeutic agent based on Viroxan, a citronella-based substance used by Stephen Herman, a Californian doctor who used it to treat AIDS patients. State medical officials stated that the drug hastened the deaths of at least two AIDS patients. Herman surrendered his medical license in 1991 when prosecutors agreed they would, in return, drop civil charges of gross negligence, incompetence, dishonesty and other offenses. In 1994, in the first AIDS medical fraud case to come to trial in the United States, a Los Angeles County jury ordered two doctors and a hospital that used Viroxan to pay five patients a total of $2.7 million. Herman had been dropped from the suit when he declared bankruptcy.

Trixolan was linked in headlines to American fugitive Robert Lee Vesco and to Donald A. Nixon, President Richard Nixon's nephew. In the early 1980s Donald Nixon's wife contracted breast cancer and was treated with chemotherapy. In the search for a remedy for her cancer, he met with Dr. Stephen Herman, who claimed that Viroxan could boost the immune system and could get rid of many diseases, including cancer. Donald Nixon gave his wife Trixolan and claimed that it cured his wife's cancer and her arthritis.

Nixon asked the Federal Government for $300 million to test the drug. When no funding was forthcoming, he formed a partnership with Vesco and other partners. Nixon was placed under house arrest in Cuba when he went to visit Vesco — who had fled to Cuba to avoid prosecution for securities fraud — for financing.

Purportedly, Vesco introduced Nixon to Fidel Castro and his brother Raul, and Fidel set up four laboratories in Cuba with his nephew Antonio Fraga Castro as head of the project to develop the formula. They claim Trixolan suppresses cancer and cures AIDS, arthritis and the common cold - all of which are diseases related to immunity.

Castro imprisoned Vesco in 1996, convicting him of fraud, saying he had defrauded a state-run biotechnology laboratory run by Castro's nephew in a scheme to "develop" TX. Associated Press reported that he had been convicted of marketing Trixolan without government permission. Vesco died of lung cancer in 2007.
