= Ed Nixon =

Ed Nixon may refer to:

- Edward Nixon (1930–2019), American entrepreneur and brother of former U.S. President Richard Nixon
- Edgar Nixon, American civil rights leader
