= Nixon (film) =

1995 film by Oliver Stone

- Theatrical release poster
- Directed by: Oliver Stone
- Written by: Stephen J. Rivele; Christopher Wilkinson; Oliver Stone
- Produced by: Clayton Townsend; Oliver Stone; Andrew G. Vajna
- Starring: Anthony Hopkins; Joan Allen; Powers Boothe; Ed Harris; Bob Hoskins; E. G. Marshall; David Paymer; David Hyde Pierce; Paul Sorvino; Mary Steenburgen; J. T. Walsh; James Woods
- Cinematography: Robert Richardson
- Edited by: Hank Corwin; Brian Berdan
- Music by: John Williams
- Production companies: Hollywood Pictures; Cinergi Pictures; Illusion Entertainment Group
- Distributed by: Buena Vista Pictures Distribution (North America/South America/Germany/Japan); Cinergi Productions (International, via Summit Entertainment)
- Release date: December 22, 1995
- Running time: 192 minutes
- Country: United States
- Languages: English; Chinese; Russian
- Budget: $44 million
- Box office: $13.7 million (US/Canada)

Nixon is a 1995 American epic historical drama film directed by Oliver Stone, produced by Stone, Clayton Townsend, and Andrew G. Vajna, and written by Stone, Christopher Wilkinson, and Stephen J. Rivele. It tells the story of the political and personal life of former U.S. President Richard Nixon, played by Anthony Hopkins.

The film portrays Nixon as a complex and in many respects admirable, albeit deeply flawed, person. Nixon begins with a disclaimer that the film is "an attempt to understand the truth ... based on numerous public sources and on an incomplete historical record". The cast also includes Joan Allen, Annabeth Gish, Marley Shelton, Bai Ling, Powers Boothe, J. T. Walsh, E. G. Marshall, Sam Waterston, James Woods, Paul Sorvino, Bob Hoskins, Larry Hagman, Ed Harris, and David Hyde Pierce, plus archival appearances from political figures such as President Bill Clinton in television footage from the Nixon funeral service.

The film received generally favorable reviews from critics, with Hopkins' performance receiving particular praise. Despite this, the film grossed only $13.6 million domestically against a $44 million budget, making it one of the biggest box-office bombs of 1995. The film was nominated for four Academy Awards: Best Actor (Anthony Hopkins), Best Supporting Actress (Joan Allen), Best Original Score (John Williams), and Best Original Screenplay. This was Stone's second of three films about the presidents of the United States, after JFK, which was about the assassination of John F. Kennedy, and W., which was about George W. Bush.

== Plot ==
In 1972, the White House Plumbers break into The Watergate and are subsequently arrested. Eighteen months later in December 1973, Richard Nixon's Chief of Staff, Alexander Haig, brings Nixon audio tapes for Nixon to listen to. The two men discuss the Watergate scandal and the resulting chaos. After discussing the death of J. Edgar Hoover, Nixon uses profanity when discussing John Dean, James McCord, and others involved in Watergate. As Haig turns to leave, Nixon asks Haig why he has not been given a pistol to commit suicide like an honorable soldier.

A majority of the movie is told through flashbacks of Nixon's tapes. Nixon starts the taping system, which triggers memories that begin a series of flashbacks within the film. The first begins on June 23, 1972, about one week after the break-in, during a meeting with H. R. Haldeman, John Ehrlichman and Dean. Ehrlichman and Dean leave, and Nixon speaks the "smoking gun" tape to Haldeman.

Henry Kissinger figures prominently in the film, beginning as a respected professor and later as National Security Adviser and Secretary of State. Throughout the film, there is a battle with Nixon and his staff over who Kissinger actually is—is he a leaker who only cares about his reputation in the press, or is he a loyal subject who follows the president's orders? Although many cabinet members blame Kissinger for the leaks, Nixon cannot turn his back on him.

While at the height of his political career, Nixon thinks back to childhood and how his parents raised him and his brothers. Two of his brothers died of tuberculosis at a young age and this deeply impacted the president. The film covers most aspects of Nixon's life and political career and implies that he and his wife abused alcohol and prescription medications. Nixon's health problems, including his bout of phlebitis and pneumonia during the Watergate crisis, are also shown; his heavy use of medications is sometimes attributed to these.

The film hints at some kind of responsibility, real or imagined, that Nixon felt towards the John F. Kennedy assassination through references to the Bay of Pigs Invasion, the implication being that the mechanisms set into place for the invasion by Nixon during his 8-year term as Dwight D. Eisenhower's vice president spiraled out of control to culminate in Kennedy's assassination and eventually Watergate.

The film ends with Nixon's resignation and departure from the lawn of the White House on the helicopter, Army One. Real-life footage of Nixon's state funeral in Yorba Linda, California plays out over the extended end credits, and all living ex-presidents at the time—Gerald Ford, Jimmy Carter, Ronald Reagan, and George H. W. Bush—as well as then-president Bill Clinton, are shown in attendance.

== Cast ==
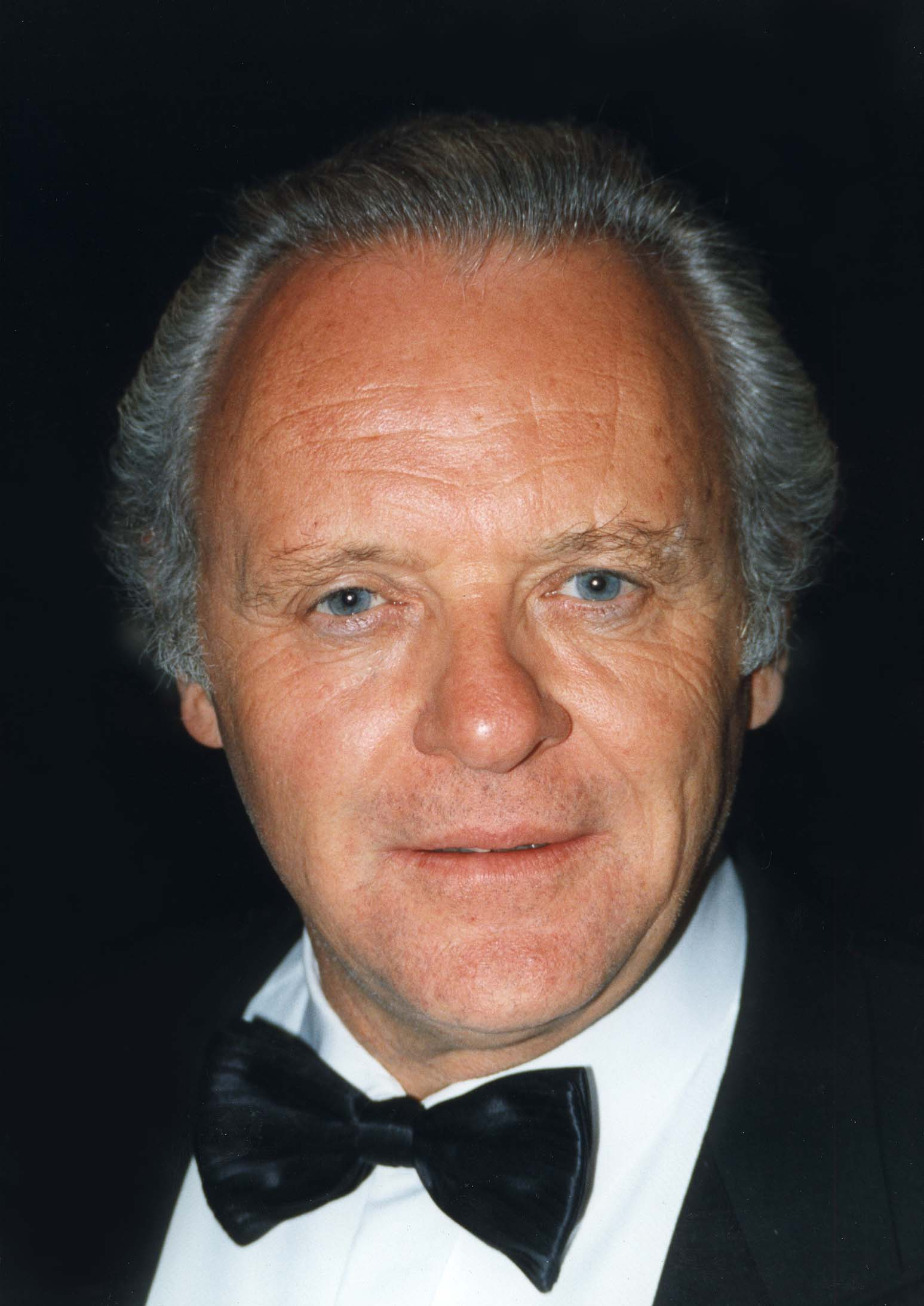
Anthony Hopkins (left) plays President Richard Nixon

=== First family ===
- Anthony Hopkins as Richard Nixon
- Joan Allen as Pat Nixon
- Annabeth Gish as Julie Nixon Eisenhower
- Marley Shelton as Tricia Nixon Cox

=== White House staff and cabinet ===
- James Woods as H. R. Haldeman, the Chief of Staff and Nixon's closest advisor.
- J. T. Walsh as John Ehrlichman, Domestic Affairs Advisor, he is the first to notice the president's paranoia and thinks Nixon is breaking the law.
- Paul Sorvino as Henry Kissinger, National Security Advisor and later Secretary of State, he is rumored to be self-serving and a leaker.
- Powers Boothe as General Alexander Haig, a U.S. Army General who served under Henry Kissinger as Deputy National Security Advisor and later the president's White House Chief of Staff during the Watergate scandal.
- E. G. Marshall as John N. Mitchell, Nixon's longtime friend and later Attorney General, whom he refers to as "family". He is the first to be set up to take the fall for Watergate.
- David Paymer as Ron Ziegler, White House Press Secretary that Nixon pushes around, both literally and figuratively.
- David Hyde Pierce as John Dean, White House Counsel and the first to testify in front of Congress on Watergate and the cover up.
- Kevin Dunn as Charles Colson, White House Counsel and later Director of Public Liaison, also a close advisor to Nixon.
- Saul Rubinek as Herbert G. Klein, Nixon's campaign press secretary in 1960 and 1962; then the Director of Communications.
- Fyvush Finkel as Murray Chotiner, one of Nixon's mentors and chairman of his campaigns in 1960, 1962, 1968, and 1972.
- Tony Plana as Manolo Sanchez, Nixon's valet and a trusted contact.
- James Karen as William P. Rogers, Nixon's Secretary of State who urges Nixon not to bomb Cambodia. Nixon thinks he is weak and a leaker and excludes him on international meetings, deferring to Kissinger instead.
- Richard Fancy as Melvin Laird, Secretary of Defense who concurs with Rogers to not bomb Cambodia.

=== Nixon family ===
- Mary Steenburgen as Hannah Milhous Nixon, Richard's passive but strong Quaker mother.
- Tony Goldwyn as Harold Nixon, Richard's brother who dies of tuberculosis.
- Tom Bower as Francis Nixon, Richard's overbearing and rough father.
- Sean Stone as Donald Nixon, Richard's younger brother.
- Joshua Preston as Arthur Nixon
- Corey Carrier as adolescent Richard Nixon
- David Barry Gray as young adult Richard Nixon

=== White House plumbers ===
- Ed Harris as E. Howard Hunt, a former CIA operative who was attached to the Bay of Pigs.
- John Diehl as G. Gordon Liddy
- Robert Beltran as Frank Sturgis

=== Other cast members ===
- Bob Hoskins as J. Edgar Hoover, director of the FBI.
- Brian Bedford as Clyde Tolson, Hoover's partner and Deputy FBI Director.
- Madeline Kahn as Martha Beall Mitchell, John Mitchell's gregarious wife who insists Dick Nixon was nothing but a crook and ruined her family name. In real life, Martha made several phone calls to reporters over Watergate and her husband.
- Edward Herrmann as Nelson Rockefeller, a wealthy presidential candidate in 1964. He warns Nixon of being too extreme in his ideology. Though not depicted in the movie, Rockefeller would become Gerald Ford's Vice President.
- Dan Hedaya as Trini Cardoza, based upon Bebe Rebozo, close advisor to Nixon.
- Bridgette Wilson as Sandy
- Ric Young as Mao Zedong, the ruler of Communist China.
- Bai Ling as Mao's interpreter
- Boris Sichkin as Leonid Brezhnev, a Soviet leader.
- Sam Waterston as Richard Helms (scenes present only in director's cut), the Director of the CIA who knows more about Nixon than Nixon feels comfortable knowing. The two of them go back to the Bay of Pigs fiasco.
- Joanna Going as young student
- Tony Lo Bianco as Johnny Roselli, a gangster Nixon knew in Cuba who was attached to the Castro assassination attempt.
- George Plimpton as the President's lawyer.
- Larry Hagman as "Jack Jones" - Unlike some other characters in the film who represent actual people, Jack Jones, a billionaire investment banker and real estate tycoon, is a composite character, who is emblematic of "big business" in general. The character may be a reference to Nixon's meetings with Clint Murchison Sr., although he also illuminates Nixon's relationships with Howard Hughes, H. L. Hunt and other entrepreneurs.
- Michael Chiklis as the TV director
- Jack Wallace as the football coach
- John C. McGinley as the salesmen in the Dept. of Labor training film
- James Pickens Jr. as an audience agitator

== Production ==
=== Origins ===
Eric Hamburg, former speechwriter and staff member of the House Foreign Affairs Committee, got the idea of a film about Richard Nixon after having dinner with Oliver Stone. Originally, Stone had been developing two projects – the musical Evita and a movie about Panamanian dictator Manuel Noriega. When neither was made, Stone turned his attention to a biopic about Nixon. The former President's death on April 22, 1994, was also a key factor in Stone's decision to make a Nixon film. He pitched the film to Warner Bros., but, according to Stone, they saw it, "as a bunch of unattractive older white men sitting around in suits, with a lot of dialogue and not enough action".

In 1993, Hamburg mentioned the idea of a Nixon film to writer Stephen J. Rivele with the concept being that they would incorporate all of the politician's misdeeds, both known and speculative. Rivele liked the idea and had previously thought about writing a play exploring the same themes. Hamburg encouraged Rivele to write a film instead and with his screenwriting partner, Christopher Wilkinson, they wrote a treatment in November 1993. They conceived of a concept referred to as "the Beast", which Wilkinson describes as "a headless monster that lurches through postwar history," a metaphor for a system of dark forces that resulted in the assassinations of John F. Kennedy, Robert F. Kennedy, and Martin Luther King Jr., the Vietnam War, and helped Nixon's rise to power and his fall from it as well. Stone said in an interview that Nixon realizes that "the Beast" "is more powerful than he is. We can't get into it that much, but we hint at it so many times—the military-industrial complex, the forces of money". In another interview, the director elaborates,

I see the Beast in its essence as a System ... which grinds the individual down ... it's a System of checks and balances that drives itself off: 1) the power of money and markets; 2) State power, Government power; 3) corporate power, which is probably greater than state power; 4) the political process, or election through money, which is therefore in tow to the System; and 5) the media, which mostly protects the status quo and their ownership's interests.

It was this concept that convinced Stone to make Nixon and he told Hamburg to hire Rivele and Wilkinson. Stone commissioned the first draft of the film's screenplay in the fall of 1993. Rivele and Wilkinson delivered the first draft of their script on June 17, 1994, the anniversary of the Watergate scandal. Stone loved the script but felt that the third act and the ending needed more work. They wrote another draft and delivered it on August 9, the 20th anniversary of Nixon's resignation.

=== Pre-production ===
Stone immersed himself in research with the help of Hamburg. With Hamburg and actors Anthony Hopkins and James Woods, Stone flew to Washington, D.C., and interviewed the surviving members of Nixon's inner circle: lawyer Leonard Garment and Attorney General Elliot Richardson. He also interviewed Robert McNamara, a former Secretary of Defense under the Kennedy and Johnson administrations. The director also hired Alexander Butterfield, a key figure in the Watergate scandal who handled the flow of paper to the President, as a consultant to make sure that the Oval Office was realistically depicted, former deputy White House counsel John Sears, and John Dean, who made sure that every aspect of the script was accurate and wrote a few uncredited scenes for the film. Butterfield also appears in a few scenes as a White House staffer. To research their roles, Powers Boothe, David Hyde Pierce and Paul Sorvino talked to their real-life counterparts, but J.T. Walsh decided not to contact John Ehrlichman because he had threatened to sue after reading an early version of the script and was not happy with how he was portrayed. Hopkins watched a lot of documentary footage on Nixon. At night, he would go to sleep with the Nixon footage playing, letting it seep into his subconscious. Hopkins said, "It's taking in all this information and if you're relaxed enough, it begins to take you over."

Stone originally had a three-picture deal with Regency Enterprises which included JFK, Heaven and Earth, and Natural Born Killers. After the success of Killers, Arnon Milchan, head of Regency, signed Stone for three more motion pictures. Stone could make any film up to a budget of $42.5 million. When Stone told Milchan that he wanted to make Nixon, Milchan, who was not keen on the idea, told Stone that he would only give him $35 million, thinking that this would cause Stone to abandon the project. Stone took the project to Hungarian financier Andrew G. Vajna who had a co-financing deal with Disney. Vajna's company, Cinergi Pictures, were willing to finance the $38 million film. This angered Milchan who claimed that Nixon was his film because of his three-picture deal with Stone and he threatened to sue. He withdrew after Stone paid him an undisclosed amount. Stone was finalizing the film's budget a week before shooting was to begin. He made a deal with Cinergi and Disney's Hollywood Pictures in order to supply the $43 million budget. To cut costs, Stone leased the White House sets from Rob Reiner's film The American President.

=== Casting ===
Hopkins was not considered a natural choice for the role, with British film critic Barry Norman telling Hopkins it was like "casting Paul Newman as Harold Macmillan". While Stone had wanted to cast Hopkins based on his recent performances in The Remains of the Day and Shadowlands, Hopkins took some time before accepting the role, noting the difficulties in a British actor replicating American speech patterns. Stone reassured Hopkins, telling him that he wanted him for the role and that being a former alcoholic and being Welsh meant there was "something dark" about him, that he was an "outsider". In a later interview Stone said, "The isolation of Tony is what struck me. The loneliness. I felt that was the quality that always marked Nixon." When the actor met the director he got the impression that Stone was "one of the great bad boys of American pop culture, and I might be a fool to walk away." Ultimately, Hopkins was convinced to take on the role and "impersonate the soul of Nixon were the scenes in the film when he talks about his mother and father. That affected me." Hopkins wore a hair piece and false teeth "to hint at a physical resemblance to Nixon".

The studio did not like Stone's choice to play Nixon and wanted Tom Hanks or Jack Nicholson – two of Stone's original choices. The director also considered Gene Hackman, Robin Williams, Gary Oldman, and Tommy Lee Jones. Stone met with Warren Beatty, but Beatty declined as he felt that "Nixon was not treated compassionately". When Beatty was thinking about doing the film, he insisted on doing a reading of the script with an actress and Joan Allen was flown in from New York City. Afterwards, Beatty told Stone that he had found his Pat Nixon.

=== Principal photography ===
The film began shooting on May 1, 1995, but there was a week of pre-shooting at the end of April to film scenes that would be used as part of a mock documentary about Nixon's career. Early on during principal photography, Hopkins was intimidated by the amount of dialogue he had to learn, that was being added and changed all the time as he recalled, "There were moments when I wanted to get out, when I wanted to just do a nice Knots Landing or something." Sorvino told him that his accent was all wrong. Sorvino claims he told Hopkins that he thought "there was room for improvement" and that he would be willing to help him. Woods says that Sorvino told Hopkins that he was "doing the whole thing wrong" and that he was an "expert" who could help him. Woods recalls that Sorvino took Hopkins to lunch and then he quit that afternoon. Hopkins told Stone that he wanted to quit the production but the director managed to convince him to stay. According to the actors, this was all good-natured joking. Woods said, "I'd always tell him how great he was in Psycho. I'd call him Lady Perkins all the time instead of Sir Anthony Hopkins."

In Spring of 1994, Time magazine reported that an early draft of the screenplay linked Nixon to the assassination of President John F. Kennedy. The facts contained in the script were based on research from various sources, including documents, transcripts and hours of footage from the Nixon White House. Dean said about the film's accuracy: "In the larger picture, it reflected accurately what happened." Stone addressed the criticism of fictional material in the film, saying, "The material we invented was not done haphazardly or whimsically, it was based on research and interpretation." John Taylor, head of the Nixon Presidential Library, leaked a copy of the script to Richard Helms, former Director of the CIA, who threatened to sue the production. In response, Stone cut out all scenes with Helms from the theatrical print and claimed that he did for "artistic reasons" at that time; but years later, Stone admitted he regretted this decision. Stone eventually reinstated this footage on the director's cut home video release.

During the post-production phase, Stone had his editors in three different rooms with the scenes from the film revolving from one room to another, "depending on how successful they were". If one editor wasn't successful with a scene then it went to another. Stone said that it was "the most intense post- I've ever done, even more intense than JFK" because they were screening the film three times a week, making changes in 48–72 hours, rescreening the film and then making another 48 hours of changes.

=== Music ===
Nixon: Original Motion Picture Soundtrack

Film score by John Williams
- Released: 1995
- Genre: Soundtrack
- Length: 47:23
- Producer: John Williams

Professional ratings
Review scores
Source	Rating
Allmusic	3.5/5 stars
Filmtracks	2/5 stars
Movie Wave	4/5 stars

The score was composed and conducted by John Williams, who previously worked with Stone on Born on the Fourth of July and JFK, and performed by the Hollywood Studio Symphony.

All music is composed by John Williams, except where indicated.

Nixon: Original Motion Picture Soundtrack
No.	Title	Lyrics	Music	Length
1.	"The 1960s: The Turbulent Years"			5:01
2.	"Main Title... The White House Gate"			4:15
3.	"Growing Up in Whittier"			2:40
4.	"The Ellsburg Break-in and Watergate"			2:40
5.	"Love Field: Dallas, November 1963"			4:51
6.	"Losing a Brother"			3:17
7.	"The Battle Hymn of the Republic"	Julia Ward Howe	William Steffe	1:03
8.	"Making a Comeback"			2:20
9.	"Track 2 and the Bay of Pigs"			4:46
10.	"The Miami Convention, 1968"			3:18
11.	"The Meeting with Mao"			3:09
12.	""I Am That Sacrifice""			4:49
13.	"The Farewell Scene"			5:00

== Reception ==
=== Box office ===
In its opening weekend, Nixon grossed a total of $2.2 million in 514 theaters in the United States and Canada. The film grossed a total of $13.6 million in the United States and Canada, less than its $44 million budget.

=== Critical response ===
On Rotten Tomatoes Nixon has a 76% approval rating, based reviews from 63 critics, with an average score of 6.8/10. The site's consensus states: "Much like its subject's time in office, Nixon might have ended sooner—but what remains is an engrossing, well-acted look at the rise and fall of a fascinating political figure." Metacritic gave the film a score of 66 based on 22 reviews, indicating "generally favorable reviews". Audiences surveyed by CinemaScore gave the film a grade "B" on scale of A+ to F.

External videos
- Panel discussion on Nixon with John W. Dean, Leonard Garment, Haynes Johnson, Robert Scheer, Helen Thomas, NPR film critic Pat Dowell, and American University School of Communication Dean Sanford Ungar, January 31, 1996, C-SPAN

Two days before the film was released in theaters, the Richard Nixon Library and birthplace in Yorba Linda, California issued a statement on behalf of the Nixon family, calling parts of the film "reprehensible" and that it was designed to "defame and degrade President and Mrs. Nixon's memories in the mind of the American public." This statement was based on a published copy of the script. The statement also criticized Stone's depiction of Nixon's private life, that of his childhood, and his part in planning the assassination of Fidel Castro. Stone responded that his "purpose in making the film, Nixon was neither malicious nor defamatory", and was an attempt to gain "a fuller understanding of the life and career of Richard Nixon – the good and the bad, the triumphs and the tragedies, and the legacy he left his nation and the world."

Some critics took Stone to task for portraying Nixon as an alcoholic, though Stone says that was based on information from books by Stephen Ambrose, Fawn Brodie, and Tom Wicker. Film critic Roger Ebert praised the film for how it took "on the resonance of classic tragedy. Tragedy requires the fall of a hero, and one of the achievements of Nixon is to show that greatness was within his reach." Ebert also placed the film on his list of the top ten films of the year. Janet Maslin from The New York Times praised Anthony Hopkins' performance and "his character's embattled outlook and stiff, hunched body language with amazing skill."

Mick LaSalle in the San Francisco Chronicle, felt that "the problem here isn't accuracy. It's absurdity. Hopkins' exaggerated portrayal of Nixon is the linchpin of a film that in its conception and presentation consistently veers into camp". Richard Corliss, in his review for Time, also had a problem with Hopkins' portrayal: "Hopkins, though, is a failure. He finds neither the timbre of Nixon's plummy baritone, with its wonderfully false attempts at intimacy, nor the stature of a career climber who, with raw hands, scaled the mountain and was still not high or big enough." Peter Travers of Rolling Stone wrote: "It's gripping psychodrama — just don't confuse Nixon with history."

=== Accolades ===
Award	Category	Recipients	Result	Ref.
Academy Awards	Best Actor	Anthony Hopkins	Nominated	
Academy Awards	Best Supporting Actress	Joan Allen	Nominated	
Academy Awards	Best Original Screenplay	Stephen J. Rivele, Oliver Stone & Christopher Wilkinson	Nominated	
Academy Awards	Best Original Score	John Williams	Nominated	
BAFTA Award	Best Actress in a Supporting Role	Joan Allen	Nominated	
Golden Globe Awards	Best Actor – Motion Picture Drama	Anthony Hopkins	Nominated	
Screen Actors Guild Awards	Outstanding Cast in a Motion Picture	Joan Allen, Brian Bedford, Powers Boothe, Kevin Dunn, Fyvush Finkel, Annabeth Gish, Tony Goldwyn, Larry Hagman, Ed Harris, Edward Herrmann, Anthony Hopkins, Bob Hoskins, Madeline Kahn, E. G. Marshall, David Paymer, Paul Sorvino, David Hyde Pierce, Mary Steenburgen, J. T. Walsh, James Woods	Nominated	
Screen Actors Guild Awards	Outstanding Actor in a Leading Role	Anthony Hopkins	Nominated	
Screen Actors Guild Awards	Outstanding Actress in a Leading Role	Joan Allen	Nominated	

Entertainment Weekly ranked Nixon No. 40 on their "50 Best Biopics Ever" list and one of the 25 "Powerful Political Thrillers".

== Home media ==
The theatrical cut of the film was released on DVD on June 15, 1999. A director's cut was released on DVD as part of an Oliver Stone boxset in 2001, running 212 mins and including 28 minutes of previously deleted scenes. Much of the added time consists of two scenes: one in which Nixon meets with Central Intelligence Agency director Richard Helms (played by Sam Waterston) and another on Tricia Nixon's wedding day, where J. Edgar Hoover persuades Nixon to install the taping system in the Oval Office. The Director's Cut was released individually on DVD in 2002. The Director's Cut was re-released by Walt Disney Studios Home Entertainment (branded as Hollywood Pictures Home Entertainment) on DVD and Blu-ray Disc on August 19, 2008, with the first anamorphic widescreen version of the film in North America.
