= Edward F. Cox =

American attorney and politician (born 1946)

Ed Cox
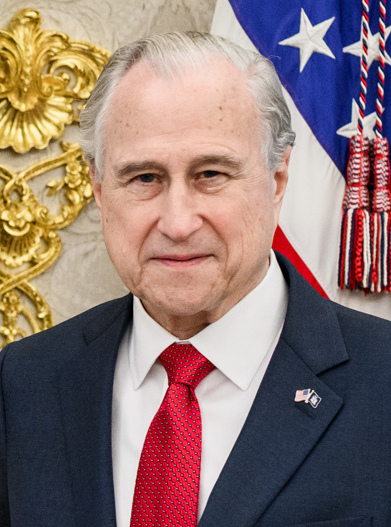
- Cox in 2025

Chair of the New York Republican Party
- Incumbent
- Assumed office March 13, 2023
- Preceded by: Nick Langworthy
- In office September 29, 2009 – July 1, 2019
- Preceded by: Joseph Mondello
- Succeeded by: Nick Langworthy

Personal details
- Born: Edward Ridley Finch Cox; October 2, 1946 (age 79) Southampton, New York, U.S.
- Party: Republican
- Spouse: Tricia Nixon (m. 1971)
- Children: Chris
- Relatives: Richard Nixon (father-in-law); Donald Nixon (uncle-in-law); Edward Nixon (uncle-in-law); Julie Nixon Eisenhower (sister-in-law)
- Education: Princeton University (BA); Harvard University (JD)

Edward Ridley Finch Cox (born October 2, 1946) is an American attorney, politician, and public servant. He serves as chair of the New York Republican State Committee, having previously held that position from 2009 to 2019. Cox is married to Tricia Nixon Cox, daughter of President Richard Nixon and Pat Nixon.

== Early life, family, education, and military service ==
Cox was born to Howard Ellis Cox and Anne Crane Delafield (Finch) Cox in Stony Brook Southampton Hospital in Southampton, New York. He attended Westhampton Beach Elementary School and Allen-Stevenson School in New York City. Cox is named for his grandfather, Judge Edward R. Finch, a prominent New York jurist who served as a Justice of the New York State Supreme Court (1915–1943), Presiding Justice of the New York Supreme Court Appellate Division, First Department, and Associate Judge on the New York Court of Appeals. His father, Howard Ellis Cox, was a decorated World War II aviator, New York lawyer, and Long Island real estate developer.

Cox graduated from the Princeton University Woodrow Wilson School of Public and International Affairs (1968) and Harvard Law School (1972). Cox was battalion commander of his Army ROTC unit at Princeton where he put together and accredited a seminar on war. He completed officer and airborne training at Fort Benning, Georgia and subsequently served as a reserve officer with the 11th Special Forces Group.

== Career ==
=== Private sector ===
Cox was an associate attorney at Cravath, Swaine & Moore. He later practiced law with William Colby, a Nixon administration figure. As of 1997, Cox had become a partner in the Donovan Leisure firm. Subsequently, he was a member of the management committee and chairman of the corporate department at Patterson Belknap Webb & Tyler LLP.

=== Government ===
From 1981 to 1983, Cox served in the Reagan Administration as the Senior Vice President and General Counsel of a government corporation, The United States Synthetic Fuels Corporation. He has served Presidents Richard Nixon and George H. W. Bush in the international arena. He has visited with numerous officials, including heads of state or government, in more than 30 countries.

Cox was commissioner of the Commission on Judicial Nomination (nominating candidates for New York's highest court) from 1991 to 2009 and was chairman of the New York Council of Parks, Recreation and Historic Preservation (1995 to 2008).

Cox was a Trustee of the State University of New York (SUNY) from 1995 to 2009. From 1999 to 2009, as co-chairman and chairman of SUNY's Charter School Committee, Cox founded SUNY's Charter School Institute and led the authorization of fifty charter schools.

In 2006, Cox served as the chairman of newly elected Attorney General Andrew Cuomo's environmental and energy transition team.

=== Publications ===
In 1968 and 1969, Cox researched and co-authored The Nader Report on the Federal Trade Commission (FTC) which spawned "Nader's Raiders" and the rejuvenation of the FTC as a consumer advocate.

Cox's work has appeared in The Wall Street Journal, The New Republic, the Antitrust Law Journal and the New York Post.

=== Politics ===
Cox has assisted Republican candidates in New York at all levels in numerous election cycles. In the 1994 state election, Cox played a key role in electing George Pataki governor and Dennis Vacco attorney general.

Cox was rumored to be considering a run for Governor of New York in 2006 if then-Gov. George Pataki opted not to seek re-election. Pataki did not run again, but Cox later chose instead to seek the seat held by incumbent U.S. Senator Hillary Clinton (D) in the 2006 New York U.S. Senate election. However, after Pataki endorsed a rival Republican--Westchester County District Attorney Jeanine Pirro—for Senate, Cox announced on October 14, 2005, that he was no longer running.

In 2007 and 2008, Cox chaired John McCain's presidential campaign efforts in the State of New York.

==== New York Republican Party Chairman (2009–2019; 2023-present) ====
Cox was elected chairman of the New York State Republican Committee at the committee's meeting on September 30, 2009. Cox had a seven-point agenda for the future when elected chairman.

Cox announced on May 20, 2019, that he was joining President Donald Trump's re-election campaign and that he would not run for re-election as chairman of the state committee. He said, "Serving as Chairman of the NYGOP over the last ten years has been one of the most rewarding chapters of my life, and I will continue to actively help elect more Republicans here in New York'". On July 1, 2019, Erie County Republican Chair Nick Langworthy succeeded Cox.

On March 13, 2023, Cox was again elected to serve as chair of the New York Republican State Committee.

== Personal life ==
In 1971, Cox married Tricia Nixon, the daughter of President Richard Nixon, in a White House Rose Garden ceremony. The wedding was described in Life Magazine as "a union 'akin to American royalty'". The New York Times devoted two columns on its front page to the Cox-Nixon wedding, describing Cox as "tall, fine-boned and handsome", and as "the scion of Easterners whose ancestors go back to the leaders of the American Revolution".

Edward and Tricia Cox have a son, Christopher Nixon Cox. The Coxes reside on Long Island, New York.

Party political offices
Preceded by Joseph Mondello	Chair of the New York Republican Party; 2009–2019	Succeeded by Nick Langworthy
Preceded by Nick Langworthy	Chair of the New York Republican Party; 2023–present	Incumbent
