= John H. Meier =

American financier and business consultant

- Born: September 28, 1933 (age 93); New York, U.S.
- Other name: Johnny Meier
- Known for: Adviser to Howard Hughes, Watergate, his knowledge of the Assassination of Robert F. Kennedy
- Website: Official website

John H. Meier (born September 28, 1933) is an American financier and business consultant now living in Vancouver, Canada. He is noted for his involvement with Howard Hughes, for his behind-the-scenes involvement in events that precipitated President of the United States Richard M. Nixon's resignation, and for his knowledge related to the Assassination of Robert F. Kennedy.

== Background ==
John Meier was born in 1933 and raised on Long Island, New York. He worked briefly for the New York Life Insurance Company before being drafted into the U.S. Army in 1952 and sent to the war in Korea. Upon his honorable discharge in 1954, Meier returned to working for New York Life.

In 1959, Meier was hired in the computer division at Hughes Aircraft and two years later transferred to Hughes Dynamics, a Los Angeles-based information management subsidiary of the Hughes Tool Company."

== Howard Hughes adviser ==
Meier was associated with Howard Hughes for 15 years. While Executives in the Hughes Organization, such as Robert Maheu, never actually met Hughes, Meier was one of the few in the reclusive Hughes's inner circle to have met with him regularly.

President Richard Nixon’s brother Don Nixon testified to the Watergate Committee that John Meier was “the number-two man with Hughes.”

Meier publicised himself as someone closely involved in Hughes's business operations and leveraged his connections to the industrialist. One newspaper called Meier one of two "all-powerful aides who ran Howard's Nevada Empire." In November 1969, Meier resigned from the Hughes organization.

== Watergate ==
Meier has been connected to the events that led to President Richard Nixon's resignation in the wake of the Watergate scandal. Meier told the President's brother, Donald, that he was sure the Democrats would win the election since they had a lot of information on Richard Nixon's illicit dealings with Howard Hughes that had never been released, and that Larry O’Brien had the information. Donald then told his brother that Meier had given the Democrats all the Hughes information that could destroy him, leading to the subsequent Watergate burglary.

== RFK Assassination ==
Meier published decades of his diary entries that detailed his suspicions that Robert Maheu and the Hughes Organization were complicit with the assassination of Robert F. Kennedy (RFK).

=== Legal troubles ===
During his tenure with the Hughes organization, Meier was involved in a controversial mine acquisition project. At the same time as he was in the employ of Hughes, he was also being paid to represent people who were selling claims to Hughes. In just two years, Meier oversaw the transfer of $20 million to purchase over 2,000 mining claims in California and Nevada – some of which were not even owned by the original sellers.

Despite Meier predicting that the mines would produce silver, gold and other valuable metals, according to several geological surveys, many of them were declared "worthless." Meier alleged that Hughes was behind some of the controversy in a complex scheme he hatched in order to convince Moe Dalitz to sell the Stardust Casino. Afterwards it was revealed that over $5 million worth of mine claims that should have gone to Hughes had been passed through tax shelters in Switzerland.

In the 1970s, Meier was indicted and arrested for tax evasion, and the largely worthless mine claims were a source of legal trouble. The Hughes Tool Company was suing him for $8 million and in March 1978 was awarded a judgment of $7.9 million. That summer Meier left for Australia where he was briefly detained, but because he carried with him a diplomatic passport issued by the Kingdom of Tonga – Meier was heavily involved in the financing of infrastructure projects there – the Australian authorities released him. Avoiding return to the United States, he then went to live permanently in Vancouver (Meier had become a Canadian citizen in 1977).

Meier was eventually arrested in Canada and despite his appeals, was extradited to the United States in 1979 and charged with fraud and obstruction of justice. At this time Meier claimed to have in his possession the secret Hughes papers, obtained from John Reynolds, that would exonerate him. However, the court deemed that the papers were a forgery. Meier was sentenced to 30 months in prison, of which he served 21 months.

Meier claimed his innocence throughout his legal troubles and attributed them to political retribution for exposing the illegal activities of the United States Central Intelligence Agency (CIA).

== Other activities ==
Meier became involved in the nuclear disarmament movement, and launched a motion picture production company, Meier-Murray Productions, with fellow Hughes consultant Thomas E. Murray, Jr., which produced two films in the early 1970s.
