= Jennie Eisenhower =

American actress

- Born: August 15, 1978 (age 48); San Clemente, California, U.S.
- Education: Northwestern University
- Occupations: Actress, director, realtor
- Years active: 2003–present
- Political party: Democratic
- Spouses: Anthony Cheslock (m. 2011; div. 2017) Sara Neville (m. 2020)
- Children: 1
- Parent(s): David Eisenhower (father); Julie Nixon Eisenhower (mother)
- Relatives: Dwight Eisenhower (great-grandfather); Richard Nixon (grandfather)

Jennie Elizabeth Eisenhower (born August 15, 1978) is an American actress, director, and realtor. She has performed in Off-Broadway theater productions and in regional theatre, being nominated for seven Barrymore Awards and winning two of them. She has played minor roles in several feature films. She is a great-granddaughter of Dwight D. Eisenhower and granddaughter of Richard Nixon, both presidents of the United States.

== Early life and education ==
Eisenhower was born in San Clemente, California, in 1978, to Julie Nixon Eisenhower and David Eisenhower. Her maternal grandparents were U.S. President Richard Nixon and First Lady Pat Nixon, while her paternal great-grandparents were U.S. President Dwight D. Eisenhower and First Lady Mamie Eisenhower. She grew up near Philadelphia graduating from Conestoga High School and graduated summa cum laude from Northwestern University in Evanston, Illinois. She has a brother, Alex Richard Eisenhower (b. 1980), and a sister, Melanie Catherine Eisenhower (b. 1984).

In 1996, Jennie Eisenhower was presented as a debutante to high society at the International Debutante Ball at the Waldorf Astoria Hotel in New York City.

== Career ==
Eisenhower has performed in Off-Broadway productions and at regional theaters across the United States. For her performances in Philadelphia she has won two Barrymore Awards: Best Actress in a Musical (2009) for Forbidden Broadway's Greatest Hits, and Best Supporting Actress in a Musical (2004) for The Wild Party. She was also nominated for Barrymore Awards for her work in Show Boat at the Media Theatre (2010), The 25th Annual Putnam County Spelling Bee at Theatre Horizon in Norristown (2011), Little Women at Bristol Riverside Theatre (2011), A Grand Night for Singing at the Walnut Street Theatre (2012), Parade at the Arden Theatre (2013), and Bullets Over Broadway (2018).

Other appearances have included Passion at the Arden Theatre Company (2015), Kiss Me, Kate (2014) and Hello, Dolly! (2023) at the Act II Playhouse, and Arsenic and Old Lace (2014), The Humans (2018) and The Best Man (2020) at the Walnut Street Theatre, where she has also directed several productions; Off-Broadway appearances include the original production of Suburb at York Theatre. In the greater Philadelphia region, Eisenhower has directed 1776, Falsettos, and Always...Patsy Cline, among other works.

Eisenhower has appeared in small roles in the films Mona Lisa Smile (2003), Arthur (2011), and The Suspect (2013). She taught theater as an adjunct faculty member at Temple University.

== Personal life ==
Eisenhower narrated the audiobook version of her mother's 2007 book about her grandmother, Pat Nixon: The Untold Story. In 2011, Eisenhower married Anthony (Tony) Cheslock and they have a daughter. They divorced in 2017.

In October 2020, Eisenhower married Sara Neville.

She is a Democrat and voted for Barack Obama in 2012.

== Filmography ==
- Mona Lisa Smile (2003) – Girl at the Station
- Head Space (2006) – TV Correspondent
- Arthur (2011) – Alexis
- The Suspect (2013) – Instructor
- Dispatches From Elsewhere (2020) – Elsewhereian #2
- Law & Order (2022) – Denise Cohen
