= David Eisenhower =

American writer (born 1948)

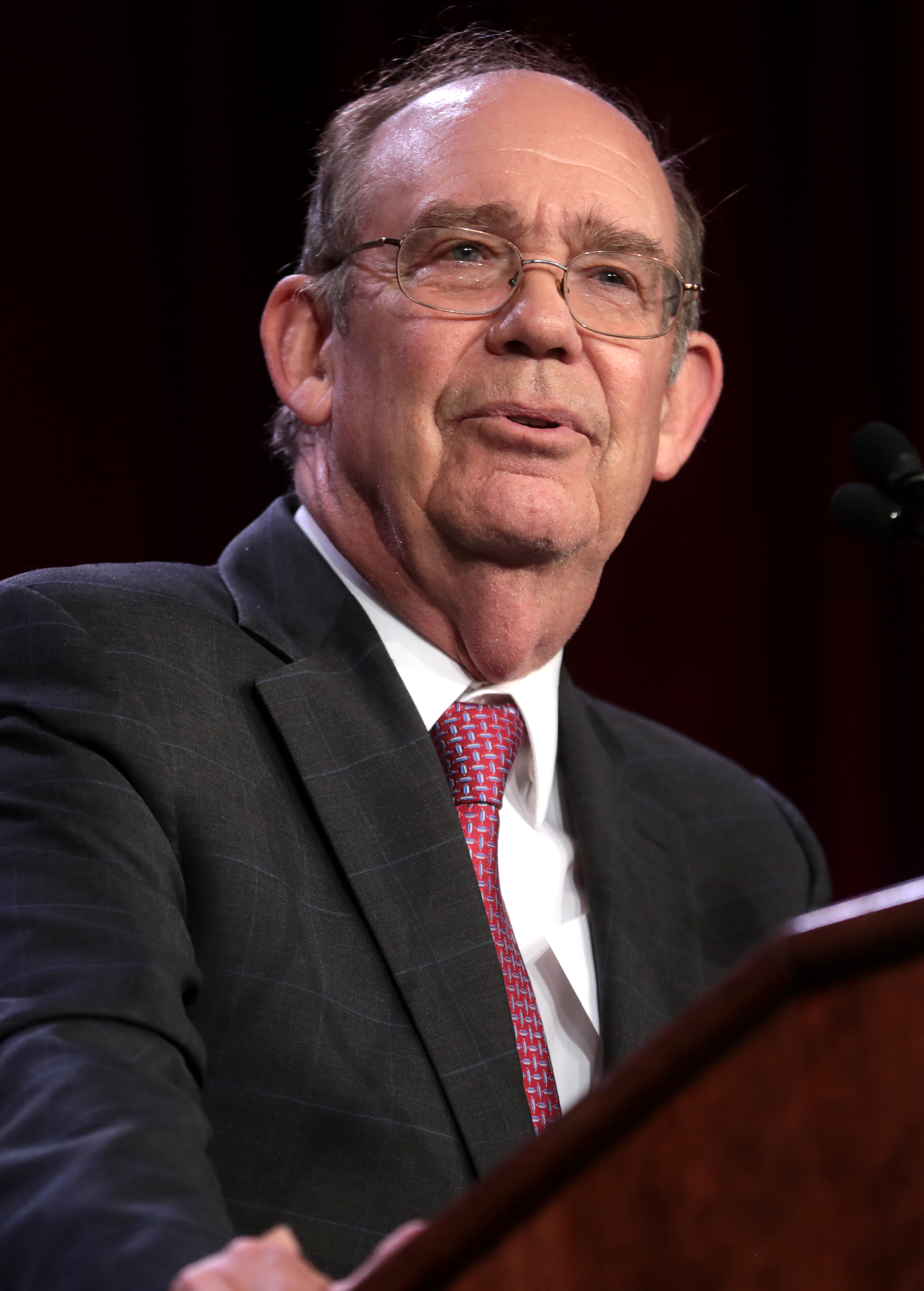
- Eisenhower in 2021
- Born: Dwight David Eisenhower II; March 31, 1948 (age 78); West Point, New York, U.S.
- Education: Amherst College (BA); George Washington University (JD)
- Occupations: Author, professor
- Known for: Partial namesake of Camp David
- Spouse: Julie Nixon (m. 1968)
- Children: 3, including Jennie
- Parents: John Eisenhower; Barbara Thompson
- Relatives: Dwight D. Eisenhower (grandfather); Mamie Eisenhower (grandmother)

Dwight David Eisenhower II (born March 31, 1948) is an American author, public policy fellow, and television host. He is the grandson of President Dwight D. Eisenhower and First Lady Mamie Eisenhower and a son-in-law of President Richard Nixon and First Lady Pat Nixon.

== Early life and family ==
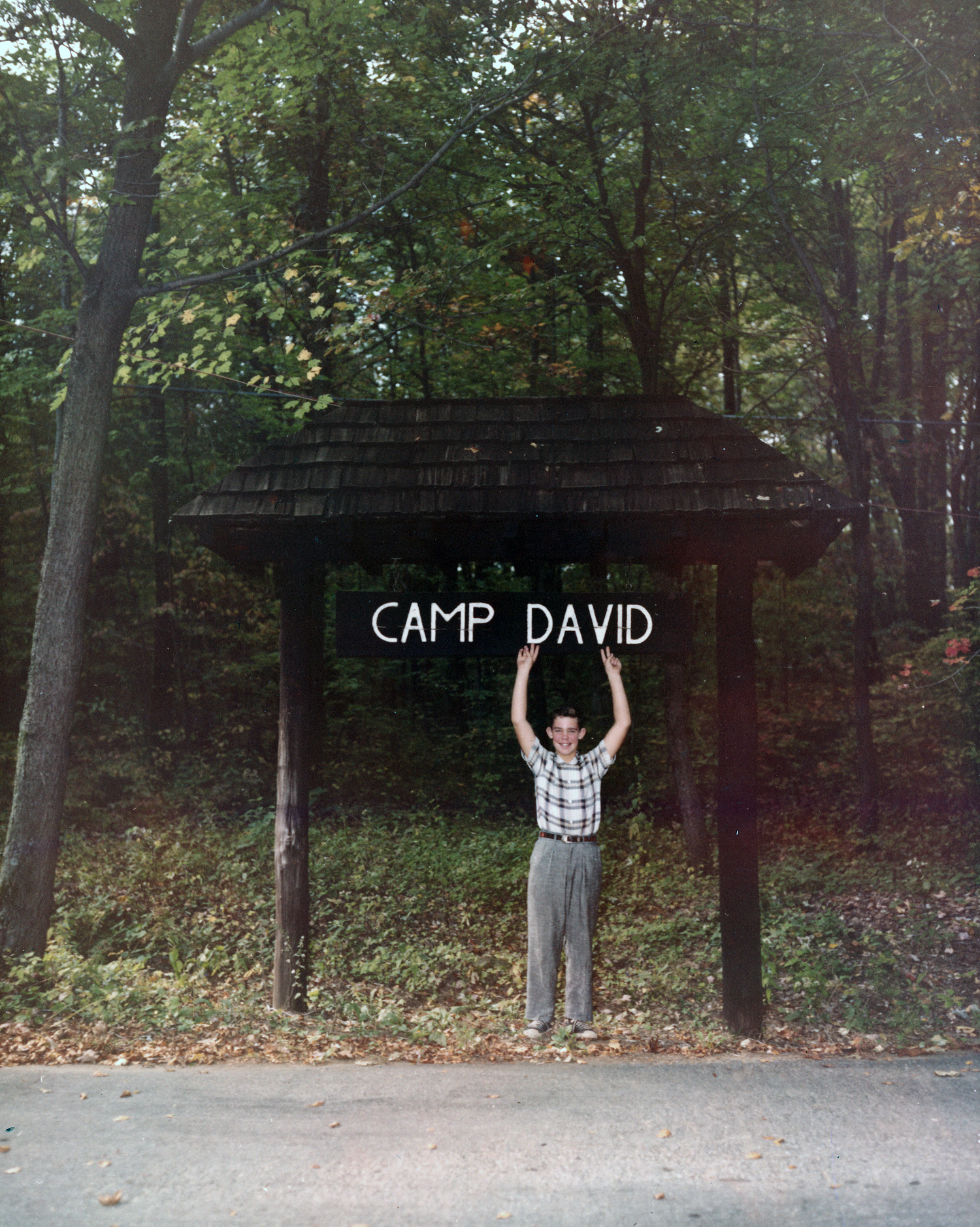
Eisenhower, then age 12, poses with a sign in 1960 at the presidential retreat named after him.

Dwight David Eisenhower II, better known as David, is named after his grandfather, Dwight D. Eisenhower. David Eisenhower was born on March 31, 1948, in West Point, New York, to Barbara (Thompson) and John Eisenhower. He was the Eisenhowers' only son and the eldest of their four children. Eisenhower's father, a U.S. Army officer, would later serve as a brigadier general in the U.S. Army Reserve and as United States Ambassador to Belgium (1969–1971); he was a renowned military historian. His grandfather served as Supreme Allied Commander of the Allied Expeditionary Forces in Europe during World War II, as president of Columbia University (1948–1953), and as the 34th president of the United States (1953–1961).

After assuming the presidency in 1953, Dwight Eisenhower renamed the presidential mountain retreat (formerly Camp Shangri-La) Camp David, both after his grandson and after his father, David Jacob Eisenhower.

== Education ==
Eisenhower graduated from Phillips Exeter Academy in 1966. He received his Bachelor of Arts degree in history cum laude from Amherst College in 1970 where he sang in the collegiate a cappella group the Zumbyes. After college, he served for three years as an officer in the United States Naval Reserve. During this time, he was assigned to the USS Albany in the Mediterranean Sea. He then earned his J.D. degree cum laude from George Washington University Law School in 1976.

== Career ==
Eisenhower was a statistician with the Washington Senators during the 1970 season. He was also a Sunday baseball columnist covering the Philadelphia Phillies for the Philadelphia Bulletin from May to August 1973.

Eisenhower was a finalist for the Pulitzer Prize in history in 1987 for his work Eisenhower At War, 1943–1945 about the Allied leadership during World War II.

Eisenhower has worked as a teaching adjunct and public policy fellow at the Annenberg School for Communication at the University of Pennsylvania. He has also served as co-chair of the Foreign Policy Research Institute's History Institute for Teachers. From 2001 to 2003, he was editor of Orbis, a quarterly published by the institute.

He is the host of a public television series called The Whole Truth with David Eisenhower, distributed by American Public Television.

== Personal life ==
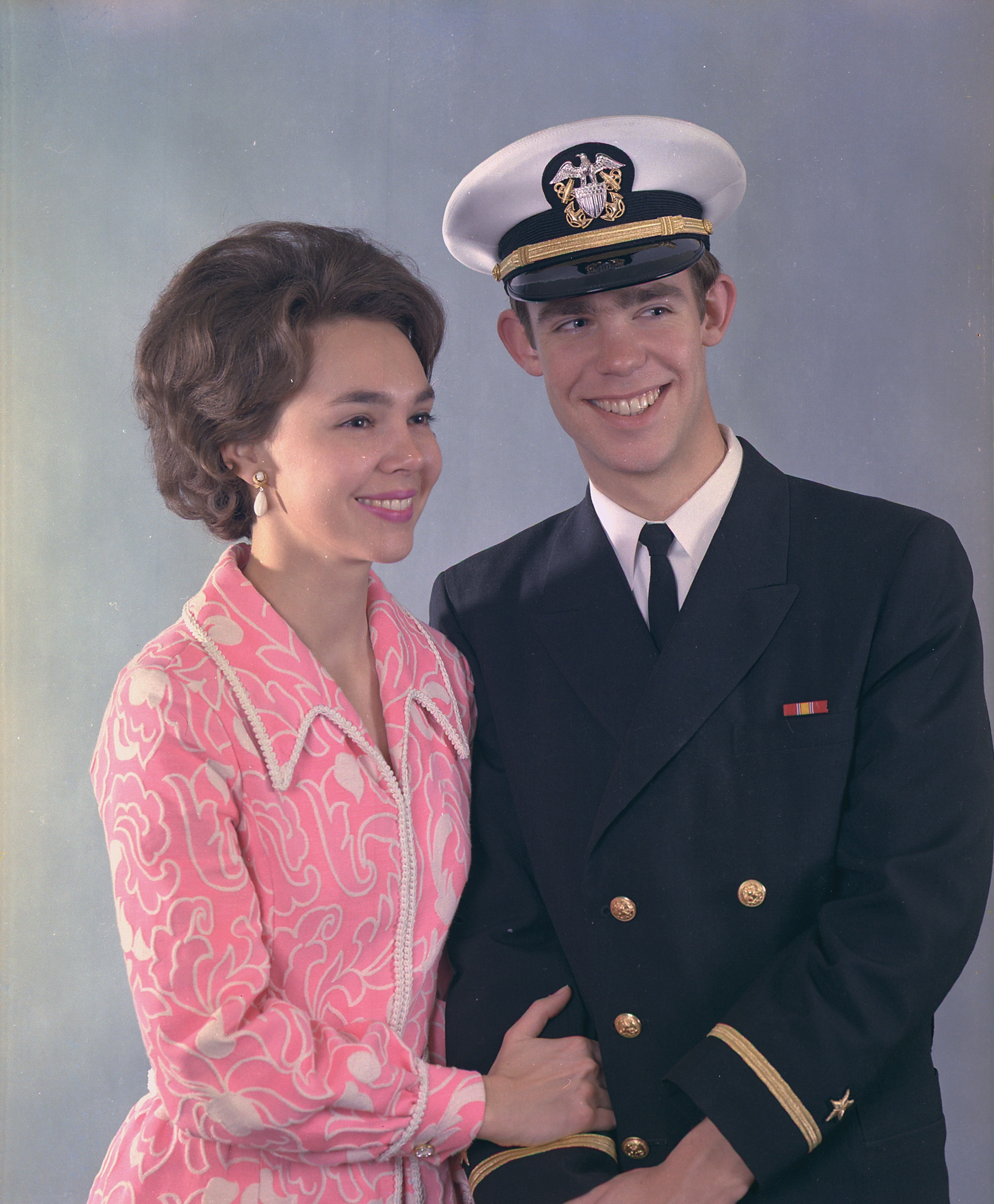
Julie and David Eisenhower (age 23) in 1971

On December 22, 1968, Eisenhower married Julie Nixon, a daughter of then President-elect Nixon, who had served as Dwight Eisenhower's vice president. The couple had known each other since meeting at the 1956 Republican National Convention. Eisenhower had served as Julie Nixon's civilian escort at the International Debutante Ball at the Waldorf-Astoria Hotel in New York City. The Reverend Norman Vincent Peale officiated in the non-denominational rite at the Marble Collegiate Church in New York City.

The Eisenhowers live in Berwyn, Pennsylvania. They have three children: actress Jennie Elizabeth Eisenhower (born August 15, 1978); Alexander Richard Eisenhower (b. 1980); and Melanie Catherine Eisenhower (b. 1984).

In 1970, Eisenhower accepted a request to attend the funeral of Dan Mitrione, an operative whose involvement in training Uruguayan police in torture techniques later caused profound controversy.

== In popular culture ==
Due to his connection with Julie and President Nixon, Eisenhower was one inspiration for the Creedence Clearwater Revival song "Fortunate Son", released in 1969. The song's author and singer, John Fogerty, wrote:

'Fortunate Son' wasn't really inspired by any one event. Julie Nixon was dating David Eisenhower. You'd hear about the son of this senator or that congressman who was given a deferment from the military or a choice position in the military. They seemed privileged and whether they liked it or not, these people were symbolic in the sense that they weren't being touched by what their parents were doing. They weren't being affected like the rest of us.

He was referenced in the Doonesbury comic strip in March 1976. When Uncle Duke, in his role as ambassador to China, was presented to Chairman Mao, Mao confused Duke with "his old friend David Eisenhower."
