= Tricia Nixon Cox =

Daughter of Richard Nixon (born 1946)

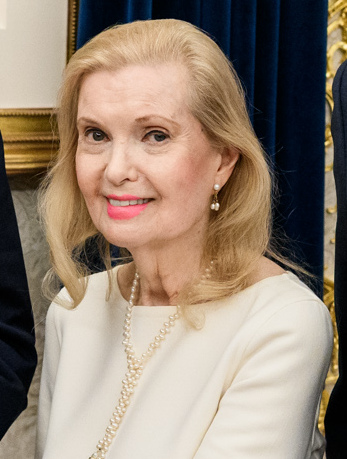
- Nixon Cox in 2025
- Born: Patricia Nixon; February 21, 1946 (age 80); Whittier, California, U.S.
- Other name: Sugarfoot (Secret Service codename)
- Education: Boston College (BA)
- Political party: Republican
- Spouse: Edward F. Cox (m. 1971)
- Children: Christopher Nixon Cox
- Parents: Richard Nixon; Pat Nixon

Patricia Nixon Cox (née Nixon; born February 21, 1946) is the elder daughter of the 37th president of the United States Richard Nixon and First Lady Pat Nixon, and the sister of Julie Nixon Eisenhower. She is married to Edward F. Cox and is the mother of Christopher Nixon Cox.

In her father's public career, Cox performed a ceremonial role, in contrast to Julie's more political involvement. She accompanied him on many campaign stops and, after his inauguration, on state trips around the world.

== Early life ==
Nixon was born on February 21, 1946, at Murphy Memorial Hospital in Whittier, California. She grew up in Washington, D.C., attending Horace Mann Elementary and the Sidwell Friends School. Later she attended the Chapin School in Manhattan.

In 1964, she was presented as a debutante to high society at the International Debutante Ball at the Waldorf-Astoria Hotel in New York City. Edward Cox was her civilian escort at the ball.

She attended the now-defunct women's college Finch College, graduating in 1968 with a Bachelor of Arts. At her graduation on June 14, 1968, her father served as a special guest speaker. In 1969, future president George W. Bush took Nixon on a date arranged by his father. After Bush spilled wine and tried to smoke a cigarette, Nixon requested to be taken back to the White House.

In 1969, she hosted a Halloween party for 250 children at the White House. Actor Jonathan Frid who played Barnabas Collins in the Dark Shadows show was in attendance.

== Personal life ==
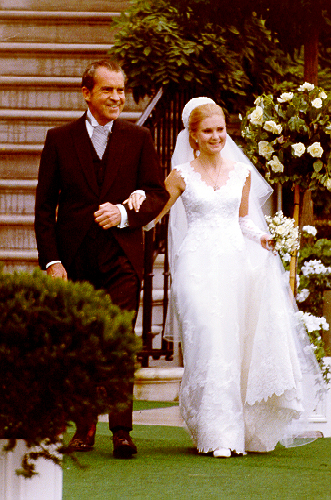
Tricia Nixon, escorted by her father down the aisle at her wedding to Edward Cox in 1971

Tricia Nixon married Harvard Law student Edward F. Cox in a White House Rose Garden ceremony on June 12, 1971.

In a 2015 interview with Max Foster for CNN regarding an upcoming visit to the United States, Charles, then Prince of Wales, recalled his first visit to the U.S. in 1970 as "the time when they were trying to marry me off to Tricia Nixon" who was nearly three years his senior and American. Nixon had represented the U.S. government along with former Vice President Hubert H. Humphrey at Charles' investiture in Caernarvon, Wales one year earlier in July 1969.

She has lived a very private life in the suburbs of New York, and was a stay-at-home mother to her son, Christopher Nixon Cox, born in March 1979. Her husband is now a corporate attorney and a chairman of the New York Republican State Committee. She serves on the boards of many medical research institutions, as well as the Richard Nixon Foundation at the Nixon Library in California.
